= 13th Parliament of Jamaica =

Members of the Jamaican Parliament (2016–2020)

The 13th Parliament of Jamaica was sworn in after being elected at the 2016 Jamaican general election.

== Members ==
Constituency	Member of Parliament	Party	Representative since
Hanover Eastern	Dave Brown	Jamaica Labour Party	2016
Hanover Western	Ian Hayles	People's National Party	2007
Saint Elizabeth North Eastern	Evon Redman	People's National Party	2016
Saint Elizabeth North Western	William J.C. Hutchinson	Jamaica Labour Party	1997
Saint Elizabeth South Eastern	Franklyn Witter	Jamaica Labour Party	2016
Saint Elizabeth South Western	Floyd Green	Jamaica Labour Party	2016
Saint James Central	Heroy Clarke	Jamaica Labour Party	2016
Saint James East Central	Edmund Bartlett	Jamaica Labour Party	2002
Saint James North Western	Horace Chang	Jamaica Labour Party	2002
Saint James Southern	Derrick Kellier	People's National Party	1989
Saint James West Central	Marlene Malahoo Forte	Jamaica Labour Party	2016
Trelawny Northern	Victor Wright	People's National Party	2016
Trelawny Southern	Marisa Dalrymple-Philibert	Jamaica Labour Party	2007
Westmoreland Central	Dwayne Vaz	People's National Party	2016
Westmoreland Eastern	Luther Buchanan	People's National Party	2006
Westmoreland Western	Wykeham McNeill	People's National Party	1997
Clarendon Central	Michael Henry	Jamaica Labour Party	1980
Clarendon Northern	Horace Dalley	People's National Party	1989
Clarendon North Central	Pearnel Charles	Jamaica Labour Party	2002
Clarendon North Western	Richard Azan	People's National Party	2011
Clarendon South Eastern	Pearnel Charles Jr	Jamaica Labour Party	2002
Clarendon South Western	Noel Arscott	People's National Party	2007
Manchester Central	Peter Bunting	People's National Party	2007
Manchester North Eastern	Audley Shaw	Jamaica Labour Party	1993
Manchester North Western	Mikael Phillips	People's National Party	2011
Manchester Southern	Michael Stewart	People's National Party	2016
Saint Ann North Eastern	Shahine Robinson	Jamaica Labour Party	2001
Saint Ann North Western	Dayton Campbell	People's National Party	2011
Saint Ann South Eastern	Lisa Hanna	People's National Party	2007
Saint Ann South Western	Zavia Mayne	Jamaica Labour Party	2016
Saint Catherine Central	Olivia Grange	Jamaica Labour Party	1997
Saint Catherine Eastern	Denise Daley	People's National Party	2011
Saint Catherine East Central	Alando Terrelonge	Jamaica Labour Party	2016
Saint Catherine North Central	Natalie Neita-Headley	People's National Party	2007
Saint Catherine North Eastern	Leslie Campbell	Jamaica Labour Party	2016
Saint Catherine North Western	Robert Pickersgill	People's National Party	1989
Saint Catherine Southern	Fitz Jackson	People's National Party	1997
Saint Catherine South Central	Andrew Wheatley	Jamaica Labour Party	2011
Saint Catherine South Eastern	Colin Fagan	People's National Party	2007
Saint Catherine South Western	Everald Warmington	Jamaica Labour Party	2002
Saint Catherine West Central	Christopher Tufton	Jamaica Labour Party	2016
Saint Mary Central	Morais Guy	People's National Party	2002
Saint Mary South Eastern	Winston Green	Jamaica Labour Party	2016
Saint Mary Western	Robert Montague	Jamaica Labour Party	2016
Kingston Central	Ronald Thwaites	People's National Party	1997
Kingston East & Port Royal	Phillip Paulwell	People's National Party	1997
Kingston Western	Desmond McKenzie	Jamaica Labour Party	2011
Portland Eastern	Lynvale Bloomfield	People's National Party	2011
Portland Western	Daryl Vaz	Jamaica Labour Party	2007
Saint Andrew Eastern	Fayval Williams	Jamaica Labour Party	2016
Saint Andrew East Central	Peter Phillips	People's National Party	1989
Saint Andrew East Rural	Juliet Holness	Jamaica Labour Party	2016
Saint Andrew North Central	Karl Samuda	Jamaica Labour Party	1989
Saint Andrew North Eastern	Delroy Chuck	Jamaica Labour Party	1997
Saint Andrew North Western	Derrick C. Smith	Jamaica Labour Party	2007
Saint Andrew Southern	Omar Davies	People's National Party	2007
Saint Andrew South Eastern	Julian Robinson	People's National Party	2011
Saint Andrew South Western	Portia Simpson-Miller	People's National Party	1989
Saint Andrew Western	Anthony Hylton	People's National Party	2007
Saint Andrew West Central	Andrew Holness	Jamaica Labour Party	1997
Saint Andrew West Rural	Juliet Cuthbert-Flynn	Jamaica Labour Party	2016
Saint Thomas Eastern	Fenton Ferguson	People's National Party	1993
Saint Thomas Western	James Robertson	Jamaica Labour Party	2002
