= 2025 Jamaican general election =

- 3 September 2025

All 63 seats in the House of Representatives 32 seats needed for a majority
- Registered: 2,077,800
- Turnout: 39.96% (▲2.11pp)
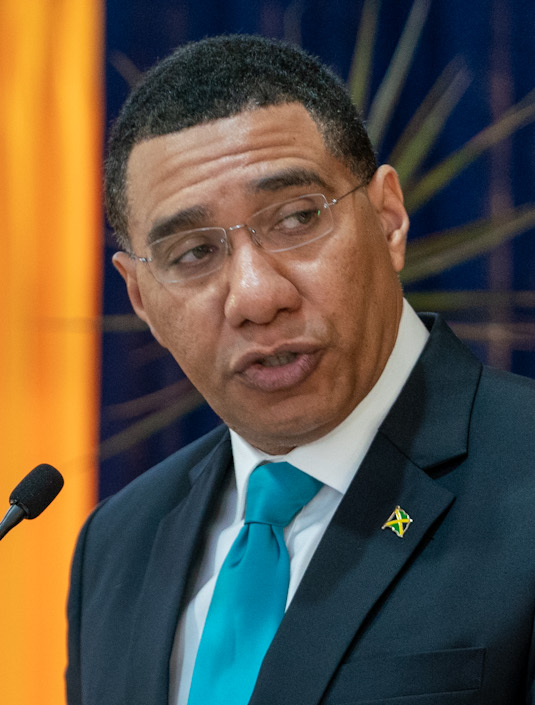

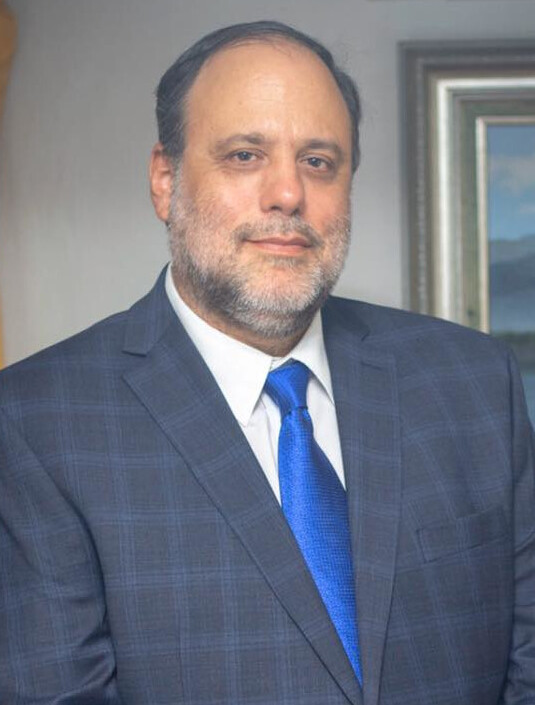
	First party	Second party
Leader	Andrew Holness	Mark Golding
Party	JLP	PNP
Last election	57.07%, 49 seats	42.76%, 14 seats
Seats after	35	28
Seat change	▼14	▲14
Popular vote	412,705	401,398
Percentage	50.54%	49.16%
Swing	▼6.53pp	▲6.40pp
Prime Minister before election
Andrew Holness
JLP
Prime Minister after election
Andrew Holness
JLP

General elections were held in Jamaica on 3 September 2025. The incumbent Jamaica Labour Party (JLP) government, led by Prime Minister Andrew Holness, won a third term in office against the opposition People's National Party (PNP). However, the JLP lost 14 seats to the PNP, still retaining a majority.

== Background ==
Minister of Legal and Constitutional Affairs Marlene Malahoo Forte said that Jamaica would transition to being a republic before the next general election. In December 2024 a bill was tabled on transitioning to becoming a republic. The bill required review by joint committees, followed by a parliamentary vote and a referendum to approve the change. It was announced in March 2025 that a referendum would not occur before the general election.

Preselection contests were held in March 2025.

=== Timeline ===
- 21 September 2023 – Speaker Marisa Dalrymple-Philibert resigns as MP for Trelawny Southern.
- 26 February 2024 – local elections were held.
- 9 March 2025 – The Jamaica Patriotic Movement announced support for the People's National Party.
- 10 August 2025 – Prime Minister Holness announces nomination day to be on 18 August and elections to follow on 3 September 2025.
- 29 August 2025 – Advanced voting was held for members of the security forces and poll workers, with 57% turnout recorded.

== Electoral system ==
The 63 members of the House of Representatives are elected in single-member constituencies by first-past-the-post voting. Voters must be 18 years or over and be a citizen of Jamaica or a Commonwealth citizen who is resident in Jamaica at the date of registration and has been a resident for at least twelve months prior to the date of registration.

The leader of the party commanding a majority of support in the House of Representatives is called on by the Governor General to form a government as Prime Minister, while the leader of the largest group or coalition not in government becomes the Leader of the Opposition.

== Members not seeking re-election ==
Member	Constituency	Party	First elected	Date announced
Lisa Hanna	Saint Ann South Eastern	People's National Party	2007	9 August 2022
Phillip Henriques	Clarendon North Western	Jamaica Labour Party	2020	23 January 2025
Peter Phillips	Saint Andrew East Central	People's National Party	1993	
William J.C. Hutchinson	Saint Elizabeth North Western	Jamaica Labour Party	1997	
Morais Guy	Saint Mary Central	People's National Party	2002	

== Campaign ==
Prime Minister Andrew Holness announced the date of the election at a JLP party meeting held on 10 August 2025 at Half Way Tree.

The election was decided in marginal seats. Among the JLP's campaign pledges was the doubling of the current minimum wage of J$16,000 to J$32,000 per 40-hour workweek, while the PNP included increasing the income tax threshold from J$1.5 million to J$3.5 million as part of its promises.

== Parties ==
Parties contesting the general election
Party	Abr.
People's National Party	PNP
Jamaica Labour Party	JLP
Jamaica Progressive Party	JPP
United Independents' Congress of Jamaica	UIC

== Candidates ==
There are 189 candidates, including nine independents.

Constituency	JLP	PNP
Clarendon Central	Delroy Williams	Carla Watt
Clarendon North Central	Robert Nesta Morgan	Aujae Dixon
Clarendon North Western	Warren Newby	Richard Azan
Clarendon Northern	Dwight Sibblies	Wavell Hinds
Clarendon South Eastern	Pearnel Charles	Scean Barnswell
Clarendon South Western	Robert Chin	Lothan Cousins
Hanover Eastern	Dave Hume-Brown	Andrea Purkiss
Hanover Western	Tamika Davis	Heatha Miller-Bennett
Kingston Central	Donovan Williams	Steve McGreggor
Kingston East & Port Royal	Egwugwu Priestly	Phillip Paulwell
Kingston Western	Desmond McKenzie CD	Joseph Witter
Manchester Central	Rhoda Moy Crawford	Donovan Mitchell
Manchester North Eastern	Audrey Marks	Valenton Wint
Manchester North Western	Damion Young	Mikael Phillips
Manchester Southern	Ian Ives	Peter Bunting
Portland Eastern	Ann-Marie Vaz	Isat Buchanan
Portland Western	Daryl Vaz	Doreen Forbes Campbell
Saint Andrew East Central	Davion Vassell	Dennis Gordon
Saint Andrew East Rural	Juliet Holness	Patrick Peterkin
Saint Andrew Eastern	Fayval Williams	Patricia Duncan-Sutherland
Saint Andrew North Central	Delano Seiveright	Christopher Henry
Saint Andrew North Eastern	Delroy Chuck	Stacey Knight
Saint Andrew North Western	Duane Smith	Ethnie Miller-Simpson
Saint Andrew South Eastern	Kevin Frith	Julian Robinson
Saint Andrew South Western	Maureen Lorne	Angela Brown-Burke
Saint Andrew Southern	Carlton Allen	Mark Golding
Saint Andrew West Central	Andrew Holness	Paul Buchanan
Saint Andrew West Rural	Juliet Cuthbert-Flynn	Joan Gordon-Webley
Saint Andrew Western	Corey Dunkley	Anthony Hylton
Saint Ann North Eastern	Matthew Samuda	Ryan Simpson
Saint Ann North Western	Krystal Lee	Gabriela Morris
Saint Ann South Eastern	Adion Peart	Kenneth Russell
Saint Ann South Western	Zavia Mayne	Danhea Williams
Saint Catherine Central	Olivia Grange	Pheobe Lewis
Saint Catherine East Central	Alando Terrelonge	Raymond Pryce
Saint Catherine Eastern	Rev. Dwight Peccoo	Denise Daley
Saint Catherine North Central	Neil Powell	Natalie Neita
Saint Catherine North Eastern	Kerensia Morrison	Ava Higgins
Saint Catherine North Western	Newton Amos	Damion Crawford
Saint Catherine South Central	Andrew Wheatley	Kurt Matthews
Saint Catherine South Eastern	Robert Miller	Alfred Dawes
Saint Catherine South Western	Everald Warmington	Kurt Waul
Saint Catherine Southern	Delroy Dobney	Fitz Jackson
Saint Catherine West Central	Dr. Christopher Tufton	Vivian Francis
Saint Elizabeth North Eastern	Delroy Slowley	Zuleika Jess
Saint Elizabeth North Western	Andrew Morris	Jason Edwards
Saint Elizabeth South Eastern	Franklyn Witter	Newton Scott
Saint Elizabeth South Western	Floyd Green	Melissa Wellington
Saint James Central	Heroy Clarke	Janice Allen
Saint James East Central	Edmund Bartlett	Claudine Reid-Knott
Saint James North Western	Horace Chang	Allen Bernard
Saint James Southern	Homer Davis	Nekeisha Burchell
Saint James West Central	Marlene Malahoo Forte	Andre Haughton
Saint Mary Central	Nathaniel Maragh	Omar Newell
Saint Mary South Eastern	Norman Dunn	Christopher Brown
Saint Mary Western	Robert Montague	Omar Woodbine
Saint Thomas Eastern	Dr. Michelle Charles	Yvonne Shaw
Saint Thomas Western	James Robertson	Hubert Williams
Trelawny Northern	Tova Hamilton	Dennis Meadows
Trelawny Southern	Devon McDaniel	Paul Patmore
Westmoreland Central	George Wright	Dwayne Vaz
Westmoreland Eastern	Daniel Lawrence	Dayton Campbell
Westmoreland Western	Garfield James	Ian Hayles

== Opinion polls ==
Date	Pollster	Sample size	JLP	PNP	Other (Note: Includes "Don't Know/Unsure")	Non-voting	Lead
3 September 2025	2025 general election	–	50.54	49.16	0.30	–	1.38
31 August 2025	Bluedot	1,511	46	33	–	–	13
22 – 26 August 2025	Don Anderson	1,010	34.5	37.6	27.9		3.1
2 – 11 August 2025	Don Anderson	1,008	33.9	34.7	14.3	17.1	0.8
18 May – 7 June 2025	Don Anderson	1,033	29.6	32.6	18.4	19.4	3.0
2 – 17 May 2025	Bluedot	1,618	35	31	34	–	4.0
27 September – 3 October 2024	RJR Gleaner Group/Don Anderson poll	1,012	43.5	56.5	–	–	13
6 – 19 September 2024	Nationwide/Bluedot poll	1,246	53	47	–	–	6
June 2024	RJR Gleaner Group/Don Anderson poll	–	44.0	56	–	–	12
4 – 12 April 2024	RJR Gleaner Group/Don Anderson poll	1,057	44.1	55.9	–	–	11.8
26 February 2024	2024 Jamaican local elections	–	47.8	51.8	0.6	–	4
24 November – 7 December 2023	RJR Gleaner Group/Don Anderson poll	1,015	22	25	18	35	3
17 – 26 February 2023	RJR Gleaner Group/Don Anderson poll	1,002	27.9	28.1	19	25	0.2
13 September 2022	RJR Gleaner Group/Don Anderson poll	–	31	18	17	34	13
22 September 2021	RJR Gleaner Group/Don Anderson poll	1,003	26	15	26	31	11
3 September 2020	2020 general election	–	57.1	42.8	0.1	–	14.3

== Results ==
Most voted party by constituency: Jamaica Labour Party People's National Party

Prime Minister Andrew Holness was elected to a third term after his JLP won 35 of 63 seats in Parliament, followed by the PNP with 28 seats. Holness was congratulated by foreign leaders, including Indian Prime Minister Narendra Modi and U.S. Secretary of State Marco Rubio, on his party's victory. The JLP lost 14 seats to the PNP, with Minister of State in the Ministry of Local Government and Rural Development Homer Davis being defeated, among others.

Party	Votes	%	Seats	+/–
Jamaica Labour Party	412,705	50.54	35	–14
People's National Party	401,398	49.16	28	+14
Jamaica Progressive Party	2,040	0.25	0	New
United Independents' Congress of Jamaica	181	0.02	0	New
Independents	269	0.03	0	0
Total	816,593	100.00	63	0
Valid votes	816,593	98.35		
Invalid/blank votes	13,705	1.65		
Total votes	830,298	100.00		
Registered voters/turnout	2,077,800	39.96		
Source: Electoral Commission of Jamaica

=== By constituency ===
The results by constituency:

Constituency	Electorate	Turnout	%	Candidate	Party	Votes	%	Result
Clarendon Central	34,092	10,607	31.11%	Delroy Williams	JLP	6,674	62.92%	JLP hold
Clarendon Central	34,092	10,607	31.11%	Carla Watt	PNP	3,853	36.33%	JLP hold
Clarendon Central	34,092	10,607	31.11%	Bettina Hill	JPP	80	0.75%	JLP hold
Clarendon North Central	25,929	10,330	39.83%	Robert Nesta Morgan	JLP	5,877	56.89%	JLP hold
Clarendon North Central	25,929	10,330	39.83%	Aujae Dixon	PNP	4,424	42.83%	JLP hold
Clarendon North Central	25,929	10,330	39.83%	Joy Johnson-Roye	JPP	29	0.28%	JLP hold
Clarendon North Western	29,526	13,503	45.73%	Richard Azan	PNP	6,989	51.76%	PNP gain from JLP
Clarendon North Western	29,526	13,503	45.73%	Warren Newby	JLP	6,490	48.06%	PNP gain from JLP
Clarendon North Western	29,526	13,503	45.73%	Kevin Palmer	JPP	24	0.18%	PNP gain from JLP
Clarendon Northern	26,084	11,798	45.23%	Wavell Hinds	PNP	5,921	50.19%	PNP gain from JLP
Clarendon Northern	26,084	11,798	45.23%	Dwight Sibblies	JLP	5,853	49.61%	PNP gain from JLP
Clarendon Northern	26,084	11,798	45.23%	Judilyn Casey-Edwards	JPP	24	0.20%	PNP gain from JLP
Clarendon South Eastern	47,705	17,585	36.86%	Pearnel Charles	JLP	9,515	54.11%	JLP hold
Clarendon South Eastern	47,705	17,585	36.86%	Scean Barnswell	PNP	8,013	45.57%	JLP hold
Clarendon South Eastern	47,705	17,585	36.86%	Sion Thomas	JPP	57	0.32%	JLP hold
Clarendon South Western	31,024	12,385	39.92%	Lothan Cousins	PNP	7,328	59.17%	PNP hold
Clarendon South Western	31,024	12,385	39.92%	Robert Chin	JLP	5,016	40.50%	PNP hold
Clarendon South Western	31,024	12,385	39.92%	Dewayne Thomas	JPP	41	0.33%	PNP hold
Hanover Eastern	27,069	11,086	40.95%	Andrea Purkiss	PNP	5,905	53.27%	PNP gain from JLP
Hanover Eastern	27,069	11,086	40.95%	Dave Hume-Brown	JLP	5,138	46.35%	PNP gain from JLP
Hanover Eastern	27,069	11,086	40.95%	Craig Eubanks	JPP	28	0.25%	PNP gain from JLP
Hanover Eastern	27,069	11,086	40.95%	Jordan Cunningham	UIC	15	0.14%	PNP gain from JLP
Hanover Western	35,397	12,956	36.60%	Heatha Miller-Bennett	PNP	6,995	53.99%	PNP gain from JLP
Hanover Western	35,397	12,956	36.60%	Tamika Davis	JLP	5,907	45.59%	PNP gain from JLP
Hanover Western	35,397	12,956	36.60%	Leonard Sharpe	JPP	54	0.42%	PNP gain from JLP
Kingston Central	23,455	9,489	40.46%	Steve McGreggor	PNP	4,739	49.94%	PNP gain from JLP
Kingston Central	23,455	9,489	40.46%	Donovan Williams	JLP	4,727	49.82%	PNP gain from JLP
Kingston Central	23,455	9,489	40.46%	Garth Barnett	UIC	23	0.24%	PNP gain from JLP
Kingston East and Port Royal	27,630	7,831	28.83%	Phillip Paulwell	PNP	6,255	79.87%	PNP hold
Kingston East and Port Royal	27,630	7,831	28.83%	Courtney Burnett	JLP	1,472	18.80%	PNP hold
Kingston East and Port Royal	27,630	7,831	28.83%	George Williams	JPP	104	1.33%	PNP hold
Kingston Western	25,078	9,873	39.37%	Desmond McKenzie	JLP	8,475	85.84%	JLP hold
Kingston Western	25,078	9,873	39.37%	Joseph Witter	PNP	1,364	13.82%	JLP hold
Kingston Western	25,078	9,873	39.37%	Ricardo Williams	JPP	34	0.34%	JLP hold
Manchester Central	43,054	18,014	41.84%	Rhoda Moy Crawford	JLP	9,098	50.51%	JLP hold
Manchester Central	43,054	18,014	41.84%	Donovan Mitchell	PNP	8,916	49.49%	JLP hold
Manchester North Eastern	32,055	14,446	45.07%	Audrey Marks	JLP	8,139	56.34%	JLP hold
Manchester North Eastern	32,055	14,446	45.07%	Valenton Wint	PNP	6,274	43.43%	JLP hold
Manchester North Eastern	32,055	14,446	45.07%	Clive Warren	JPP	33	0.23%	JLP hold
Manchester North Western	30,825	12,943	41.99%	Mikael Phillips	PNP	7,025	54.28%	PNP hold
Manchester North Western	30,825	12,943	41.99%	Damion Young	JLP	5,880	45.43%	PNP hold
Manchester North Western	30,825	12,943	41.99%	Tretia Stewart-Angus	JPP	38	0.29%	PNP hold
Manchester Southern	36,450	16,497	45.26%	Peter Bunting	PNP	8,573	51.97%	PNP hold
Manchester Southern	36,450	16,497	45.26%	Ian Ives	JLP	7,903	47.91%	PNP hold
Manchester Southern	36,450	16,497	45.26%	Karen Scott	JPP	21	0.13%	PNP hold
Portland Eastern	40,714	16,526	40.59%	Isat Buchanan	PNP	8,316	50.32%	PNP gain from JLP
Portland Eastern	40,714	16,526	40.59%	Ann-Marie Vaz	JLP	8,181	49.50%	PNP gain from JLP
Portland Eastern	40,714	16,526	40.59%	Tracy-Ann Gillespie-Harris	JPP	29	0.18%	PNP gain from JLP
Portland Western	25,171	11,071	43.98%	Daryl Vaz	JLP	6,111	55.20%	JLP hold
Portland Western	25,171	11,071	43.98%	Doreen Forbes Campbell	PNP	4,937	44.59%	JLP hold
Portland Western	25,171	11,071	43.98%	Michael Aiken	JPP	23	0.21%	JLP hold
Saint Andrew East Central	33,047	10,967	33.19%	Dennis Gordon	PNP	6,709	61.17%	PNP hold
Saint Andrew East Central	33,047	10,967	33.19%	Davion Vassell	JLP	4,171	38.03%	PNP hold
Saint Andrew East Central	33,047	10,967	33.19%	Princess Ford	JPP	87	0.79%	PNP hold
Saint Andrew East Rural	43,636	17,959	41.16%	Juliet Holness	JLP	9,364	52.14%	JLP hold
Saint Andrew East Rural	43,636	17,959	41.16%	Patrick Peterkin	PNP	8,498	47.32%	JLP hold
Saint Andrew East Rural	43,636	17,959	41.16%	Kemesha Hendricks	UIC	50	0.28%	JLP hold
Saint Andrew East Rural	43,636	17,959	41.16%	Purcell Jackson	JPP	47	0.26%	JLP hold
Saint Andrew Eastern	29,980	13,283	44.31%	Fayval Williams	JLP	6,824	51.37%	JLP hold
Saint Andrew Eastern	29,980	13,283	44.31%	Patricia Duncan-Sutherland	PNP	6,386	48.08%	JLP hold
Saint Andrew Eastern	29,980	13,283	44.31%	Carl Cargill	JPP	73	0.55%	JLP hold
Saint Andrew North Central	23,957	9,086	37.93%	Delano Seiveright	JLP	5,769	63.49%	JLP hold
Saint Andrew North Central	23,957	9,086	37.93%	Christopher Henry	PNP	3,317	36.51%	JLP hold
Saint Andrew North Eastern	22,358	9,001	40.26%	Delroy Chuck	JLP	5,294	58.82%	JLP hold
Saint Andrew North Eastern	22,358	9,001	40.26%	Stacey Knight	PNP	3,707	41.18%	JLP hold
Saint Andrew North Western	32,935	11,103	33.71%	Duane Smith	JLP	6,546	58.96%	JLP hold
Saint Andrew North Western	32,935	11,103	33.71%	Ethnie Miller-Simpson	PNP	4,443	40.02%	JLP hold
Saint Andrew North Western	32,935	11,103	33.71%	Orlando Robinson	JPP	114	1.03%	JLP hold
Saint Andrew South Eastern	23,161	8,589	37.08%	Julian Robinson	PNP	5,418	63.08%	PNP hold
Saint Andrew South Eastern	23,161	8,589	37.08%	Kevin Frith	JLP	3,137	36.52%	PNP hold
Saint Andrew South Eastern	23,161	8,589	37.08%	Kemoy Lynch	UIC	34	0.40%	PNP hold
Saint Andrew South Western	27,489	9,191	33.44%	Angela Brown-Burke	PNP	8,575	93.30%	PNP hold
Saint Andrew South Western	27,489	9,191	33.44%	Maureen Lorne	JLP	583	6.34%	PNP hold
Saint Andrew South Western	27,489	9,191	33.44%	Jahmar Watson	UIC	17	0.18%	PNP hold
Saint Andrew South Western	27,489	9,191	33.44%	Antonio Wint	JPP	16	0.17%	PNP hold
Saint Andrew Southern	26,452	10,554	39.90%	Mark Golding	PNP	9371	88.79%	PNP hold
Saint Andrew Southern	26,452	10,554	39.90%	Carlton Allen	JLP	1183	11.21%	PNP hold
Saint Andrew West Central	32,715	12,007	36.70%	Andrew Holness	JLP	7,054	58.75%	JLP hold
Saint Andrew West Central	32,715	12,007	36.70%	Paul Buchanan	PNP	4,953	41.25%	JLP hold
Saint Andrew West Rural	42,819	15,718	36.71%	Juliet Cuthbert-Flynn	JLP	8,414	53.53%	JLP hold
Saint Andrew West Rural	42,819	15,718	36.71%	Joan Gordon-Webley	PNP	7,235	46.03%	JLP hold
Saint Andrew West Rural	42,819	15,718	36.71%	George Roach	JPP	69	0.44%	JLP hold
Saint Andrew Western	39,800	12,642	31.76%	Anthony Hylton	PNP	8,115	64.19%	PNP hold
Saint Andrew Western	39,800	12,642	31.76%	Corey Dunkley	JLP	4,443	35.14%	PNP hold
Saint Andrew Western	39,800	12,642	31.76%	Carla Francis-Edie	JPP	84	0.66%	PNP hold
Saint Ann North Eastern	45,328	16,327	36.02%	Matthew Samuda	JLP	9,528	58.36%	JLP hold
Saint Ann North Eastern	45,328	16,327	36.02%	Ryan Simpson	PNP	6,799	41.64%	JLP hold
Saint Ann North Western	41,989	15,538	37.00%	Krystal Lee	JLP	8,050	51.81%	JLP hold
Saint Ann North Western	41,989	15,538	37.00%	Gabriela Morris	PNP	7,488	48.19%	JLP hold
Saint Ann South Eastern	33,692	12,216	36.26%	Kenneth Russell	PNP	7,492	61.33%	PNP hold
Saint Ann South Eastern	33,692	12,216	36.26%	Adion Peart	JLP	4,724	38.67%	PNP hold
Saint Ann South Western	29,179	12,292	42.13%	Zavia Mayne	JLP	7,218	58.72%	JLP hold
Saint Ann South Western	29,179	12,292	42.13%	Danhea Williams	PNP	5,039	40.99%	JLP hold
Saint Ann South Western	29,179	12,292	42.13%	Clive Edwards	JPP	35	0.28%	JLP hold
Saint Catherine Central	34,198	11,234	32.85%	Olivia Grange	JLP	9,217	82.05%	JLP hold
Saint Catherine Central	34,198	11,234	32.85%	Pheobe Ramoni Lewis	PNP	2,017	17.95%	JLP hold
Saint Catherine East Central	31,808	11,743	36.92%	Alando Terrelonge	JLP	6,364	54.19%	JLP hold
Saint Catherine East Central	31,808	11,743	36.92%	Raymond Pryce	PNP	5,379	45.81%	JLP hold
Saint Catherine Eastern	35,473	11,246	31.70%	Denise Daley	PNP	6,758	60.09%	PNP hold
Saint Catherine Eastern	35,473	11,246	31.70%	Dwight Peccoo	JLP	4,413	39.24%	PNP hold
Saint Catherine Eastern	35,473	11,246	31.70%	Lance Watson	JPP	75	0.67%	PNP hold
Saint Catherine North Central	34,406	11,370	33.05%	Natalie Neita	PNP	7,098	62.43%	PNP hold
Saint Catherine North Central	34,406	11,370	33.05%	Neil Powell	JLP	4,229	37.19%	PNP hold
Saint Catherine North Central	34,406	11,370	33.05%	Carlton Bartley	JPP	43	0.38%	PNP hold
Saint Catherine North Eastern	25,756	10,190	39.56%	Kerensia Morrison	JLP	5,554	54.50%	JLP hold
Saint Catherine North Eastern	25,756	10,190	39.56%	Andrine (Ava) Higgins	PNP	4,598	45.12%	JLP hold
Saint Catherine North Eastern	25,756	10,190	39.56%	Robert Rainford	JPP	20	0.20%	JLP hold
Saint Catherine North Eastern	25,756	10,190	39.56%	Arthur Howell	Ind	18	0.18%	JLP hold
Saint Catherine North Western	38,246	12,456	32.57%	Damion Crawford	PNP	7,580	60.85%	PNP hold
Saint Catherine North Western	38,246	12,456	32.57%	Newton Amos	JLP	4,855	38.98%	PNP hold
Saint Catherine North Western	38,246	12,456	32.57%	Lloyd Smith	JPP	21	0.17%	PNP hold
Saint Catherine South Central	31,656	10,607	33.51%	Andrew Wheatley	JLP	7,630	71.93%	JLP hold
Saint Catherine South Central	31,656	10,607	33.51%	Kurt Matthews	PNP	2,905	27.39%	JLP hold
Saint Catherine South Central	31,656	10,607	33.51%	Lincoln Hall	JPP	72	0.68%	JLP hold
Saint Catherine South Eastern	42,124	15,005	35.62%	Alfred Dawes	PNP	7,754	51.68%	PNP gain from JLP
Saint Catherine South Eastern	42,124	15,005	35.62%	Robert Miller	JLP	7,187	47.90%	PNP gain from JLP
Saint Catherine South Eastern	42,124	15,005	35.62%	Kaycian Radcliffe	JPP	64	0.43%	PNP gain from JLP
Saint Catherine South Western	45,006	19,192	42.64%	Everald Warmington	JLP	10,607	55.27%	JLP hold
Saint Catherine South Western	45,006	19,192	42.64%	Kurt Waul	PNP	8,488	44.23%	JLP hold
Saint Catherine South Western	45,006	19,192	42.64%	Gilbert Edwards	JPP	97	0.51%	JLP hold
Saint Catherine Southern	44,884	15,126	33.70%	Fitz Jackson	PNP	9,025	59.67%	PNP hold
Saint Catherine Southern	44,884	15,126	33.70%	Delroy Dobney	JLP	5,970	39.47%	PNP hold
Saint Catherine Southern	44,884	15,126	33.70%	Courtney Morrison	JPP	131	0.87%	PNP hold
Saint Catherine West Central	33,412	10,734	32.13%	Christopher Tufton	JLP	6,940	64.65%	JLP hold
Saint Catherine West Central	33,412	10,734	32.13%	Vivian Francis	PNP	3,718	34.64%	JLP hold
Saint Catherine West Central	33,412	10,734	32.13%	Colleen Ellison-Hall	JPP	76	0.71%	JLP hold
Saint Elizabeth North Eastern	38,006	16,097	42.35%	Zuleika Jess	PNP	8,331	51.75%	PNP gain from JLP
Saint Elizabeth North Eastern	38,006	16,097	42.35%	Delroy Slowley	JLP	7,735	48.05%	PNP gain from JLP
Saint Elizabeth North Eastern	38,006	16,097	42.35%	Shawn Myrie	JPP	20	0.12%	PNP gain from JLP
Saint Elizabeth North Eastern	38,006	16,097	42.35%	Joseph Patterson	UIC	11	0.07%	PNP gain from JLP
Saint Elizabeth North Western	23,824	9,425	39.56%	Andrew Morris	JLP	5,555	58.94%	JLP hold
Saint Elizabeth North Western	23,824	9,425	39.56%	Patricia Scarlett-Forrester	PNP	3,831	40.65%	JLP hold
Saint Elizabeth North Western	23,824	9,425	39.56%	Jason Edwards	JPP	39	0.41%	JLP hold
Saint Elizabeth South Eastern	33,729	16,934	50.21%	Franklyn Witter	JLP	9,318	55.03%	JLP hold
Saint Elizabeth South Eastern	33,729	16,934	50.21%	Norman Scott	PNP	7,569	44.70%	JLP hold
Saint Elizabeth South Eastern	33,729	16,934	50.21%	Raymond Dobbs	JPP	47	0.28%	JLP hold
Saint Elizabeth South Western	35,101	18,167	51.76%	Floyd Green	JLP	9,705	53.42%	JLP hold
Saint Elizabeth South Western	35,101	18,167	51.76%	Melissa Wellington	PNP	8,462	46.58%	JLP hold
Saint James Central	32,957	11,222	34.05%	Heroy Clarke	JLP	6,567	58.52%	JLP hold
Saint James Central	32,957	11,222	34.05%	Janice Allen	PNP	4,655	41.48%	JLP hold
Saint James East Central	34,871	12,012	34.45%	Edmund Bartlett	JLP	7,469	62.18%	JLP hold
Saint James East Central	34,871	12,012	34.45%	Claudine Reid-Knott	PNP	4,543	37.82%	JLP hold
Saint James North Western	31,448	9,826	31.25%	Horace Chang	JLP	6,312	64.24%	JLP hold
Saint James North Western	31,448	9,826	31.25%	Allen Bernard	PNP	3,514	35.76%	JLP hold
Saint James Southern	30,432	12,776	41.98%	Nekeisha Burchell	PNP	6,483	50.74%	PNP gain from JLP
Saint James Southern	30,432	12,776	41.98%	Homer Davis	JLP	6,276	49.12%	PNP gain from JLP
Saint James Southern	30,432	12,776	41.98%	Leon Cunningham	JPP	17	0.13%	PNP gain from JLP
Saint James West Central	32,014	11,576	36.16%	Marlene Malahoo Forte	JLP	6,155	53.17%	JLP hold
Saint James West Central	32,014	11,576	36.16%	Andre Haughton	PNP	5,404	46.68%	JLP hold
Saint James West Central	32,014	11,576	36.16%	Clifford Barnett	Ind	17	0.15%	JLP hold
Saint Mary Central	29,718	12,963	43.62%	Omar Newell	PNP	7,191	55.47%	PNP hold
Saint Mary Central	29,718	12,963	43.62%	Nathaniel Maragh	JLP	5,760	44.43%	PNP hold
Saint Mary Central	29,718	12,963	43.62%	Rena Rose-Cargill	JPP	12	0.09%	PNP hold
Saint Mary South Eastern	27,310	13,299	48.70%	Christopher Brown	PNP	6,642	49.94%	PNP gain from JLP
Saint Mary South Eastern	27,310	13,299	48.70%	Norman Dunn	JLP	6,631	49.86%	PNP gain from JLP
Saint Mary South Eastern	27,310	13,299	48.70%	Mark Hutchinson	JPP	26	0.20%	PNP gain from JLP
Saint Mary Western	41,473	17,880	43.11%	Robert Montague	JLP	9,394	52.54%	JLP hold
Saint Mary Western	41,473	17,880	43.11%	Omar Woodbine	PNP	8,451	47.27%	JLP hold
Saint Mary Western	41,473	17,880	43.11%	Chase Neil	UIC	35	0.20%	JLP hold
Saint Thomas Eastern	34,739	14,370	41.37%	Yvonne Shaw	PNP	7,356	51.19%	PNP gain from JLP
Saint Thomas Eastern	34,739	14,370	41.37%	Michelle Charles	JLP	6,937	48.27%	PNP gain from JLP
Saint Thomas Eastern	34,739	14,370	41.37%	Claudius Wong	Ind	46	0.32%	PNP gain from JLP
Saint Thomas Eastern	34,739	14,370	41.37%	Jovian Blair	JPP	31	0.22%	PNP gain from JLP
Saint Thomas Western	44,345	17,034	38.41%	James Robertson	JLP	9,252	54.31%	JLP hold
Saint Thomas Western	44,345	17,034	38.41%	Hubert Williams	PNP	7,724	45.34%	JLP hold
Saint Thomas Western	44,345	17,034	38.41%	Karlene Afflick	JPP	58	0.34%	JLP hold
Trelawny Northern	39,152	15,979	40.81%	Tova Hamilton	JLP	8,159	51.06%	JLP hold
Trelawny Northern	39,152	15,979	40.81%	Dennis Meadows	PNP	7,820	48.94%	JLP hold
Trelawny Southern	25,976	12,047	46.38%	Devon McDaniel	JLP	6,832	56.71%	JLP hold
Trelawny Southern	25,976	12,047	46.38%	Paul Patmore	PNP	5,215	43.29%	JLP hold
Westmoreland Central	49,190	18,378	33.36%	Dwayne Vaz	PNP	9,916	53.96%	PNP gain from JLP
Westmoreland Central	49,190	18,378	33.36%	George Wright	JLP	8,385	45.63%	PNP gain from JLP
Westmoreland Central	49,190	18,378	33.36%	Kathleen Greenwood	JPP	39	0.21%	PNP gain from JLP
Westmoreland Central	49,190	18,378	33.36%	Donn Foote	Ind	38	0.21%	PNP gain from JLP
Westmoreland Eastern	31,978	13,335	41.70%	Dayton Campbell	PNP	7,558	56.68%	PNP gain from JLP
Westmoreland Eastern	31,978	13,335	41.70%	Daniel Lawrence	JLP	5,624	42.17%	PNP gain from JLP
Westmoreland Eastern	31,978	13,335	41.70%	Dalton Allen	JPP	73	0.55%	PNP gain from JLP
Westmoreland Eastern	31,978	13,335	41.70%	Haile Cujo	Ind	53	0.40%	PNP gain from JLP
Westmoreland Eastern	31,978	13,335	41.70%	Winston Wright	UIC	16	0.12%	PNP gain from JLP
Westmoreland Eastern	31,978	13,335	41.70%	Derrick Robinson	Ind	11	0.08%	PNP gain from JLP
Westmoreland Western	40,824	14,113	34.57%	Ian Hayles	PNP	7,992	56.63%	PNP gain from JLP
Westmoreland Western	40,824	14,113	34.57%	Garfield James	JLP	6,024	42.68%	PNP gain from JLP
Westmoreland Western	40,824	14,113	34.57%	Gilbert James	Ind	71	0.50%	PNP gain from JLP
Westmoreland Western	40,824	14,113	34.57%	Bertland Maddan	JPP	26	0.18%	PNP gain from JLP
Source: Electoral Commission of Jamaica
