= 2020 Jamaican general election =

- 3 September 2020

All 63 seats in the House of Representatives 32 seats needed for a majority
- Turnout: 37.85% (▼10.52pp)
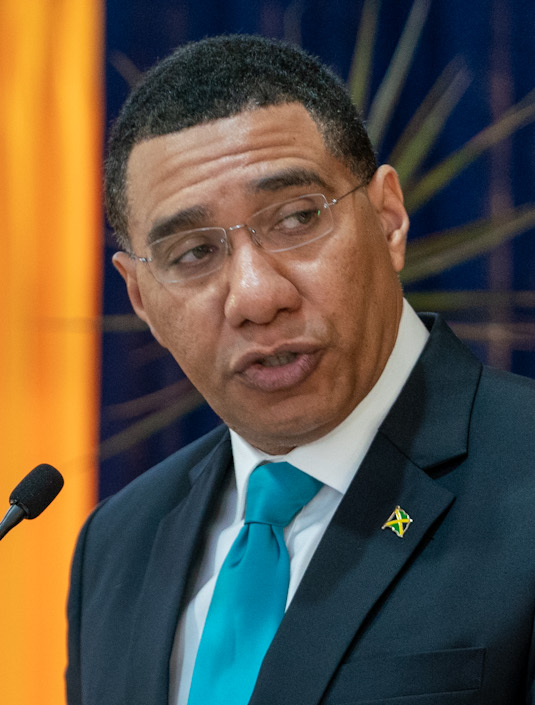

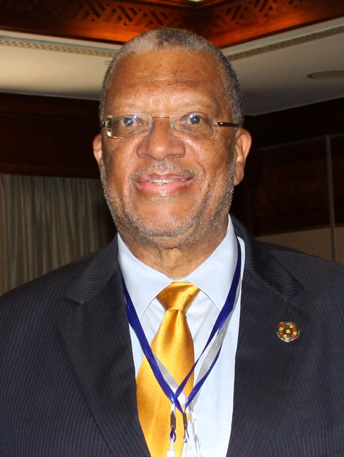
	First party	Second party
Leader	Andrew Holness	Peter Phillips
Party	JLP	PNP
Last election	50.08%, 32 seats	49.71%, 31 seats
Seats won	49	14
Seat change	▲17	▼17
Popular vote	408,376	305,950
Percentage	57.07%	42.76%
Swing	▲6.99pp	▼6.95pp
Prime Minister before election
Andrew Holness
JLP
Prime Minister after election
Andrew Holness
JLP

General elections were held in Jamaica on Thursday, 3 September 2020 to elect 63 members of Parliament. As the constitution stipulates a five-year parliamentary term, the next elections were not expected until between 25 February and 10 June 2021. However, Prime Minister Andrew Holness called early elections to ensure a united response to the ongoing COVID-19 pandemic. On the advice of Holness, Governor General Patrick Allen dissolved Parliament on 13 August 2020.

The result was a landslide victory for the ruling Jamaica Labour Party, which received 57% of the vote and won 49 seats; the People's National Party remained the opposition party, losing 16 seats. Amid the COVID-19 pandemic and the 2019–2020 dengue fever epidemic, voter turnout was only 38%, the lowest in an election since 1983.

== Background ==
Prior to the election, the Jamaica Labour Party, led by Prime Minister Andrew Holness, formed a majority government. The largest opposition party was the People's National Party, led by Peter Phillips. Either the Jamaica Labour Party or the People's National Party have been in power since universal suffrage was introduced in 1944.

== Electoral system ==
The 63 members of the House of Representatives are elected in single-member constituencies by first-past-the-post voting. Voters must be 18 years and over and be a citizen of Jamaica or a Commonwealth citizen.

The leader of the party commanding a majority of support in the House of Representatives is called on by the Governor General to form a government as Prime Minister, while the leader of the largest group or coalition not in government becomes the Leader of the Opposition.

== Campaign ==
Only two parties registered to contest the election, the Jamaica Labour Party and the People's National Party, and each nominated candidates in all 63 constituencies. The two parties agreed to participate in three televised debates hosted by the Jamaica Debates Commission.

The People's National Party campaigned for a referendum on removing Queen Elizabeth II as head of state.

On 15 August 2020, the pastors of the Christian right Jamaica Progressive Party announced that the party would not contest the elections due to lack of time to prepare.

=== Contesting parties ===
Party	Position	Ideology	Leader (since)	Last election	At dissolution	Contested
Jamaica Labour Party	Centre-right	Nationalism; Fiscal conservatism Populism; Conservatism; Republicanism; Fabianism (originally)	Andrew Holness (January 2010)	32 / 63 (51%)	34 / 63 (54%)	63
People's National Party	Centre-left	Social democracy Democratic socialism Populism; Republicanism	Peter Phillips (November 2017)	31 / 63 (49%)	29 / 63 (46%)	63

=== Slogans and songs ===
Party	Slogan	Official song
JLP	"Build back stronger."	#GreenLight
PNP	"Building your Jamaica."	Building Your Jamaica: #VotePNP2020

=== Incumbent MPs not seeking re-election ===
Seven members of parliament did not stand for re-election:

Retiring incumbent		Electoral District	Term in office	Reason	Date announced	Replaced as MP by
Robert Pickersgill	PNP	Saint Catherine North Western	1989–2020	Not standing	22 August 2017	Hugh Graham
Evon Redman	PNP	Saint Elizabeth North Eastern	2016–2020	Not standing	10 May 2018	Delroy Slowley
Derrick Kellier	PNP	Saint James Southern	1987–2020	Not standing	28 May 2018	Homer Davis
Ronald Thwaites	PNP	Kingston Central	1997–2020	Not standing	22 May 2019	Donovan Williams
Noel Arscott	PNP	Clarendon South Western	2007–2020	Not standing	14 September 2019	Lothan Cousins
Shahine Robinson	JLP	Saint Ann North Eastern	2001–2020	Died in office	29 May 2020	Marsha Smith
Leslie Campbell	JLP	Saint Catherine North Eastern	2016–2020	Not standing	26 June 2020	Kerensia Morrison

=== Candidates ===
Candidate nominations were finalised on nomination day, 18 August 2020. The full candidate list is presented below, along with the incumbent candidates before the election. MPs who are not standing for re-election are marked (†). Government ministers are in bold, and party leaders are in italics.

==== Clarendon Parish ====
Electoral District	Candidates			Incumbent
Electoral District	JLP	PNP	Other	Incumbent
Clarendon Central	**Michael Henry**	Zuleika Jess		**Michael Henry**
Clarendon North Central	Robert Nesta Morgan	Desmond Brennan		Pearnel Charles
Clarendon North Western	Phillip Henriquez	Richard Azan	Merrick Cohen (Ind.)	Richard Azan
Clarendon Northern	Dwight Sibblies	Horace Dalley		Horace Dalley
Clarendon South Eastern	**Pearnel Charles Jr**	Patricia Duncan Sutherland		**Pearnel Charles Jr**
Clarendon South Western	Kent Gammon	Lothan Cousins		† Noel Arscott

==== Hanover Parish ====
Electoral District	Candidates		Incumbent
Electoral District	JLP	PNP	Incumbent
Hanover Eastern	Dave Hume-Brown	Wavell Hinds	Dave Hume-Brown
Hanover Western	Tamika Davis	Ian Hayles	Ian Hayles

==== Kingston Parish ====
Electoral District	Candidates		Incumbent
Electoral District	JLP	PNP	Incumbent
Kingston Central	Donovan Williams	Imani Duncan-Price	† Ronald Thwaites
Kingston East & Port Royal	Egwugwu Priestly	Phillip Paulwell	Phillip Paulwell
Kingston Western	**Desmond McKenzie**	Joseph Witter	**Desmond McKenzie**

==== Manchester Parish ====
Electoral District	Candidates			Incumbent
Electoral District	JLP	PNP	Other	Incumbent
Manchester Central	Rhoda Moy Crawford	Peter Bunting	Rohan Chung (Ind.)	Peter Bunting
Manchester North Eastern	**Audley Shaw**	Donald Jackson		**Audley Shaw**
Manchester North Western	Damion Young	Mikael Phillips		Mikael Phillips
Manchester Southern	Robert Chin	Michael Stewart		Michael Stewart

==== Portland Parish ====
Electoral District	Candidates		Incumbent
Electoral District	JLP	PNP	Incumbent
Portland Eastern	Ann-Marie Vaz	Bishop Purcell Jackson	Ann-Marie Vaz
Portland Western	**Daryl Vaz**	Valerie Neita Robertson	**Daryl Vaz**

==== Saint Andrew Parish ====
Electoral District	Candidates		Incumbent
Electoral District	JLP	PNP	Incumbent
Saint Andrew East Central	Jodian Myrie	Peter Phillips	Peter Phillips
Saint Andrew East Rural	Juliet Holness	Joan Gordon-Webley	Juliet Holness
Saint Andrew Eastern	**Fayval Williams**	Venesha Phillips	**Fayval Williams**
Saint Andrew North Central	**Karl Samuda**	O'Neil Lynch	**Karl Samuda**
Saint Andrew North Eastern	**Delroy Chuck**	David Tulloch	**Delroy Chuck**
Saint Andrew North Western	**Nigel Clarke**	Rohan Banks	**Nigel Clarke**
Saint Andrew South Eastern	Kari Douglas	Julian Robinson	Julian Robinson
Saint Andrew South Western	Moureen Lorne	Angela Brown-Burke	Angela Brown-Burke
Saint Andrew Southern	Victor Hyde	Mark Golding	Mark Golding
Saint Andrew West Central	**Andrew Holness**	Patrick Roberts	**Andrew Holness**
Saint Andrew West Rural	Juliet Cuthbert-Flynn	Krystal Tomlinson	Juliet Cuthbert-Flynn
Saint Andrew Western	Dorlan Francis	Anthony Hylton	Anthony Hylton

==== Saint Ann Parish ====
Electoral District	Candidates			Incumbent
Electoral District	JLP	PNP	Other	Incumbent
Saint Ann North Eastern	Marsha Smith	Keith Brown		Marsha Smith
Saint Ann North Western	Krystal Lee	Dayton Campbell	Peter Shand (Ind.)	Dayton Campbell
Saint Ann South Eastern	Delroy Granston	Lisa Hanna		Lisa Hanna
Saint Ann South Western	**Zavia Mayne**	Valenton Wint		**Zavia Mayne**

==== Saint Catherine Parish ====
Electoral District	Candidates			Incumbent
Electoral District	JLP	PNP	Other	Incumbent
Saint Catherine Central	**Olivia Grange**	Maurice Westney		**Olivia Grange**
Saint Catherine East Central	**Alando Terrelonge**	Raymond Pryce		**Alando Terrelonge**
Saint Catherine Eastern	Dwight Pecoo	Denise Daley		Denise Daley
Saint Catherine North Central	Natalie Campbell Rodriques	Natalie Neita-Headley	John Henry (Ind.); Lloyd Smith (Ind.)	Natalie Neita-Headley
Saint Catherine North Eastern	Kerensia Morrison	Oswest Senior-Smith		**† Leslie Campbell**
Saint Catherine North Western	Newton Amos	Hugh Graham	Gene Guthrie (Ind.)	† Robert Pickersgill
Saint Catherine South Central	Andrew Wheatley	Kurt Matthews		Andrew Wheatley
Saint Catherine South Eastern	Robert Miller	Colin Fagan		Colin Fagan
Saint Catherine South Western	**Everald Warmington**	Kurt Waul	Upton Blake (Ind.)	**Everald Warmington**
Saint Catherine Southern	Delroy Dobney	Fitz Jackson		Fitz Jackson
Saint Catherine West Central	**Christopher Tufton**	Kenyama Brown		**Christopher Tufton**

==== Saint Elizabeth Parish ====
Electoral District	Candidates		Incumbent
Electoral District	JLP	PNP	Incumbent
Saint Elizabeth North Eastern	Delroy Slowley	Basil White	† Evon Redman
Saint Elizabeth North Western	**William J.C. Hutchinson**	Ryan Keating	**William J.C. Hutchinson**
Saint Elizabeth South Western	**Floyd Green**	Ewan Stephenson	**Floyd Green**
Saint Elizabeth South Eastern	**Franklyn Witter**	Dwaine Spencer	**Franklyn Witter**

==== Saint James Parish ====
Electoral District	Candidates			Incumbent
Electoral District	JLP	PNP	Other	Incumbent
Saint James Central	Heroy Clarke	Andre Hylton	Ras-Astor Black (Ind.)	Heroy Clarke
Saint James East Central	**Edmund Bartlett**	Michael Hemmings		**Edmund Bartlett**
Saint James North Western	**Horace Chang**	George Hamilton		**Horace Chang**
Saint James Southern	Homer Davis	Walton Small		† Derrick Kellier
Saint James West Central	Marlene Malahoo Forte	Andre Haughton		Marlene Malahoo Forte

==== Saint Mary Parish ====
Electoral District	Candidates		Incumbent
Electoral District	JLP	PNP	Incumbent
Saint Mary Central	Lennon Richards	Morais Guy	Morais Guy
Saint Mary South Eastern	Norman Dunn	Shane Alexis	Norman Dunn
Saint Mary Western	**Robert Montague**	Jason Stanford	**Robert Montague**

==== Saint Thomas Parish ====
Electoral District	Candidates		Incumbent
Electoral District	JLP	PNP	Incumbent
Saint Thomas Eastern	**Michelle Charles**	Fenton Ferguson	Fenton Ferguson
Saint Thomas Western	**James Robertson**	Marsha Francis	James Robertson

==== Trelawny Parish ====
Electoral District	Candidates			Incumbent
Electoral District	JLP	PNP	Other	Incumbent
Trelawny Northern	Tova Hamilton	Victor Wright Jnr	Genieve Dawkins (Ind.)	Victor Wright
Trelawny Southern	Marisa Dalrymple-Philibert	Lloyd Gillings	Richard Sharpe (Ind.)	Marisa Dalrymple-Philibert

==== Westmoreland Parish ====
Electoral District	Candidates			Incumbent
Electoral District	JLP	PNP	Other	Incumbent
Westmoreland Central	George Wright (became independent MP in 2021)	Dwayne Vaz	George Wright (Ind.) Torraino Beckford (Ind.); Don Foote (Ind.) (Note: Foote is a JLP member contesting the election independently as the "Jamaica Abolitionist Movement".)	Dwayne Vaz
Westmoreland Eastern (Note: The initial count ended in a tie that was decided in favour of incumbent Luther Buchanan. However, Daniel Lawrence was declared the winner after a recount.)	Daniel Lawrence	Luther Buchanan	Haile Mika'el (Ind.)	Luther Buchanan
Westmoreland Western	Morland Wilson	Wykeham McNeill		Wykeham McNeill

=== Marginal seats ===
The following lists identify and rank seats using the vote margin by which the party's candidate finished behind the winning candidate in the 2015 election. This vote margin is given as a percentage of all eligible voters in the district.

For information purposes only, seats that have changed hands through subsequent by elections have been noted. Seats whose members have changed party allegiance are ignored.

Marginal seats by party (with winning parties and margins from the 2016 Jamaican general election)
Jamaica Labour Party (JLP)			People's National Party (PNP)		
Marginal
1	Saint Mary South Eastern (Note: Later gained by the JLP in a by-election on 30 October 2017, by a margin of 36.26% over the PNP.)	0.02%	1	Saint Catherine North Eastern	0.53%
2	Saint James Southern	0.24%	2	Saint Andrew Eastern	0.62%
3	Saint Ann North Western	1.18%	3	Saint Elizabeth South Eastern	0.69%
4	Trelawny Northern	1.24%	4	Saint Thomas Western	1.08%
5	Saint Catherine South Eastern	1.49%	5	Saint Ann South Western	1.34%
6	Westmoreland Central	2.70%	6	Hanover Eastern	1.44%
7	Saint Catherine North Western	3.05%	7	Saint Andrew East Rural	1.83%
8	Manchester Central	3.17%	8	Saint Catherine East Central	1.97%
9	Clarendon Northern	3.21%	9	Clarendon North Central	2.42%
10	Clarendon North Western	3.57%	10	Clarendon South Eastern	2.44%
11	Manchester Southern	3.77%	11	Saint Elizabeth North Western	4.34%
12	Westmoreland Western	4.49%	12	Saint James West Central	4.67%
13	Saint Catherine North Central	4.59%	13	Saint Andrew West Rural	5.69%
14	Saint Elizabeth North Eastern	4.79%	14	Manchester North Eastern	5.86%
15	Hanover Western	4.82%	15	Saint Elizabeth South Western	6.81%
16	Saint Thomas Eastern	5.41%	16	Saint James Central	6.85%
17	Kingston Central	5.78%	17	Saint Andrew West Central	7.05%
18	Portland Eastern (Note: Later gained by the JLP in a by-election on 4 April 2019, by a margin of 1.62% over the PNP.)	6.62%	18	Portland Western	7.14%
19	Clarendon South Western	6.67%	19	Saint Catherine South Western	7.43%
20	Manchester North Western	6.75%	20	Saint Ann North Eastern	7.83%
21	Saint Mary Central	7.10%	21	Saint James East Central	8.06%
22	Saint Catherine Southern	7.12%	22	Saint Andrew North Western	8.47%
23	Saint Andrew East Central	7.44%	23	Saint Mary Western	9.80%
24	Saint Catherine Eastern	7.61%	24	Trelawny Southern	10.70%
25	Saint Andrew South Eastern	9.78%	25	Saint James North Western	11.85%
26	Saint Andrew Western	10.43%	26	Saint Andrew North Eastern	12.05%
27	Westmoreland Eastern	10.52%	27	Saint Andrew North Central	12.39%
28	Saint Ann South Eastern	10.98%	28	Saint Catherine West Central	13.43%
29	Kingston East and Port Royal	25.20%	29	Clarendon Central	15.33%
30	Saint Andrew Southern	36.37%	30	Saint Catherine South Central	20.47%
31	Saint Andrew South Western	40.79%	31	Saint Catherine Central	24.94%
Safe			32	Kingston Western	34.83%
			**Safe**		
Source: General Election 2016 - Electoral Commission of Jamaica

== Opinion polls ==
Don Anderson, CEO of Market Research Services Limited, Larren Peart, founder and CEO of Bluedot Data Intelligence Limited and Bill Johnson of Johnson's Survey Research Limited Inc have commissioned opinion polling for the general election regularly sampling the electorates' opinions.

Date	Pollster	Sample size	JLP	PNP	Other	Lead
3 September 2020	2020 general election	–	57.1	42.8	0.1	14.3
21–24 August 2020	RJR Gleaner Group/Don Anderson poll	–	37	25	38	12
21–23 August 2020	Jamaica Observer/Bill Johnson poll	1,000	37	23	40	14
20 July–6 August 2020	Nationwide News Network/Bluedot poll	–	52	34	14	18
23 July–3 August 2020	RJR Gleaner Group/Don Anderson poll	–	36	20	44	16
9–12 July 2020	Jamaica Observer/Bill Johnson poll	1,200	36	17	47	19
13–20 June 2020	Mello TV/Bill Johnson poll	1,200	38	19	43	19
12–15 March 2020	Jamaica Observer/Bill Johnson poll	1,200	33	19	48	14
8–18 February 2020	RJR Gleaner Group/Don Anderson poll	1,038	30	22	48	8
2–19 December 2019	Nationwide News Network/Bluedot poll	–	56	44	0	12
7 August 2019	Don Anderson poll	–	35	30	35	5
2–4 August 2019	One PNP/Bill Johnson poll	1,000	34	32	34	2
28 March 2019	RJR Gleaner Group/Don Anderson poll	1,003	29	18	53	11
12 March 2018	RJR Gleaner Group/Don Anderson poll	–	26	19	55	6
25 February 2016	2016 general election	–	50.1	49.7	0.2	0.4

=== CEAC Solutions polling ===
These polls are used internally by the PNP.

Date	Pollster	Sample size	JLP	PNP	Other	Lead
3 September 2020	2020 general election	–	57.1	42.8	0.1	14.3
28-29 August 2020	CEAC Solutions poll	366	41	44	15	3
25 February 2016	2016 general election	–	50.1	49.7	0.2	0.4

== Results ==
The ECJ reported that 97% of the polling stations had opened by 7:00 AM, and the remaining stations were open by 8:00 AM. The polls closed at 5:00 PM. Election observers included the EU delegation to Jamaica and a domestic NGO, Citizens Action for Free and Fair Elections (CAFFE).

Before 10:00 PM, preliminary results indicated that the JLP had won 44 seats; for the first time since 1967, the JLP was re-elected while contesting all seats. PNP leader Phillips did not give a concession speech, but called Holness privately to offer congratulations. Phillips resigned as PNP leader on 4 September 2020. The full preliminary count indicated a total of 49 seats for the JLP. A tie in Westmoreland Eastern was declared to be won by the JLP after a recount.

PM Holness was sworn in for a new term by Governor-General Sir Patrick Allen on 7 September 2020. The ceremony, which was held at King's House, was restricted to 32 people to comply with public health measures.

Party	Votes	%	+/–	Seats	+/–
Jamaica Labour Party	408,376	57.07	+6.99	49	+17
People's National Party	305,950	42.76	–6.95	14	–17
Independents	1,185	0.17	+0.03	0	0
Total	715,511	100.00	–	63	–
Valid votes	715,511	98.78			
Invalid/blank votes	8,806	1.22			
Total votes	724,317	100.00			
Registered voters/turnout	1,913,410	37.85			
Source: Electoral Commission of Jamaica

== See also ==
- 14th Parliament of Jamaica
