= Constituencies of Jamaica =

House of Representatives
- 15th Parliament of Jamaica

Type
- Type: Lower house of the Parliament of Jamaica
- Seats: 63

Elections
- Voting system: First-past-the-post
- Last election: 3 September 2025
- Next election: 2030

Meeting place
- George William Gordon House, Kingston, Jamaica

Website
- japarliament.gov.jm

Jamaica's fourteen parishes are subdivided into sixty-three constituencies. The country follows the Westminster system and elects sixty-three Members of Parliament (MPs) to the Jamaica House of Representatives.

== History ==
In 1959, 13 new constituencies were created in Jamaica increasing the size of parliament from 32 seats to 45.

== Constituencies ==
Constituencies of Jamaica

The following is the list of constituencies as of the 2025 election.

County	Parish	Constituency
Cornwall	Hanover	Hanover Eastern
Cornwall	Hanover	Hanover Western
Cornwall	Saint Elizabeth	Saint Elizabeth North Eastern
Cornwall	Saint Elizabeth	Saint Elizabeth North Western
Cornwall	Saint Elizabeth	Saint Elizabeth South Eastern
Cornwall	Saint Elizabeth	Saint Elizabeth South Western
Cornwall	Saint James	Saint James Central
Cornwall	Saint James	Saint James East Central
Cornwall	Saint James	Saint James North Western
Cornwall	Saint James	Saint James Southern
Cornwall	Saint James	Saint James West Central
Cornwall	Trelawny	Trelawny Northern
Cornwall	Trelawny	Trelawny Southern
Cornwall	Westmoreland	Westmoreland Central
Cornwall	Westmoreland	Westmoreland Eastern
Cornwall	Westmoreland	Westmoreland Western
Middlesex	Clarendon	Clarendon Central
Middlesex	Clarendon	Clarendon Northern
Middlesex	Clarendon	Clarendon North Central
Middlesex	Clarendon	Clarendon North Western
Middlesex	Clarendon	Clarendon South Eastern
Middlesex	Clarendon	Clarendon South Western
Middlesex	Manchester	Manchester Central
Middlesex	Manchester	Manchester North Eastern
Middlesex	Manchester	Manchester North Western
Middlesex	Manchester	Manchester Southern
Middlesex	Saint Ann	Saint Ann North Eastern
Middlesex	Saint Ann	Saint Ann North Western
Middlesex	Saint Ann	Saint Ann South Eastern
Middlesex	Saint Ann	Saint Ann South Western
Middlesex	Saint Catherine	Saint Catherine Central
Middlesex	Saint Catherine	Saint Catherine Eastern
Middlesex	Saint Catherine	Saint Catherine East Central
Middlesex	Saint Catherine	Saint Catherine North Central
Middlesex	Saint Catherine	Saint Catherine North Eastern
Middlesex	Saint Catherine	Saint Catherine North Western
Middlesex	Saint Catherine	Saint Catherine Southern
Middlesex	Saint Catherine	Saint Catherine South Central
Middlesex	Saint Catherine	Saint Catherine South Eastern
Middlesex	Saint Catherine	Saint Catherine South Western
Middlesex	Saint Catherine	Saint Catherine West Central
Middlesex	Saint Mary	Saint Mary Central
Middlesex	Saint Mary	Saint Mary South Eastern
Middlesex	Saint Mary	Saint Mary Western
Surrey	Kingston	Kingston Central
Surrey	Kingston	Kingston East & Port Royal
Surrey	Kingston	Kingston Western
Surrey	Portland	Portland Eastern
Surrey	Portland	Portland Western
Surrey	Saint Andrew	Saint Andrew Eastern
Surrey	Saint Andrew	Saint Andrew East Central
Surrey	Saint Andrew	Saint Andrew East Rural
Surrey	Saint Andrew	Saint Andrew North Central
Surrey	Saint Andrew	Saint Andrew North Eastern
Surrey	Saint Andrew	Saint Andrew North Western
Surrey	Saint Andrew	Saint Andrew Southern
Surrey	Saint Andrew	Saint Andrew South Eastern
Surrey	Saint Andrew	Saint Andrew South Western
Surrey	Saint Andrew	Saint Andrew Western
Surrey	Saint Andrew	Saint Andrew West Central
Surrey	Saint Andrew	Saint Andrew West Rural
Surrey	Saint Thomas	Saint Thomas Eastern
Surrey	Saint Thomas	Saint Thomas Western
