= Shadow Cabinet of Jamaica =

Theoretical alternative cabinet to the Jamaican government

The Shadow Cabinet of Jamaica (usually known simply as The Shadow Cabinet) is, in the Westminster system of government in traditional constitutional theory, an alternative to the cabinet who scrutinize their corresponding Cabinet of Jamaica ministers, develop alternative policies, and hold the Government to account for its actions and responses. Since February 2016, the People's National Party has been His Majesty's Loyal Opposition in Jamaica, and its leadership therefore forms the current Shadow Cabinet.

== Composition ==
=== His Majesty's Most Loyal Opposition ===
The opposition of Jamaica, formally referred to as His Majesty's Jamaican Government, consists of senior members of His Majesty's Loyal Opposition who scrutinise their corresponding government ministers, develop alternative policies, hold the government to account for its actions and responses, and act as spokespeople for the opposition party in their own specific policy area

The current composition of the Shadow Cabinet of Jamaica was chosen by Leader of the Opposition (Jamaica), Mark Golding on December 3, 2020, following his ascension as President of the People's National Party succeeding Peter Phillips.

=== Opposition Spokespersons of Second Administration ===
Ministry or Department	Minister	Ministerial title	Since
Office of the Leader of the Opposition	Mark Golding, MP	Leader of the Opposition Opposition Spokesperson on Defence	December 3, 2020
Ministry of Finance, Planning and the Public Service	Julian Robinson, MP	Opposition Spokesperson on Finance, Planning and the Public Service	December 3, 2020
Ministry of Foreign Affairs and Foreign Trade	Lisa Hanna, MP	Opposition Spokesperson on Foreign Affairs and Foreign Trade	December 3, 2020
Ministry of National Security	Senator Peter Bunting	Leader of Opposition Business in the Senate Opposition Spokesperson on National Security	December 3, 2020
Ministry of Justice and Information	Senator Donna Scott-Mottley	Deputy Leader of Opposition Business in the Senate Opposition Spokesperson on Justice and Information	December 3, 2020
Ministry of Mining and Energy	Phillip Paulwell, MP	Leader of Opposition Business in the House Opposition Spokesperson on Mining and Energy	December 3, 2020
Ministry of Local Government, Community Development & Sports	Natalie Neita-Garvey, MP	Deputy Leader of Opposition Business in the House Opposition Spokesperson on Local Government, Community Development & Sports	December 3, 2020
Ministry of Industry, Investment and Global Logistics	Anthony Hylton, MP	Opposition Spokesperson on Industry, Investment and Global Logistics	December 3, 2020
Ministry of Labour and Social Security	Dr. Angela Brown-Burke, MP	Opposition Spokesperson on Labour and Social Security	December 3, 2020
Ministry of Tourism and Linkages	Senator Janice Allen	Opposition Spokesperson on Tourism and Linkages	December 3, 2020
Ministry of Health and Wellness	Dr. Morais Guy, MP	Opposition Spokesperson on Health and Wellness	December 3, 2020
Ministry of Education, Training & Competitiveness	Senator Damion Crawford	Opposition Spokesperson on Education, Training & Competitiveness	December 3, 2020
Ministry of Transport and Works	Makael Phillips, MP	Opposition Spokesperson on Transport and Works	December 3, 2020
Ministry of Water and Agriculture	Lothan Cousins, MP	Opposition Spokesperson on Water and Agriculture	December 3, 2020
Ministry of Gender, Culture & Social Transformation	Denice Daley, MP	Opposition Spokesperson on Gender, Culture & Social Transformation	December 3, 2020
Ministry of Land, Environment and Climate Change	Senator Sophia Fraser Binns	Opposition Spokesperson on Land, Environment and Climate Change	December 3, 2020
Ministry of Commerce, Science and Technology	Hugh Graham, MP	Opposition Spokesperson on Commerce, Science and Technology	December 3, 2020
Ministry of Mining and Energy	Phillip Paulwell, MP	Leader of Opposition Business in the House Opposition Spokesperson on Mining and Energy	December 3, 2020
Ministry of Housing and Sustainable Living	Senator Dr. Floyd Morris	Opposition Spokesperson on Housing and Sustainable Living	December 3, 2020
Ministry of Youth and Entertainment	Senator Gabriela Morris	Opposition Spokesperson on Youth and Entertainment	December 3, 2020

=== Opposition Spokespersons without Portfolio ===
Ministry or Department	Minister	Ministerial title	Since
Ministry of Gender, Culture & Social Transformation	Patricia Duncan-Sutherland	Opposition Spokesperson on Gender, Culture & Social Transformation	December 3, 2020
Ministry of Commerce, Science & Technology	Dr. Andre Haughton	Opposition Spokesperson on Entrepreneurship and Innovation	December 3, 2020
The Office of the Leader of the Opposition	Raymond Pryce	Opposition Spokesperson on Information	December 3, 2020
Ministry of Finance, Planning and the Public Service	Senator Lambert Brown	Opposition Spokesperson on Special Abilities	December 3, 2020

- Politics of Jamaica
- Governor-General of Jamaica
- Prime Minister of Jamaica
- Leader of the Opposition (Jamaica)
- Cabinet of Jamaica
