= Zuleika Jess =

Jamaican politician

MP for Saint Elizabeth North Eastern
- Incumbent
- Assumed office 3 September 2025
- Preceded by: Delroy Slowley

Personal details
- Party: People's National Party

Zuleika Amadie Jess is a Jamaican politician from the People's National Party who has been MP for Saint Elizabeth North Eastern since 2025.

Jess is a lawyer by profession. She contested Clarendon Central at the 2020 Jamaican general election.
