= Sharon Hay-Webster =

Jamaican politician (born 1961)

Member of Parliament for Saint Catherine South Central
- In office 1997–2012
- Preceded by: Heather Robinson
- Succeeded by: Denise Daley

Personal details
- Party: Jamaica Labour Party (formerly a member of the People's National Party)
- Education: University of the West Indies

Sharon Hay-Webster (born 29 September 1961) is a Jamaican politician. She was a member of the House of Representatives of the Parliament of Jamaica from 1997 to 2012, representing the People's National Party. She came to international attention after the 2004 Haitian coup d'état, when she escorted Jean-Bertrand Aristide from his temporary exile in the Central African Republic to Jamaica at the invitation of then-Prime Minister of Jamaica P. J. Patterson.

Hay-Webster's third term in parliament was marred by a controversy over her citizenship of the United States, leading her to announce in 2009 that she would renounce U.S. citizenship. However, in 2011 it came to light through the United States diplomatic cables leak that she had withdrawn her application for renunciation, meaning she remained a U.S. citizen. As the ongoing controversy heated up, Hay-Webster resigned from the PNP, and her former party called for her to step down from her parliamentary seat as well. Her resignation from the PNP made her only the third independent politician in 19 years to sit in parliament. Hay-Webster joined the Jamaica Labour Party in November 2011 before losing her seat in parliament in the 2011 Jamaican general election.

== Entry into politics ==
Prior to entering politics. Hay-Webster was a lecturer at the University of Technology, Jamaica. She had also worked as an employee of the Social Development Commission, then part of the Ministry of Youth and Community Development. The man who would become her husband initially opposed her ambition to become a politician. She first ran for election in 1997 under the PNP banner, easily beating Jamaica Labour Party candidate Tom Tavares-Finson to win the race in the South Central St. Catherine constituency, succeeding PNP incumbent Heather Robinson. The seat itself was a long-time PNP stronghold, having previously been held by Ripton MacPherson and then Derrick Heaven. She was returned to her seat in the 2002 elections, part of a widespread PNP victory which saw them retain their parliamentary majority for a record fourth straight term.

== Second term ==
=== Bringing Aristide to Jamaica ===
The major highlight of Hay-Webster's second term was her March 2004 trip to the Central African Republic on behalf of Jamaican Prime Minister P. J. Patterson and the Caribbean Community, to meet with Jean-Bertrand Aristide after he was ousted in the 2004 Haitian coup d'état and to discuss his desire to return to Haiti. She was part of a larger delegation which also included African American dignitaries, namely TransAfrica Forum founder Randall Robinson and U.S. congresswoman Maxine Waters. She described the visit as tense: at the time, the CAR was marking one year since the coup by François Bozizé, and the CAR government put out a heavy military presence in anticipation of trouble. She then escorted Aristide to Jamaica, in what she later described as a "humanitarian action" and not a political one. Aristide would remain in Jamaica until the end of May, when he left for South Africa.

=== Controversies ===
In July 2003, during a parliamentary debate on childcare, Hay-Webster suggested that young women with three or more children be subject to compulsory sterilisation. Opposition parliamentarian Ernie Smith spoke out in favour of the idea, and further suggested that schoolgirls undergo regular virginity tests in order to clamp down on teenage pregnancy. Local businessman Sameer Younis also made public statements in support of her idea. In contrast, Vernon Daley, a columnist for the Jamaica Gleaner, described Hay-Webster as making a fool of herself by proposing outdated ideas based on shallow thinking. Another Gleaner column derided Hay-Webster's idea as "medieval". Spokespersons for local human rights organisation Jamaicans for Justice and women's rights groups Women's Inc. and Women's Media Watch also described the proposals as crazy, invasive, and gender-biased.

Hay-Webster's second term in office was also punctuated by controversies over Spanish Town gang violence between Oliver "Bubba" Smith's One Order gang and Donovan "Bulbie" Bennett's Clansman gang, the former supporters of the JLP and the latter of Hay-Webster's own PNP. In February 2004, fighting broke out between the two rival gangs, leaving 19 dead. The trigger for the violence was reported to be a conflict over control of the lucrative protection racket surrounding the town's bus terminal. In the aftermath, Hay-Webster made public statements distancing herself from the violence and claiming she had no ties to the gang leaders, earning her criticism even from fellow PNP member and former South Central St. Catherine MP Heather Robinson. After the killing of Bennett in November 2005, Clansman members publicly proclaimed that they were withdrawing their support for the PNP. Hay-Webster admitted that she previously had dealings with Bennett's followers, and expressed confidence that she could win back their support, but denied that she had any dealings with Bennett himself. However, in later years she crossed party lines to work with fellow woman politician and neighbouring South East St. Catherine MP Olivia Grange, successfully reducing gang violence.

=== Re-election campaign ===
In her re-election campaign for the 2007 elections, Hay-Webster faced off against Devon McDaniel, a JLP member who had formerly represented the South Trelawny constituency but withdrew from politics in 2005, only to announce in February 2007 that he would stand against Hay-Webster for the St. Catherine seat instead. Media reports suggested that the PNP could face a strong challenge from the JLP in the race for the South East and South Central seats in St. Catherine. Hay-Webster and her opponents signed a Political Code of Conduct pledging to keep the elections violence-free. On Nomination Day (8 August), Webster and McDaniel both turned out with marches of hundreds supporters to the nomination centre at Spanish Village Plaza in Spanish Town; the police were called out, but the rival groups mingled without violence. Hay-Webster herself was returned to her seat, but the PNP as a whole lost their parliamentary majority.

== Third term ==
=== Citizenship controversy ===
The major issue in Hay-Webster's third term would be her U.S. citizenship, part of a larger battle between the JLP and the PNP over foreign citizenships held by their respective members which broke out almost immediately after the 2007 elections. The JLP won a slim majority, but immediately faced challenges in the victories of two of their members. According to Article 40 of the Constitution of Jamaica, "[n]o person shall be qualified to be appointed as a Senator or elected as a member of the House of Representatives who is, by virtue of his own act, under any acknowledgment of allegiance, obedience or adherence to a foreign Power or State" (though Article 39 exempts Commonwealth citizens from this limitation). At the time, media reports about the citizenship controversies noted that Hay-Webster had been a U.S. citizen and later naturalised as a Jamaican, making her the only naturalised MP, but no indication was given that she remained a U.S. citizen. In late April 2008, Hay-Webster's retention of U.S. citizenship came to light. Jamaican PM Bruce Golding and other JLP members, responding to continuing criticism over the U.S. citizenship of JLP member Daryl Vaz (whose candidacy had been struck down by the Supreme Court of Jamaica) pointed out in parliament that a member of the PNP was in a similar citizenship situation as Vaz. The MP in question was not named in parliamentary debate, but JLP members gave media interviews in the following week, leading to the revelation that Golding was referring to Hay-Webster. The Supreme Court, in ruling against Vaz, stated that acquiring, renewing, and travelling on a United States passport were all acts of allegiance to a foreign power; Hay-Webster stated that her case was not at all analogous to Vaz', because her US passport had long expired and she had never renewed it; she further emphasised that she had no economic or other ties to the United States, and had never even filed a tax return there. Nevertheless, the PNP consulted with its lawyers over the issue, and unconfirmed reports said she had been urged to resign. However, for another year, no one would challenge her eligibility to her seat.

In 2009, the two parties came to a compromise over the citizenship issue: JLP MPs Gregory Mair, Michael Stern, and Shahine Robinson renounce their foreign citizenships, in exchange for a PNP pledge not to contest their seats. However, after Mair was removed from Parliament by court order, the PNP put forth a candidate Granville Valentine in his constituency for the resulting by-election, leading to the breakdown of the agreement. PM Golding then filed constitutional motions against PNP members Ian Hayles and Hay-Webster in May 2009. In August 2009, Hay-Webster seemed to be ready to surrender on the issue, making a public statement that she would renounce her US citizenship. However, even after that announcement, the JLP was still said to be getting ready to serve court papers against her, as part of their larger strategy leading up to the by-elections triggered by Stern's resignation. Hay-Webster came under heavy pressure from influential constituents to relinquish her seat, and in December 2009 she was said to be in discussions with fellow PNP member and onetime MP Colin Campbell about the possibility for him to run for her seat.

The citizenship issue continued to drag out over the following year. In early June 2010, the JLP made a motion in parliament to unseat Hay-Webster, soon after JLP Shahine Robinson had been removed from her own seat following a challenge by PNP member Manley Bowen, leaving the JLP with just a 31-28 majority in parliament. Later that month, she announced that she would not be seeking a fourth term in office, though she denied that the citizenship issue had anything to do with her decision. A Jamaica Gleaner editorial in September 2010 decried her behaviour as "shameless". In December 2010, the JLP made an application to the Supreme Court of Jamaica challenging Hay-Webster's eligibility to sit in parliament due to the fact of her having been a U.S. citizen at the time of the 2007 elections. Hay-Webster declined to comment on the issue. It is possible that the court may retroactively disqualifies her candidacy all the way back to her original election in 1997, meaning that she might lose her entitlement to a parliamentary pension, granted to members of parliament who serve for more than two terms. In response to the challenge, the PNP stated that it would uphold the constitution, but also expressed concern that the challenge had been filed so late in Hay-Webster's term, possibly contravening the Election Petitions Act. The court papers were finally served on 13 January 2011, with the hearing date set for 17 February. The issue seemed to be going nowhere; in March 2011, Golding admitted he had been dragging out the resolution of the citizenship issue in order to avoid undermining his party's majority in parliament.

However, new developments would be seen in the controversy over Hay-Webster's citizenship issues due to the United States diplomatic cables leak. According to a leaked cable reported by the Jamaica Gleaner, Hay-Webster had visited the US embassy in Kingston to renounce her United States citizenship on 31 July 2009, but returned four days later to withdraw the renunciation. Hay-Webster gave no immediate response to the matter, stating only that her lawyer had advised her to withhold comment. Hay-Webster later stated that she had changed her mind on her renunciation after advice from local and foreign lawyers, stating that her circumstances differed from the facts of previous Supreme Court cases on dual citizen MPs. Jamaica Observer columnist Clare Forrester spoke out in support of Hay-Webster; however, broader public opinion was turning against her.

=== Party membership ===
As early as 2008, it had been speculated that Hay-Webster's days with the PNP might be numbered. That year, she threw her support behind Peter Phillips' candidacy for the presidency of the PNP against incumbent Portia Simpson Miller; however, Phillips lost his bid, placing Hay-Webster in an increasingly precarious position. In late September, in the aftermath of the failed bid, she stepped down from her position in the PNP's shadow Cabinet; the PNP also removed from the parliament's crime committee with no advance notice. In 2010, she gave an interview to the Jamaica Gleaner in which she expressed regret that she had been unable to emulate Michael Manley's social impact of the 1970s which had inspired her to enter politics in the first place.

In June 2011, after Hay-Webster's retention of U.S. citizenship was revealed, controversy inside the PNP grew, and on 28 June, she resigned from the PNP, bitterly complaining of "abuse and lack of support" from the party. She also criticised the party for "focus[ing] on power rather than principle", echoing complaints over the preceding decade about Portia Simpson Miller's leadership made by fellow party members such as Region Three functionary Paul Burke and PNP Youth Organisation chairman Damion Crawford. In response to Hay-Webster, PNP general secretary Peter Bunting said that Hay-Webster had a credibility problem, and called on her to follow up on her withdrawal from the party by stepping down from parliament rather than remaining in her seat as an independent MP. Hay-Webster dropped hints that she might "cross the aisle" and join the JLP instead; JLP general secretary Aundre Franklin was quoted as saying in response that "the doors of the party are open ... but the principles of the JLP will not be held hostage to any negotiations".

In the end, Hay-Webster renounced her U.S. citizenship, receiving a Certificate of Loss of Nationality on 27 October 2011. She denied that this was a precondition of her "crossing the floor" to join the JLP, but JLP spokesman Audley Shaw disputed her account, saying that the JLP had made it clear to her that she had to renounce to become a party member. Shortly after she joined, the JLP suffered landslide losses in the 2011 general election, throwing them back into opposition. Hay-Webster lost her own seat to the PNP's Denise Daley.

== Personal life ==
Hay-Webster was born at Mountainside Hospital in Glen Ridge, New Jersey in the United States. She thus has birthright citizenship there, though she did not publicly admit this until late in her career. Earlier media reports claimed she was born in Kingston, Jamaica. Her grandfather Lucien Hay and father Lloyd Hay were both involved in PNP politics, the former as an assistant to Norman Manley and the latter as the PNP's unsuccessful candidate in the North East St Catherine constituency in the 1976 general election. Her mother was Haitian. Hay-Webster's family moved to Jamaica just a few months after her birth and raised her there. She graduated from St Hugh's Preparatory School and the University of the West Indies. She had long been interested in politics; and in later interviews claimed that the most exciting thing about turning 18 was that she gained the right to vote. She was especially attracted by the socialist ideals of PM Michael Manley. She applied for Jamaican citizenship in 1987, and took the Oath of Allegiance the following year. She married after entering politics. She and her husband would go on to have two children, but later divorced. Her uncle Calvin Fitz-Henley was murdered in downtown Kingston in May 2008.
