= Donovan Williams (politician) =

Jamaican politician

The Honourable Donovan Williams MP

Minister of State in the Ministry of Labour and Social Security
- Incumbent
- Assumed office September 2025
- Minister: Pearnel Charles Jr.

MP for Kingston Central
- Incumbent
- Assumed office 7 September 2020
- Preceded by: Ronald Thwaites

Personal details
- Born: August 28, 1978 (age 48) Lionel Town, Jamaica
- Party: Jamaica Labour Party
- Relations: Delroy Williams (brother)
- Education: University of the West Indies (LLB)

Donovan St. Ledger Williams is a Jamaican politician from the Labour Party who has been MP for Kingston Central since 2020.

== Political career ==
Williams was first elected in the 2020 Jamaican general election. In the 2025 Jamaican general election, he defeated Steve McGreggor despite initial reports showing him being unseated. In September 2025, Williams was appointed minister of state in the Ministry of Labour and Social Security.

== Personal life ==
His brother Delroy Williams is an MP for Clarendon Central.
