= Sibblies =

Sibblies is a Jamaican surname. Notable people with the surname include:

- Dwight Sibblies, Jamaican politician
- Jackie Sibblies Drury, American playwright
- Leroy Sibblies (born 1949), Jamaican musician and producer
