= Manchester North East =

Manchester North East may refer to:

- Manchester North East (UK Parliament constituency)
- Manchester North Eastern (Jamaica Parliament constituency)
