= Evon Redman =

Jamaican politician

Evon Redman MP

MP for Saint Elizabeth North Eastern
- In office 25 February 2016 – 7 September 2020
- Preceded by: Raymond Pryce
- Succeeded by: Delroy Slowley

Personal details
- Party: People's National Party

Evon Redman is a Jamaican politician from the People's National Party. He was Member of Parliament for Saint Elizabeth North Eastern from 2016 to 2020.
