= Robert Montague (Jamaican politician) =

Jamaican politician (born 1965)

The Honourable Robert Montague CD MP

Minister of Economic Growth, and Infrastructure Development
- Incumbent
- Assumed office September 2025

MP for Saint Mary Western
- Incumbent
- Assumed office 2016
Early political career
Minister of Transport and Mining
In office March 2018 – January 2022
Minister of National Security
In office March 2016 – March 2018
Preceded by	Peter Bunting
Succeeded by	Horace Chang
Mayor of Port Maria
In office March 2003 – 2007

Personal details
- Born: Robert St. Aubyn Montague; January 1, 1965 (age 61) Saint Mary, Jamaica
- Party: Jamaican Labour Party
- Education: Saint Mary High School; University of Florida

Robert St. Aubyn Montague (born 1965) is a Jamaican politician with the Jamaica Labour Party. He is currently the minister without portfolio in the Ministry of Economic Growth and Job Creation. He comes from a political family; his father Asquith Nathaniel was a charter member of the JLP. He entered politics in 1990 as a councillor for Carron Hall, Saint Mary Parish. He later became the mayor of Port Maria. In 2012, Opposition Leader Andrew Holness named him a member of the Senate of Jamaica. He is now the Minister of Transport And Mining in the Andrew Holness-led government after winning the 2016 Jamaican general election. He is the MP for the Saint Mary Western constituency.
