= Janice Allen =

Jamaican politician

Member of the Jamaican Senate
- Incumbent
- Assumed office 2020

Personal details
- Born: 1973 or 1974 (age 51–52)
- Party: People's National Party
- Education: Florida International University; UMass Dartmouth (MBA)

Janice Allen (born 1973 or 1974) is a Jamaican politician from the People's National Party (PNP) who is a member of the Senate of Jamaica. Allen attended Montego Bay High School before moving to the United States to attend Florida International University. She graduated with a Bachelor's degree in 1994, and went on to receive a Master of Business Administration from the University of Massachusetts Dartmouth. In 2023, she was appointed Vice President of Socialist International Latin America and the Caribbean.

She was the PNP candidate for Saint James Central at the 2025 Jamaican general election.
