= Kingston Central (Jamaica Parliament constituency) =

Parliamentary constituency of Jamaica

Kingston Central is a parliamentary constituency represented in the House of Representatives of the Jamaican Parliament. It elects one Member of Parliament MP by the first past the post system of election.

== History ==
In the 2025 Jamaican general election, Steve McGreggor from the People's National Party was defeated by Donovan Williams, after provisional reports listed him as the winner.

== Boundaries ==
The constituency covers the Allman Town and Rae Town areas of Kingston.

== Members of Parliament ==
=== 1944 to 1959 ===
Election	Member	Party
1944	Frank Pixley	Jamaica Labour Party
1949	Wills O. Isaacs	People's National Party
1955	Wills O. Isaacs	People's National Party
1959	Constituency abolished	

=== 1962 to 1976 ===
Election	Member	Party
1967	Wills O. Isaacs	People's National Party
1972	Michael Manley	People's National Party
1976	Rose Leon	People's National Party
1976	Constituency abolished	

=== 1989 to present ===
Election	Member	Party
1989	Ralph Brown	People's National Party
1993	Olivia Grange	Jamaica Labour Party
1997	Ronald Thwaites	People's National Party
2002	Victor Cummings	People's National Party
2007	Ronald Thwaites	People's National Party
2011	Ronald Thwaites	People's National Party
2016	Ronald Thwaites	People's National Party
2020	Donovan Williams	Jamaica Labour Party

== Elections ==
General Election 2007: Kingston Central
Party	Candidate	Votes	%	±%
PNP	Ronald Thwaites	5,245	58.71	
JLP	Charlton Collie	3,688	41.29	
Total votes		8,993	100.0	
Turnout			58.88	
PNP hold				
