= Kingston East and Port Royal (Jamaica Parliament constituency) =

Parliamentary constituency of Jamaica

Kingston East and Port Royal is a parliamentary constituency represented in the House of Representatives of the Jamaican Parliament. It elects one Member of Parliament MP by the first past the post system of election. It is one of the original 32 Parliamentary seats.

Its most prominent MP was former Prime Minister Michael Manley.

== Boundaries ==
Constituency includes Norman Gardens, some lower areas of Mountain View Avenue, Rockfort, Windward Road, Port Royal and Springfield.

== Members of Parliament ==
Election	Member	Party
1944	Florizel Glasspole	People's National Party
1976	William Isaacs	People's National Party
1980	Glenmore Webley	Jamaica Labour Party
1983	Anthony Abrahams	Jamaica Labour Party
1989	Michael Manley	People's National Party
1993	Marjorie Taylor	People's National Party
1997	Phillip Paulwell	People's National Party
2002	Phillip Paulwell	People's National Party
2007	Phillip Paulwell	People's National Party
2011	Phillip Paulwell	People's National Party
2016	Phillip Paulwell	People's National Party
2020	Phillip Paulwell	People's National Party
2025	Phillip Paulwell	People's National Party

== Elections ==
General Election 2007: Kingston East and Port Royal
Party	Candidate	Votes	%	±%
PNP	Phillip Paulwell	7,183	82.99	
JLP	Peter Sangster	1,459	16.76	
National Democratic Movement	Opal Slater	21	0.24	
Total votes		8,655	100.0	
Turnout			53.2	
PNP hold				
