= Saint Elizabeth North Eastern =

Parliamentary constituency of Jamaica

Saint Elizabeth North East is number 15 on this map.

Saint Elizabeth North Eastern is a parliamentary constituency represented in the Parliament of Jamaica. It elects one Member of Parliament by the first past the post system of election. The constituency covers the north east part of Saint Elizabeth Parish. Until 2020 it was the only constituency in the parish, out of four, to be held by the PNP.

== Representation ==
Election	Member	Party
2011	Raymond Pryce	People's National Party
2016	Evon Redman	People's National Party
2020	Delroy Slowley	Jamaica Labour Party
2025	Zuleika Jess	People's National Party
