= Saint Andrew West Central (Jamaica Parliament constituency) =

Parliamentary constituency of Jamaica

Saint Andrew West Central is a parliamentary constituency represented in the House of Representatives of the Jamaican Parliament. It elects one Member of Parliament MP by the first past the post system of election. The House of Representatives may consist of 63 members.

The current MP, since 1997, is Andrew Holness, who has been Prime Minister of Jamaica since 2016 and previously from 2011 to 2012.

This constituency encompasses urban communities in the parish of Saint Andrew, including Olympic Gardens, Molynes Gardens, and Seivright Gardens. His administration has emphasized youth training programs, social intervention strategies and housing upgrades.

== Boundaries ==
Consists of Molynes Gardens, Olympic Gardens and Seivright Gardens.

General Election 2025: Saint Andrew West Central
Party	Candidate	Votes	%	±%
JLP	Andrew Holness	7,054	58.75	−5.87
PNP	Paul Buchanan	4,953	41.25	+5.87
Total votes		12,007	100.0	
Turnout			36.70	
JLP hold		Swing	-5.87	

General Election 2020: Saint Andrew West Central
Party	Candidate	Votes	%	±%
JLP	Andrew Holness	7,169	64.62	+6.99
PNP	Patrick Roberts	3,925	35.38	−6.99
Total votes		11,094	100.0	
Turnout			37.49	
JLP hold		Swing	+6.99	

General Election 2016: Saint Andrew West Central
Party	Candidate	Votes	%	±%
JLP	Andrew Holness	8,625	57.63	+3.78
PNP	Patrick Roberts	6,342	42.37	−3.78
Total votes		14,967	100.0	
Turnout			51.30	
JLP hold		Swing	+3.78	

General Election 2011: Saint Andrew West Central
Party	Candidate	Votes	%	±%
JLP	Andrew Holness	7,844	53.85	−0.91
PNP	Patrick Roberts	6,723	46.15	+0.91
Total votes		14,567	100.0	
Turnout			55	
JLP hold		Swing	-0.91	

General Election 2007: Saint Andrew West Central
Party	Candidate	Votes	%	±%
JLP	Andrew Holness	6,987	54.76	
PNP	Patrick Roberts	5,772	45.24	
Total votes		12,759	100.0	
Turnout			60.98	
JLP hold				
