= Mike Henry (politician) =

Jamaican politician

The Honourable Mike Henry OJ CD MP

Minister of State in the Ministry of Local Government
- In office March 2018 – June 2020
- Prime Minister: Edward Seaga

Deputy Leader of Jamaica Labour Party
- In office 1981–1982

Chariman of the Jamaican Labour Party
- In office 2010 – 2012
Other ministerial portfolios
Minister of Labour and Social Security
In office June 2020 – September 2020
Prime Minister	Andrew Holness
Minister of Transport and Mining
In office March 2016 – March 2018
Prime Minister	Andrew Holness
Minister of Transport and Works
In office September 2007 – December 2011
Prime Minister	Bruce Golding; Andrew Holness
Chairman of the Public Accounts Committee
In office 2002–2007
Chairman of the Jamaica Labour Party
In office 2010–2012
Minister of State for Youth and Sports
In office 1989–1992

Member of the Jamaican Parliament for Clarendon Central
- In office 30 October 1980 – September 2025
- Succeeded by: Delroy Williams

Personal details
- Born: Lester Michael Henry; 18 June 1935 (age 91) Spanish Town, Colony of Jamaica, British Empire
- Party: Jamaica Labour Party
- Children: 4
- Education: Ealing Technical College; St. Jago High School
- Occupation: Publisher, author, entrepreneur

L. Michael Henry (born June 1935), C.D., M.P, is the Member of Parliament for Central Clarendon and is the longest serving Jamaican Parliamentarian with more than 30 unbroken years in the Jamaican Parliament.

== Education ==
- Ealing Technical College, United Kingdom- Bachelor of Arts- Marketing
- Beckford and Smith High School (St. Jago High), Jamaica

== Awards ==
- 2002 Order of Distinction- Commander Rank: 20 years of service to Parliament
- 1998 Silver Musgrave Award, Literature

== Political background ==
Served as deputy leader of the Jamaica Labour Party (10) years; Member of Parliament (MP) Central Clarendon since 1980; one of the longest serving MPs in the Jamaican House of Parliament with function and responsibilities as follows:

- 1973 Joined the JLP
- 1975 – 76 Sought to represent a St. Catherine constituency. Chosen by Party to move to Central Clarendon.
- 1976 Unsuccessful campaign for Member of Parliament for Central Clarendon – shot while campaigning in York Town
- 1980 Elected Member of Parliament, Central Clarendon for over 30 years.
- 1981–82 State Minister for Youth and Local Government
- 1982–83 State Minister for Information in the Ministry of Tourism
- 1984–89 State Minister in the Office of the Prime Minister, with responsibility for Culture
- 1989–92 Minister of State for Youth and Sports
- 1982-91 Deputy Leader, Jamaica Labour Party (last nationally elected Deputy Leader at a JLP conference)
- 1980 Member, Public Accounts Committee of Parliament
- 2002–07 Chairman, Public Accounts Committee of Parliament
- 2007–11 Minister of Transport and Works
- 2010–12 Chairman, Jamaica Labour Party
- 2016–18 Minister of Transport and Mining
- 2018– Minister without Portfolio in the Office of the Prime Minister.

== Professional summary ==
- An entrepreneur, compiler, author and publisher:
- Chairman - LMH Publishing Limited, Jamaica
- Chairman - LMH Retail Limited; LMH Retail (Montego Bay) Limited, Jamaica
- Chief Executive Officer- Kingston Publisher Limited, Jamaica
- Managing Director- Far Eastern Publishers Ltd, Jurong, Singapore
- Far East & Central Asia Rep- McGraw Hill Far East Ltd, Singapore
- Central America & Caribbean Rep- Williams Collins Publisher, United Kingdom
- Managing Director- Collins Sangster Publishers, United Kingdom
- Midlands Zone Manager- S & H Stamps, United Kingdom
- Sales and Marketing Manager - Knitting Machine Co., United Kingdom
- Accounts Manager- Grove Shopfitters, Cheswick, London
- Tire Builder - Firestone, United Kingdom

== Publications ==
- Editor- Every Student's Handbook & Jamaican Cocktails and Mixed Drinks
- Author- Rosehall's White Witch: The Legend of Annie Palmer
- Co-author- LMH Dictionary Series, Marley and Me, Beautiful Jamaica-
- Jamaica in Pictures, Reggae Road to Soccer Glory
- Compiler - Bustamante: Portrait of a Hero
- Contributor - Insight Guide Jamaica
- Author - Many Rivers to Cross: A Political Journey of Audacious Hope
