= Franklyn Witter =

Jamaican politician

The Honourable Franklin Witter JP MP

Minister of State in the Ministry of Agriculture, Fisheries, and Mining
- Incumbent
- Assumed office 11 January 2022

Deputy Speaker of the Jamaica House of Representatives
- In office March 2016 – August 2020

Mayor of Black River
- In office 2005–2007

MP for Saint Elizabeth South Eastern
- Incumbent
- Assumed office 2016

Personal details
- Born: June 14, 1959 (age 67) Lititz, Colony of Jamaica
- Party: Jamaica Labour Party

Franklin (Frank) Robert Witter (born 14 June 1959) is a Jamaican politician from the Labour Party. He was appointed Minister of State in the Ministry of Agriculture & Fisheries on 11 January 2022.
