= Floyd Green (Jamaican politician) =

Jamaican politician

The Honourable Floyd Green MP

Minister of Agriculture, Fisheries, and Mining
- Incumbent
- Assumed office 22 May 2023
- Preceded by: Hugh Buchanan
- In office September 2020 – September 2021

MP for Saint Elizabeth South Western
- Incumbent
- Assumed office 25 February 2016

Personal details
- Born: January 10, 1982 (age 44) Saint Elizabeth Parish, Jamaica
- Party: Jamaica Labour Party
- Education: Munro College; University of the West Indies (BA); Norman Manley Law School

Floyd O'Brian Green (born January 10, 1982) is a Jamaican politician from the Labour Party. He has been Member of Parliament for Saint Elizabeth South Western since 2016.

== Education ==
He graduated from Munro College and the University of the West Indies.

== Political career ==
In September 2021, he resigned as Minister of Agriculture and Fisheries after being filmed at a social gathering during COVID-19 lockdown in breach of public health restrictions.

In December 2022, he called for increased support for local police after a number of murders in his constituency.
