= Delroy Slowley =

Jamaican politician

Delroy Slowley MP

MP for Saint Elizabeth North Eastern
- In office 7 September 2020 – 3 September 2025
- Preceded by: Evon Redman
- Succeeded by: Zuleika Jess

Personal details
- Political party: Jamaica Labour Party

Delroy Slowley is a Jamaican politician from the Labour Party.

== Education ==
He graduated from Munro College and the University of Technology, Jamaica.
