= Daniel Lawrence (politician) =

Jamaican politician

Daniel Lawrence MP

MP for Westmoreland Eastern
- Incumbent
- Assumed office 3 September 2020

Personal details
- Party: Jamaica Labour Party

Daniel Lawrence is a Jamaican politician from the Labour Party.
