= Ministry of Economic Growth and Job Creation =

Government ministry of Jamaica

The Ministry of Economic Growth and Job Creation is a ministry of the Government of Jamaica. It was established in February 2016.

It is responsible for 7 portfolio areas:

- Land
- Environment
- Climate change
- Investment
- Water and wastewater
- Housing
- Works

== See also ==
- Ministries and agencies of the Jamaican government
