= Alando Terrelonge =

Jamaican politician

The Honourable Alando Terrelonge MP

Minister of State in the Ministry of Foreign Affairs and Foreign Trade
- Incumbent
- Assumed office 22 May 2023
- Minister: Kamina Johnson Smith

Minister of State in the Ministry of Education, Youth & Information
- In office February 2019 – September 2020

Minister of State in the Ministry of Culture, Gender, Entertainment and Sport
- In office March 2018 – February 2019

MP for Saint Catherine East Central
- Incumbent
- Assumed office 25 February 2016
- Preceded by: Shahine Robinson

Personal details
- Born: Alando Nathaniel Terrelonge; February 15, 1977 (age 49) St. Catherine, Jamaica
- Party: Jamaica Labour Party
- Education: University of the West Indies (LLB); Norman Manley Law School; Warwick University

Alando Nathaniel Terrelonge (born February 15, 1977) is a Jamaican politician from the Jamaica Labour Party (JLP).

== Ministerial offices ==
- March 2018 – Minister of State in the Ministry of Culture, Gender, Entertainment and Sports
- February 2019 – Minister of State in the Ministry of Education, Youth & Information
- September 2020 – Minister of State in the Ministry of Culture, Gender, Entertainment and Sport

== Biography ==
Alando Terrelonge was born in Grants Pen, St Andrew. He graduated from Campion College, attained his law degree from the University of the West Indies, and completed his legal training at the Norman Manley Law School in 2000.

In February 2019 he was appointed Minister of State in the Ministry of Education, Youth and Information. He previously served as Minister of State in the Ministry of Culture, Gender, Entertainment and Sports.
