= Saint Elizabeth South Eastern =

Parliamentary constituency in the Parliament of Jamaica

Saint Elizabeth South East is number 16 on this map.

Saint Elizabeth South Eastern is a parliamentary constituency represented in the Parliament of Jamaica. It elects one Member of Parliament by the first past the post system of election. The constituency covers the south east part of Saint Elizabeth Parish.

== Representation ==
Election	Member	Party
2016	Franklyn Witter	Jamaica Labour Party
