= Dwight Sibblies =

Jamaican politician

MP for Clarendon Northern
- In office 7 September 2020 – 5 September 2025
- Preceded by: Horace Dalley

Personal details
- Party: Jamaica Labour Party

Dwight Sibblies is a Jamaican Labour Party politician who has been Member of Parliament for Clarendon Northern since defeating Horace Dalley in the 2020 general election.
