= Gabriela Morris =

Jamaican politician

Gabriela Morris (born 1996 or 1997 in Montego Bay) is a Jamaican politician from the People's National Party (PNP). In 2020, she was appointed to the Senate of Jamaica becoming the youngest senator in Jamaican history.
