= Raymond Pryce =

Jamaican politician

Raymond Pryce MP

Member of Parliament for Saint Elizabeth North Eastern
- In office 2011–2016

Personal details
- Born: 1977 or 1978 (age 48–49)
- Party: People’s National Party
- Education: St. George's College, Jamaica; University of the West Indies

Raymond Pryce (born 1977 or 1978) is a Jamaican politician from the People’s National Party (PNP) who has been the Member of Parliament for Saint Catherine East Central since 2011.

he previously served as Member of Parliament for Saint Elizabeth North Eastern.
