= Saint Elizabeth South Western =

Parliamentary constituency of Jamaica

Saint Elizabeth South West is number 6 on this map.

Saint Elizabeth South Western is a parliamentary constituency represented in the Parliament of Jamaica. It elects one Member of Parliament by the first past the post system of election. The constituency covers the south west part of Saint Elizabeth Parish.

== Representation ==
Election	Member	Party
2011	Hugh Buchanan	People's National Party
2016	Floyd Green	Jamaica Labour Party
