= Saint Andrew West Rural (Jamaica Parliament constituency) =

Parliamentary constituency of Jamaica

Saint Andrew West Rural is a parliamentary constituency represented in the House of Representatives of the Jamaican Parliament. It elects one Member of Parliament MP by the first past the post system of election.

== Boundaries ==
A Map of all Jamaican parliamentary constituencies and their respective parliamentary results in the latest parliamentary election on 3 September 2021. Saint Andrew West Rural is featured as number 4 and elected JLP canididate Juliet Samantha Cuthbert-Flynn into the 15th Parliament of Jamaica.

The constituency covers the areas of Brandon Hill and Chancery Hall.

== Constituency General Election Results ==
General Election 2025: Saint Andrew West Rural
| Party | Candidate | Votes | % | ±% |
|---|---|---|---|---|
| JLP | Juliet Cuthbert-Flynn | 8,404 | 52.90 | |
| PNP | Joan Gordon-Webley | 7,229 | 45.51 | |
| JPP | George S. Roach | 72 | 0.45 | |
| Total votes | | 15,886 | 100.0 | |
| Turnout | | | 38.09 | |
| JLP hold | | | | |

General Election 2018: Saint Andrew West Rural
| Party | Candidate | Votes | % | ±% |
|---|---|---|---|---|
| New National Party | Delma Thomas | 2,012 | 57.13 | |
| National Democratic Congress | Philip Reginald Alexander | 1.510 | 42.87 | |
| New National Party hold | | | | |
