= Zavia Mayne =

Jamaican politician

The Honourable Zavia Mayne MP

Minister of State in the Ministry of Finance and Public Service
- Incumbent
- Assumed office 22 May 2023
- Preceded by: unknown

Member of the Jamaican Parliament for Saint Ann South Western
- Incumbent
- Assumed office 2016

Personal details
- Born: January 31, 1972 (age 54) St. Ann, Jamaica
- Party: Jamaica Labour Party
- Education: Norman Manley Law School (LLB); University of London (BSc)

Zavia Taze Mayne is a Jamaican Labour Party politician currently serving as Member of Parliament for Saint Ann South Western.

He is currently a state minister in the Ministry of Finance and Public Service in the Cabinet of Jamaica under Prime Minister Andrew Holness.
