= Angela Brown-Burke =

Jamaican politician

Dr. Angela Brown-Burke MP

Member of the Jamaican Parliament for Saint Andrew South Western
- Incumbent
- Assumed office 7 September 2020
- Preceded by: Portia Simpson-Miller

Mayor of Kingston
- In office 2012–2016
- Succeeded by: Delroy Williams

Personal details
- Born: Angela Rosemarie Brown; April 21, 1965 (age 61)
- Party: People's National Party
- Spouse: Paul Burke
- Education: National-Louis University (EdD)

Angela Rosemarie Brown-Burke (born April 26, 1965) is a Jamaican politician with the People's National Party.

== Early life and education ==
Brown-Burke earned a Doctorate of Education from the National-Louis University in Chicago in 2015.

== Career ==
Brown-Burke started her political career as a Corporate Area Councillor of the Kingston and Saint Andrew Corporation. She was elected a vice-president of the People's National Party in 2006 along with Fenton Ferguson, Derrick Kellier, and Peter Phillips, beating out Sharon Hay-Webster, Louis Moyston, and Kern Spencer.

She moved from local to national politics in January 2012 with her appointment as Deputy President of the Senate of Jamaica after Portia Simpson Miller came to power in the December 2011 general election.

After the PNP's victory over the Jamaica Labour Party (JLP) in the March 2012 election, she became mayor of Kingston.

In May 2013, Brown-Burke tweeted denunciations of Television Jamaica's All Angles and CVM TV's Direct for respectively inviting JLP leader Andrew Holness and opposition spokesman on finance and planning Audley Shaw as guests, without including PNP members for balance. She was criticised for her use of the minced oath "What the F", and apologised for her language and deleted the tweet while defending the views she had expressed.

Brown-Burke co-founded Angela's Care Kitchen, which organizes meals for senior citizens.

== Personal life ==
Brown-Burke is married to Paul Burke, a former Region Three Chairman of the PNP who also ran for PNP vice-president in 2004. Brown-Burke moved to the United States in 1986. She naturalised as a United States citizen in 1995, but decided to move back to Jamaica two years later. She renounced U.S. citizenship in January 2012 after she was appointed to the Senate, and received her Certificate of Loss of Nationality one month later.
