= Fitz Jackson =

Jamaican politician

Fitz Jackson MP

MP for Saint Catherine Southern
- Incumbent
- Assumed office 18 July 1994

Personal details
- Party: People's National Party
- Education: University of Wisconsin–Milwaukee; Florida International University

Fitz A. Jackson is a Jamaican politician who has been Member of Parliament for Saint Catherine Southern since a by-election in 1994.

He was Chairman of the People's National Party from 2017 to 2020.
