= Andrew Wheatley =

Jamaican politician

Dr. The Honourable Andrew Wheatley MP PhD

Minister of Science, Technology and Special Projects
- Incumbent
- Assumed office 17 September 2025

Minister of Science, Technology and Mining
- In office 2016–2018

Member of the Jamaican Parliament for Saint Catherine South Central
- Incumbent
- Assumed office 2011

Mayor of Spanish Town
- In office 2005–2012

Personal details
- Born: January 8, 1973 (age 53)
- Party: Jamaica Labour Party
- Education: University of the West Indies (BSc, MSc); Imperial College London (PhD)

Andrew O'Brien Wheatley (born 8 January 1973) is a Jamaican politician from the Labour Party. He is a Deputy General Secretary of the JLP. He resigned as minister after a scandal.

== Early life and education ==
Andrew O’Brien Wheatley (born 8 January 1973) is a Jamaican politician and scientist. He studied at the University of the West Indies (UWI) and holds a PhD. His academic background is in biochemistry and biotechnology.

Before entering politics, Wheatley worked in academia and research. He was associated with the Department of Basic Medical Sciences at the University of the West Indies, where his research interests included plant biochemistry.

== Political career ==
Wheatley is a member of the Jamaica Labour Party (JLP). He served as Mayor of Spanish Town from 2005 to 2012 and became Member of Parliament for Saint Catherine South Central in 2011.

Following the Jamaica Labour Party's victory in the 2016 general election, Wheatley was appointed Minister of Science, Technology and Mining. He later served as Minister of Science, Energy and Technology.

In 2025, Wheatley returned to Cabinet as Minister Without Portfolio in the Office of the Prime Minister with responsibility for Science, Technology and Special Projects.

== Offices ==
- Minister without Portfolio in the Office of the Prime Minister responsible for Science, Technology and Special Projects (2025–Present)
- Minister of Science Technology and Mining which he held from 2016 to July 2018
- Mayor of Spanish Town (2005–12)
- Deputy Mayor of Spanish Town and vice-chair of the council (2003–05)

== Policy initiatives and constituency work ==
During his tenure as Minister of Science, Technology and Mining and later as Minister of Science, Energy and Technology, Wheatley promoted initiatives focused on science, technology, innovation, and energy development. He emphasized the role of research and innovation in Jamaica’s economic development and supported programmes aimed at strengthening the country’s science and technology capacity.

As Minister of Science, Energy and Technology, Wheatley supported renewable energy initiatives and promoted reducing Jamaica’s dependence on petroleum-based fuels. He highlighted the importance of renewable energy development and clean technology programmes, including the Caribbean Climate Innovation Centre GreenTech Accelerator Programme.

Wheatley also supported the use of technology in public services and national development. During his tenure, he promoted the importance of innovation, digital connectivity, and the expansion of technology-related opportunities.

As Member of Parliament for Saint Catherine South Central, Wheatley has highlighted constituency development projects, including efforts related to infrastructure and community development. He has also promoted internet connectivity initiatives in partnership with the Universal Service Fund to support access to technology within communities.

== Controversies ==
=== Petrojam controversy ===
In 2018, Wheatley resigned from Cabinet amid controversy and investigations concerning the operations of Petrojam, Jamaica's state-owned oil refinery. At the time, Wheatley was the minister responsible for energy.

Wheatley denied wrongdoing in relation to the controversy.

=== Integrity Commission investigation ===
In June 2026, the Integrity Commission recommended charges against Wheatley following an investigation into his statutory declarations and financial disclosures. The recommended charges included allegations of illicit enrichment, making false statements in statutory declarations, and failing to provide information requested by the Commission.

Wheatley has maintained his position regarding the allegations, and the matter remains subject to legal proceedings.
