= Natalie Neita =

Jamaican politician

The Honourable Natalie Neita-Garvey MP

Member of the Jamaican Parliament for Saint Catherine North Central
- Incumbent
- Assumed office 2007

Minister of Sport
- In office 2011–2016

Personal details
- Party: People's National Party
- Education: State University of New York

Natalie Neita-Garvey (née Neita) is a Jamaican politician from the People's National Party. She was Minister of Sport in 2015.

== Political career ==
In January 2018 she was charged with assault of a co-worker.
