= Westmoreland Eastern =

Parliamentary constituency in Jamaica

The constituency is number 5 on this map.

Westmoreland Eastern is a parliamentary constituency represented in the House of Representatives of the Jamaican Parliament. It elects one Member of Parliament by the first past the post system of election. The constituency consists of the eastern part of Westmoreland Parish. It is represented by Jamaica Labour Party MP Daniel Lawrence.

In the 1989 general election, the constituency was covered by Westmoreland North Eastern and Westmoreland South Eastern. The two seats were then merged in the 1993 general election.

== Members ==
Its most prominent MP was former Prime Minister P. J. Patterson.

=== Westmoreland North Eastern ===
- Esme Grant (1967 to 1972)
- Jim Thompson (1972 to ?)
- Headly Cunningham (1989 to 1993)

=== Westmoreland South Eastern ===
- P. J. Patterson (by-election of 1970 to 1980)
- Euphemia Williams (1980 to 1989)
- P. J. Patterson (1989 to 1993)

=== Westmoreland Eastern ===
- P. J. Patterson (1993 to 2006)
- Luther Buchanan (People's National Party) (2006 to 2020)
- Daniel Lawrence (2020 to present)
