= Olivia Grange =

Jamaican politician (born 1946)

The Honourable Olivia Grange OJ CD DSE MP

Minister of Culture, Gender, Entertainment and Sport
- Incumbent
- Assumed office 2016
- Prime Minister: Andrew Holness

Minister of State in the Office of the Prime Minister
- In office 1985–1989

Minister of Sports, Youth and Culture
- In office 2007–2011
- Succeeded by: Lisa Hanna

Member of Parliament for Saint Catherine Central
- Incumbent
- Assumed office 1997
- Preceded by: Lisa Hanna

Personal details
- Born: Olivia Atavia Grange; 27 April 1946 (age 80) Down Town Kingston, Kingston, Jamaica
- Party: JLP
- Children: 1 daughter
- Education: Ryerson Polytechnical Institute
- Nickname: 'Babsy'

Olivia Atavia "Babsy" Grange (born 27 April 1946) is a Jamaican politician. She has served as Member of Parliament for Saint Catherine Central since 1997 and as Jamaica's Minister of Sports, Youth and Culture for the duration of the Jamaica Labour Party government from 2007 to 2011 and Minister of Culture, Gender, Entertainment and Sport since 2016.

== Early life ==
Grange was born on 27 April 1946 in Luke Lane, West Kingston, Jamaica. Her father was a shoemaker and her mother was a dressmaker. She attended All Saints Primary, Gainstead High, and Ryerson Polytechnical Institute in Canada.

== Career ==
From 1983 to 1985, Grange served as Government Senator and Parliamentary Secretary for Information and Culture. From 1985 to 1989, she was the Minister of State in the Office of the Prime Minister. Running as a Jamaica Labour Party (JLP) candidate for St. Catherine Central, Grange was elected into parliament in 1997. In 2007, she was appointed as Minister of Information, Youth, Sports & Culture. She is currently the Minister of Culture, Gender, Entertainment and Sport after the JLP was elected to office in 2016. A reggae enthusiast, Grange is also a founding member of the Jamaica Association of Composers, Authors and Publishers (JACAP). She also co-founded Canada's "first black community newspaper", Contrast.

Grange's close ties to her political base in West Kingston drew significant national controversy in March 1992, when she appeared prominently alongside top Jamaica Labour Party leadership at the public funeral of notorious Shower Posse leader Lester Lloyd "Jim Brown" Coke. Given Coke's extensive criminal history and the fact that he died in prison while awaiting extradition to the United States on federal drug and murder charges, the high-profile attendance of political figures like Grange, Edward Seaga, and Bruce Golding sparked intense public scrutiny regarding the intersection of garrison politics and organized crime. Grange was seated directly in the front section reserved for JLP delegates at the Tivoli Gardens Community Centre during the service, which occurred on the same day Coke's son, Mark "Jah T" Coke, was interred.

== 1990 Electronic Surveillance Controversy and Electoral Backlash ==
During her tenure as a prominent Jamaica Labour Party (JLP) Senator and close ally of Party Leader Edward Seaga, Grange became central to a major political crisis known as the "JLP Spy Scandal" in the wake of the party's defeat in the 1989 general election.

The controversy erupted in April 1990 when former JLP Senator Abe Dabdoub presented an intercepted letter and audio recordings to the JLP Central Executive. The evidence showed that a private surveillance and wiretapping operation was being conducted against senior party officials who were critical of Seaga’s leadership style, including Dabdoub, Anthony Abrahams, and JLP Deputy Leader Pearnel Charles. Dabdoub publicly named Grange and George Ramocan as the masterminds who orchestrated the operation, demanding that the party take immediate disciplinary action against them.

On April 18, 1990, Grange issued an official news release defending her actions and admitting that she had physically provided a tape recorder to the operative conducting the surveillance, a JLP supporter named John "Jackie" Bell. Grange asserted that Bell had approached her claiming there was an active internal conspiracy to oust Seaga and leak sensitive party information to the rival People's National Party (PNP). She argued that her actions were a matter of party loyalty and patriotism, stating she did "what any loyal party member would do in probing allegations of conspiracy." Grange noted that after she, Ramocan, and Party Chairman Bruce Golding reviewed the recorded tapes and deemed Bell's information unreliable, the operation was discarded.

Despite her defense, the revelation sparked an intense grassroots backlash within the JLP membership. In May 1990, rebel MP Karl Samuda publicly demanded a formal apology from Grange for attempting to "entrap" senior members of the party. Grange defiantly rejected the demand, stating on the record: "I have no reason and no intention to apologise."

The internal anger culminated during the internal JLP elections on June 17, 1990, at the party's Belmont Road headquarters. Grange’s nomination to serve on the powerful JLP Standing Committee was overwhelmingly rejected by the general membership. Out of approximately 200 voting delegates, Grange suffered a crushing defeat, securing only 21 votes. Her close political allies, George Ramocan and Senator Hugh Hart, were similarly voted down, polling only 20 and 14 votes respectively. While Grange initially attempted to mitigate the public fallout by claiming to The Gleaner that she had refused the nomination rather than lost the ballot, newly appointed Public Relations Chairman Audley Shaw confirmed to the press that her nomination had been formally moved, seconded, and defeated on the floor. Though the scandal temporarily isolated Grange from the party's inner committees, she retained her seat on the Central Executive and eventually rebuilt her political standing within the party.

== Controversies ==
=== Gangster Killings in Vehicles Registered to Grange ===
In July 2004, police seized a Honda Civic after One Order leader Oliver “Bubba” Smith was shot dead along Festival Road; vehicle registration documents showed Olivia “Babsy” Grange and Andrew “Bunman” Hope as co-owners of the car Smith was driving at the time of his killing.

In October 2005, detectives re-questioned Grange following a shooting at Church and Wellington Streets that left Omar Campbell alias “Tickerus” dead; records revealed she was co-owner of the vehicle in which the gang member was killed, prompting further police scrutiny of her ties to constituents under criminal investigation.

=== Dispute with James Robertson ===
- Their rivalry began in 2003 when Grange challenged Robertson for the Jamaica Labour Party’s Area Council Two deputy-leader post; Robertson won amid whispers of “tainted money.”
- A high-stakes rematch slated for November 2014 was abruptly postponed by party brass—officially to avoid internal bitterness and focus on looming national elections—extending their contest into a second decade.

=== 2004 Spanish Town Peace-Tour Backlash ===
In February 2004, during a Peace Management Initiative tour of violence-torn Spanish Town, residents from the neighbouring South Central constituency publicly accused Grange of siding with the powerful “One Order” gang. They charged that her constituency’s gang members were behind recent shootings and extortion, a claim she emphatically denied on the spot.

=== 2006 Post–Peace-Talk Shooting Incident ===
Following a peace dialogue with gang representatives at the parish council offices, Grange’s car was riddled with bullets at Church and Wellington Streets in Spanish Town. The attack underscored both the volatility of local gang politics and the personal risks she faced as mediator and MP.

=== 2022 Culture Yard “Assault” Lawsuit ===
In March 2022, Maroon entertainer Horus “LA” Lewis filed assault charges against Culture Minister Olivia “Babsy” Grange, alleging that during a live social-media interview at Trench Town’s Culture Yard she ordered him removed, dug her fingernails into his left shoulder blade and caused a bruise consistent with blunt‐force trauma—injuries documented in a medical report and prompting police detectives to open an inquiry and re-question the minister.

== Personal life ==
Grange has one daughter and three granddaughters.

== Recognition ==
In 1997, Grange was nominated as Woman of the Year in Jamaica. In June 2009, she was named as the Caribbean Community's first Champion for Culture. In 2015, Grange was awarded the rank of Commander (CD) in the Order of Distinction for her contributions to the country's music scene and cultural development. In her capacity as the Gender Minister of Jamaica, Grange was presented with the annual DUSUSU Awards in 2019 for her contribution to the development of girls affairs in Jamaica, especially tackling the issue of teenage pregnancy. The annual award founded by girl education advocate and film maker Zuriel Oduwole, recognizes the work of a First Lady and a Gender Minister across the 54 African countries and their diaspora. Olivia Grange became the first recipient of the award, outside of the African continent

== See also ==
- Women in the House of Representatives of Jamaica
