= James Robertson (Jamaican politician) =

Jamaican politician

MP for Saint Thomas Western
- Incumbent
- Assumed office 16 October 2002
- Preceded by: unknown

Personal details
- Party: Jamaica Labour Party

James Robertson (born 9 June 1966) is a Jamaican politician from the Labour Party. He served as the minister of mining and energy in Jamaica between March 2009 and May 2011. He has been the MP for Saint Thomas Western since 2002.
