= Mikael Phillips =

Jamaican politician

Mikael Phillips MP

Member of Parliament for Manchester North Western
- Incumbent
- Assumed office 25 February 2016

Personal details
- Party: People's National Party
- Parent: Peter Phillips (father)

Mikael Asher Phillips is a Jamaican politician from the People's National Party.

Following the death of Elizabeth II, Phillips stated his desire that the end of the Queen's reign would hasten Jamaica's transition to a republic.
