= Clarendon Northern =

Jamaican parliamentary constituency

Clarendon Northern is a parliamentary constituency represented in the House of Representatives of the Jamaican Parliament. It elects one Member of Parliament (MP) by the first past the post system of election. It is located in Clarendon Parish. The current MP is Dwight Sibblies.

== Representatives ==
- Horace Dalley (1989 to 2007)
- Laurence Broderick (2007 to 2011
- Horace Dalley (2011 to 2020)
- Dwight Sibblies (JLP) (from 2020)
