= Saint Ann South Western =

Parliamentary constituency of Jamaica

Saint Ann South Western is a parliamentary constituency represented in the House of Representatives of the Jamaican Parliament. It elects one Member of Parliament by the first past the post system of election. The constituency consists of the south-west part of Saint Ann Parish. It is represented by Labour Party MP Zavia Mayne.

== History ==
Saint Ann South Western was created in 1959 as one of 13 new seats that moved the total number of constituencies in Jamaica from 32 to 45.

== Geography ==
South West St Ann is the most rural of the four constituencies in the parish, most of it being located in the region of the Dry Harbour Mountains. The only major town is Alexandria, but other districts in the constituency include Aboukir, Clarksonville, Inverness, Bethany, Watt Town, and Gibraltar.

== Members of Parliament ==
- Gideon Aabuthnott Gallimore (after 1959)
- Ernie Smith (2002 to 2011)
- Zavia Mayne (2016 - present)
