= Saint Catherine Central =

Parliamentary constituency of Jamaica

Saint Catherine Central is a parliamentary constituency represented in the Parliament of Jamaica. It elects one Member of Parliament by the first past the post system of election. The constituency covers the central part of Saint Catherine Parish. It has been represented by Olivia Grange of the Jamaica Labour Party since 1997.
