= Saint Catherine Eastern =

Parliamentary constituency of Jamaica

Saint Catherine Eastern is a parliamentary constituency represented in the Parliament of Jamaica. It elects one Member of Parliament by the first past the post system of election. The constituency covers the eastern part of Saint Catherine Parish. It has been represented by Denise Daley of the PNP since 2012.
