= Saint Catherine Southern =

Parliamentary constituency in Jamaica

Saint Catherine Southern is a parliamentary constituency represented in the Parliament of Jamaica. It elects one Member of Parliament by the first past the post system of election. The constituency covers the southern part of Saint Catherine Parish. It has been represented by Fitz Jackson of the PNP since 1994.
