= Saint Catherine North Central =

Parliamentary constituency of Jamaica

Saint Catherine North Central is a parliamentary constituency represented in the Parliament of Jamaica. It elects one Member of Parliament by the first past the post system of election. The constituency covers the northern central part of Saint Catherine Parish. It has been represented by Natalie Neita-Headley of the PNP since 2007.
