= Anthony Hylton =

Jamaican politician

The Honourable Anthony Hylton CD MP

Member of Parliament for Saint Andrew Western
- Incumbent
- Assumed office 1993

Minister of Foreign Affairs and Foreign Trade
- In office 2006–2007
- Preceded by: Keith Desmond Knight
- Succeeded by: Kenneth Baugh

Minister of Industry, Investment and Commerce
- In office 2012–2016

Personal details
- Born: George Anthony Hylton; April 27, 1957 (age 69)
- Party: People’s National Party
- Education: Morgan State University (BSc); Georgetown University (JD); University of London (LLM)

George Anthony Hylton (born 27 April 1957) is a Jamaican politician who served as Minister of Foreign Affairs from 2006 to 2007.

== Career ==
Hylton was elected member of parliament with the People's National Party for Saint Andrew Western in 1993. He has held other portfolios including Minister of Foreign Trade as well as Mining and Energy.

He oversees one of the most run-down constituencies in the country and is often criticized for the lack of work in what is dubbed as a PNP stronghold.

In 2014, he faced charges of breaching the Parliamentary Integrity of Members Act. As of 2016, he is the opposition spokesperson on industry, investment and commerce.

== Personal life ==
He was educated at Georgetown University Law center and Morgan State University. Hylton's niece is gymnast and Olympics competitor Toni-Ann Williams.
