= Manchester North Eastern (Jamaica Parliament constituency) =

Parliamentary constituency of Jamaica

Manchester North East is number 20 on the map.

Manchester North Eastern is a parliamentary constituency represented in the House of Representatives of the Jamaican Parliament. Located in Manchester Parish, the constituency was created in 1966. It elects one Member of Parliament (MP) by the first past the post system of election. The current MP is Audrey Marks.

== Electoral Divisions ==
Manchester North Eastern consists of three divisions: Christiana, Craighead, and Walderston.

== Members of Parliament ==
Election	Member	Party
1967	William McLaren	Jamaica Labour Party
1976	Leonard Kirby	Jamaica Labour Party
1989	Calvin Lyn	People's National Party
1993	Audley Shaw	Jamaica Labour Party
2025	Audrey Marks	Jamaica Labour Party
