= Denise Daley =

Jamaican politician

Denise Daley MP

MP for Saint Catherine Eastern
- Incumbent
- Assumed office 2011

Personal details
- Party: People's National Party
- Education: St. Catherine High School

Joyce Denise Daley is a Jamaican politician from the People's National Party. She is a member of the shadow cabinet.
