= Saint Catherine East Central =

Parliamentary constituency of Jamaica

Saint Catherine East Central is a parliamentary constituency represented in the Parliament of Jamaica. It elects one Member of Parliament by the first past the post system of election. The constituency covers the eastern central part of Saint Catherine Parish. It has been represented by Alando Terrelonge of the Jamaica Labour Party since 2016.
