= Phillip Paulwell =

Jamaican politician (born 1962)

The Honourable Phillip Paulwell CD MP

Minister of Energy, Mining, Science and Technology
- In office 6 January 2012 – 3 March 2016
- Prime Minister: Portia Simpson-Miller
- Preceded by: Clive Mullings
- Succeeded by: Andrew Wheatley

Member of Parliament for East Kingston and Port Royal
- Incumbent
- Assumed office 18 December 1997
- Preceded by: Marjorie Taylor
- Majority: 6520 (80.6%)

Personal details
- Born: 14 January 1962 (age 64) Morant Bay, Saint Thomas, Jamaica
- Education: Excelsior High School; University of the West Indies; Norman Manley Law School

Phillip Feany Paulwell (born 14 January 1962) is a Jamaican politician. Paulwell is the current Member of Parliament for the constituency of Kingston East and Port Royal and former Minister of Science, Technology, Energy and Mining STEM in the People's National Party administration, which has formed the Government of Jamaica following the party's electoral victory in the December 2011 General Elections.

Paulwell is also the sitting President of the Caribbean Telecommunications Union (CTU) and the Chairman of the PNP's Region 3, a position he has held since 2006.

== Political career ==
An attorney-at-law by profession, Paulwell started his political career in 1995 as a Senator and Minister of State in the Ministry of Industry Investment and Commerce under the then governing PNP administration.

=== Representational politics ===
In the 1997 General Elections he was elected to the House of Representatives as Member of Parliament for the constituency of Kingston East and Port Royal and was appointed to the executive as Minister of Commerce and Technology under the PJ Patterson-led administration. Paulwell again successfully contested the Kingston East and Port Royal constituency in the October 2002 General Elections, and was named Minister of Industry, Commerce and Technology.

Although Paulwell was one of 28 PNP candidates to retain a seat in the House of Representatives in the General Elections of 2007, the Jamaica Labour Party (JLP), with its 32-seat majority, won the elections and formed the government for the first time in 18 years.

In the December 2011 General Elections, the PNP, led by Portia Simpson Miller, won a majority 42 of 62 Parliamentary seats, one of those being the Kingston East and Port Royal seat, which Paulwell won by a landslide, tallying a majority of 8,050 votes to his opponent's 1,530. When the Government was formed on 6 January 2012, Paulwell was named Minister of Energy, Mining, Science and Technology.

=== PNP elections ===
In 2006, Paulwell successfully contested an internal PNP election, for the position of chairman of the party's Region 3, which encompasses electoral constituencies in the country's capital, Kingston and St Andrew.

== Controversies ==
=== OUR and Digicel ===
In April 2001, Paulwell, who was at the time the Jamaican Minister of Industry, Commerce and Technology, instructed the Jamaican Office of Utilities Regulation (OUR ) to refrain from interfering with the rates charged for fixed to mobile (FTM) calls. Paulwell personally intervened in March 2002 by calling the OUR Director General, Winston Hay, telling him that a fourth telecommunications provider was interested in investing in Jamaica, but would only do so if the FTM rates stayed the same. After Hay refused, Paulwell issued a Direction which restricted the role of the OUR in setting the rates and tariffs on interconnection. It was later reported that Paulwell had only demanded the OUR forgo changing the FTM rates following a complaint from Digicel, after the OUR had directed Digicel to alter its fees.

Following a judicial review, it was ruled that Paulwell had no power to issue the Direction to the OUR, and although Digicel successfully appealed at the Supreme Court, that ruling was overturned after the Court of Appeal ruled that Paulwell's Direction fell outside his ministerial authority and was invalid, and the OUR did not have to comply with it. Digicel's last attempt appeal to the Privy Council was also unsuccessful: the Privy Council again ruled that Paulwell's Direction was outside his ministerial powers.

== Diplomatic cables ==
=== Solutrea ===
Paulwell was at the centre of a telecoms scandal in 2007, after he noted that the sale of Jamaica's fourth cellular licence would go to a company known as Solutrea Jamaica Limited. Solutrea was to pay approximately US$7.5million for the licence. However, when it became unclear whether Solutrea had paid in the full sum, it emerged that Paulwell had issued the licence without all the required public agencies agreeing to the sale. It was further uncovered that Minnette Palmer, an advisor to Paulwell, owned a company which was a shareholder of Solutrea.

=== Cuban light bulb scandal ===
According to a US diplomatic cable, Paulwell was at the centre of a scandal after it emerged that the Jamaican government had accrued a bill of more the US$3.95 million for the distribution of some four million energy saving fluorescent light bulbs donated by the Government of Cuba to the people of Jamaica. The matter was turned over to the Jamaican Director of Public Prosecutions and the Fraud Squad following allegations that Paulwell, the then-Minister of Energy, Industry and Commerce, and Kern Spencer, then-Minister of State within the Energy Ministry, awarded lucrative contracts for nationwide distribution of the bulbs to two companies which only recently had been incorporated by personal friend or relatives. A government investigation into the affair absolved Paulwell of any wrongdoing.

=== Cement fiasco ===
In 2006, the Jamaica Labour Party moved to censure Paulwell in Parliament over the defective cement fiasco. The fiasco began when the Caribbean Cement Company (CCC) recalled 500 tonnes of faulty product it had released into the market. Paulwell, at the time the industry and commerce minister, was accused of negligence and gross dereliction of duty, and there were calls from the opposition on him to tender his resignation as Minister. One accusation levelled at Paulwell was that, despite recommendations from the Jamaican Bureau of Standards, he had failed to exercise his Ministerial authority to declare that the production of cement must conform to the Bureau's certification programme. Prior to its privatisation in 2003, the CCC was under a certification programme. He was also accused of providing false information and misleading Parliament. A US cable stated that the fiasco nearly crippled the booming construction industry because of severe shortages.

=== NetServ ===
According to a US cable, in 2001, Paulwell was at the centre of a controversial loan to NetServ, an IT firm which subsequently collapsed. Paulwell approved a J$180 million loan of public funds to NetServ without matching equity and after a due diligence report raised serious questions about the business conduct of the company's principal, Paul Pereira. NetServ received a J$90 million cheque in 2000 to enable it to carry out start-up operations. In February 2001, just before a second payment was due, JAMPRO, the government's investment promotion agency, sent two reports to Paulwell's Ministry and the NIBJ raising concerns about the operations of NetServ and Paul Pereira. However, the Ministry's loan committee still decided to go through with the second payment to the company. Paulwell later admitted that it was an error not to insist that the company put up US$6 million in equity before the National Investment Bank of Jamaica granted it the original loan.
