= Saint Thomas Western =

Parliamentary constituency of Jamaica

Saint Thomas Western is a parliamentary constituency represented in the House of Representatives of the Jamaican Parliament. It covers the western part of Saint Thomas Parish. It has been represented by MP James Robertson since 2002.
