= Saint Andrew Western =

Parliamentary constituency of Jamaica

Saint Andrew West is a parliamentary constituency represented in the House of Representatives of the Jamaican Parliament. It elects one Member of Parliament MP by the first past the post system of election. It is represented by Anthony Hylton of the People's National Party.

== Boundaries ==
Includes the Cyprus Hall, Plantation Heights, Ferry, New Haven, Duhaney Park, Coorville Gardens, Washington Gardens, Callaloo Mews, Riverton, the western parts of Waterhouse, Seaview Gardens and Hunts Bay Lane.

General Election 2007: Saint Andrew West
Party	Candidate	Votes	%	±%
PNP	Anthony Hylton	7,799	60.44	
JLP	Joyce Young	5,105	36.56	
Total votes		12,904	100.0	
Turnout			52.73	
PNP hold				
