= Saint Andrew Eastern =

Parliamentary constituency of Jamaica

Saint Andrew East is a parliamentary constituency represented in the House of Representatives of the Jamaican Parliament. It elects one Member of Parliament MP by the first past the post system of election.

== Boundaries ==
Covers the areas of Mona and Papine.

General Election 2007: Saint Andrew East
Party	Candidate	Votes	%	±%
JLP	St. Aubyn Bartlett	5,958	53.8	
PNP	Trevor Munroe	5,116	46.2	
Total votes		11,074	100.0	
Turnout			61.37	
JLP hold				
