= Saint Catherine South Central =

Parliamentary constituency of Jamaica

Saint Catherine South Central is a parliamentary constituency represented in the Parliament of Jamaica. It elects one Member of Parliament by the first past the post system of election. The constituency covers the southern central part of Saint Catherine Parish. It has been represented by Andrew Wheatley of the Jamaica Labour Party since 2011.
