= Clarendon Central =

Parliamentary constituency of Jamaica

Clarendon Central is a parliamentary constituency represented in the House of Representatives of the Jamaican Parliament. It elects one Member of Parliament (MP) by the first past the post system of election. The constituency is located at the centre of Clarendon Parish and is currently represented by Labour MP Michael Henry, who has served since 1980.
