= Government ministries and agencies of Jamaica =

The ministries of Jamaica are created at the discretion of the prime minister of Jamaica to carry out the functions of government. As of 2016, the prime minister is Andrew Holness. The agencies of Jamaica are created by both parliamentary law and assigned to ministers to oversee. The governance structure consists of ministries with portfolios that have agencies that carry out its functions.

Used to represent all ministries of Jamaica

== Ministries of Jamaica ==
- Ministry of Culture, Gender, Entertainment and Sport
  - Jamaica Cultural Development Commission
  - Women's Centre of Jamaica Foundation
  - Jamaica Anti-Doping Commission
  - The Institute of Jamaica
  - Jamaica National Heritage Trust
  - National Library of Jamaica
  - Sports Development Foundation
- Ministry of Education, Youth and Information
  - National Education Inspectorate
  - Jamaica Teaching Council
  - HEART Trust/NTA
  - Overseas Examinations Commission
  - University Council of Jamaica
  - Nutrition Products Limited
  - Early Childhood Commission
  - Jamaica Library Service
  - National Council on Education
  - Overseas Examinations Commission (OEC)
  - Council of Community Colleges of Jamaica (CCCJ)
  - Jamaican Foundation for Lifelong Learning (JFLL)
  - Jamaica Tertiary Education Commission (J-TEC)
  - National Education Trust (NET)
  - National College for Educational Leadership (NCEL)
  - National Parenting Support Commission (NPSC)
- Ministry of Finance and the Public Service
  - Jamaica Deposit Insurance Cooperation
  - Caymanas Track Limited
  - The Betting Gaming & Lotteries Commission (BGLC)
  - Tax Administration (TAJ)
  - Statistical Institute of Jamaica (SIOJ)
  - Planning Institute of Jamaica (PIOJ)
  - Jamaica Customs Agency (JCA)
  - Bank of Jamaica (BOJ)
  - Accountant General's Department
- Ministry of Foreign Affairs and Foreign Trade
- Ministry of Health and Wellness
  - Pesticides Control Authority
  - National Health Fund
  - Government Chemist
  - National Public Health Lab
  - National Blood Transfusion Service Jamaica
  - National Family Planning Board
  - National Council on Drug Abuse
    - Councils of the Ministry of Health
      - Medical Council of Jamaica
      - Nursing Council of Jamaica
      - Dental Council of Jamaica
      - Pharmacy Council of Jamaica
      - Council of Professions Supplementary to Medicine
- Ministry of Industry, Commerce, Agriculture and Fisheries
  - Anti- Dumping and Subsidies Commission
  - Bureau of Standards
  - Cannabis Licensing Authority
  - Companies Office of Jamaica
  - Consumer Affairs Commission
  - Department of Cooperatives and Friendly Societies
  - Fair Trading Commission
  - Food Storage and Prevention of Infestation Division
  - Jamaica 4-H Clubs
  - Jamaica Agricultural Society
  - Jamaica Business Development Corporation
  - Jamaica Intellectual Property Office
  - Jamaica National Agency for Accreditation (JANAAC)
  - Micro Investment Development Agency
  - National Compliance & Regulatory Authority
  - Office of the Government Trustee
  - Rural Agricultural Development Authority
  - SCJ Holdings Limited
  - Sugar Industry Authority
  - The Banana Board
  - Trade Board Limited
- Ministry of Justice
  - Dispute Resolution Foundation
  - Legal Aid Clinic
- Ministry of Labour and Social Security
- Ministry of Local Government and Community Development
  - National Solid Waste Management Authority (NSWMA)
  - Jamaica Fire Brigade
- Ministry of National Security
  - Jamaica Constabulary Force
  - Jamaica Defence Force
  - Passport, Immigration & Citizenship Agency
  - The Department of Correctional Services
  - Private Security Regulation Authority
  - Firearm Licensing Authority
  - Caribbean Regional Drug Law Enforcement Training Centre
  - Major Organized Crime and Anti-Corruption Agency
  - Private Security Regulation Authority
  - Jamaica Combined Cadet Force
- Ministry of Science, Energy and Technology
  - The Earthquake Unit
  - Clarendon Alumina Production
  - The International Centre for Environmental & Nuclear Sciences
  - Jamaica Bauxite Institute
  - National Commission on Science and Technology
  - Scientific Research Council
  - e-Learning Jamaica
  - Postal Corporation of Jamaica
  - Spectrum Management Authority Limited
  - Universal Service Fund
  - eGOV Jamaica Limited
  - Petrojam Ethanol Limited
  - Government Electrical Inspectorate
  - Petroleum Corporation of Jamaica
  - Petrojam Limited
  - Rural Electrification Programme (REP)
  - Wigton Windfarm
  - Board of Examiners
- Ministry of Tourism
  - Tourism Enhancement Fund
  - Tourism Product Development Company
  - Jamaica Tourist Board
  - Jamaica Vacation Limited
  - Devon House Development Company
  - Milk River Hotel and Spa
  - Bath Foundation Hotel and Spa
- Ministry of Transport and Mining
  - Port Security Corps
  - Caribbean Maritime Institute
  - Maritime Authority of Jamaica
  - Airports Authority of Jamaica
  - Jamaica Civil Aviation Authority
  - Aeronautical Telecommunications Ltd.
  - Jamaica Urban Transit Company
  - Transport Authority
  - Jamaica Railway Corporation
  - Functions of The Corporation:
  - Montego Bay Metro
  - Jamaica Ultimate Tyre Company
  - The MGD
- Ministry of Economic Growth and Job Creation
  - Agro Investment Corporation
  - Beach Control Authority
  - Commission of Strata Corporations
  - Development Bank of Jamaica
  - Factories Corporation of Jamaica (FCJ)
  - Forestry Department
  - Harmonization Limited
  - Housing Agency of Jamaica (HAJ)
  - IMF Coordination Unit
  - Jamaica Business Development Centre (JBDC)
  - Jamaica International Financial Services Authority
  - Jamaica Mortgage Bank (JMB)
  - JAMPRO
  - Kingston Container Terminal
  - Kingston Free Zone
  - Land Administration and Management Programme (LAMP)
  - Land Development and Utilization Commission
  - Land Divestment Advisory Committee
  - Meteorological Department
  - Micro Investment Development Agency (MIDA)
  - Montego Free Zone
  - National Environment and Planning Agency (NEPA)
  - National Export-Import Bank of Jamaica (EXIM Bank)
  - National Housing Trust (NHT)
  - National Land Agency (NLA)
  - National Road Operating & Constructing Company (NROCC)
  - National Spatial Data Management Unit
  - National Water Commission (NWC)
  - National Works Agency (NWA)
  - Planning Institute of Jamaica (PIOJ)
  - Port Authority Management Services
  - Port Authority of Jamaica (PAJ)
  - Real Estate Board
  - Relocation of Human Settlements
  - Rent Assessment Board
  - Road Maintenance Fund (RMF)
  - Rural Water Supply Company
  - Self-Start Fund
  - Statistical Institute of Jamaica (STATIN)
  - Toll Authority
  - Toll Regulator
  - Urban Development Corporation (UDC)
  - Water Resource Authority (WRA)
  - Land, Environment and Climate Change
    - Beach Control Authority
    - Forestry Department
    - Land Administration and Management Programme (LAMP)
    - Land Development and Utilisation Commission
    - Land Divestment Advisory Committee
    - Meteorological Department
    - National Environment and Planning Agency (NEPA)
    - National Land Agency (NLA)
    - National Spatial Data Management Unit
  - Housing
    - Commission of Strata Corporations
    - Housing Agency of Jamaica (HAJ)
    - Jamaica Mortgage Bank (JMB)
    - Real Estate Board
    - Relocation of Human Settlements
    - Rent Assessment Board
  - Water
    - National Water Commission (NWC)
    - Rural Water Supply Company
    - Water Resource Authority (WRA)
  - Works
    - National Road Operating & Constructing Company (NROCC)
    - National Works Agency (NWA)
    - Road Maintenance Fund (RMF)
    - Toll Authority
    - Toll Regulator

== Agencies of Jamaica ==
- Access to Information Unit
- Constituency Development Fund
- Culture, Health, Arts, Sports & Education (CHASE)
- Electoral Commission of Jamaica (ECJ)
- Integrity Commission
- Jamaica Defence Force
- Jamaica Information Service (JIS)
- Jamaica Social Investment Fund (JSIF)
