= 2016 Jamaican general election =

- 25 February 2016

All 63 seats in the House of Representatives 32 seats needed for a majority
- Turnout: 48.4% (▼4.8 pp)
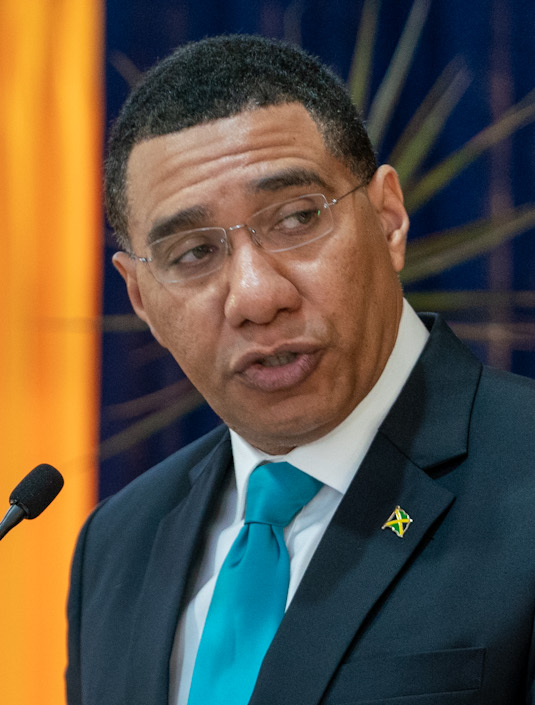

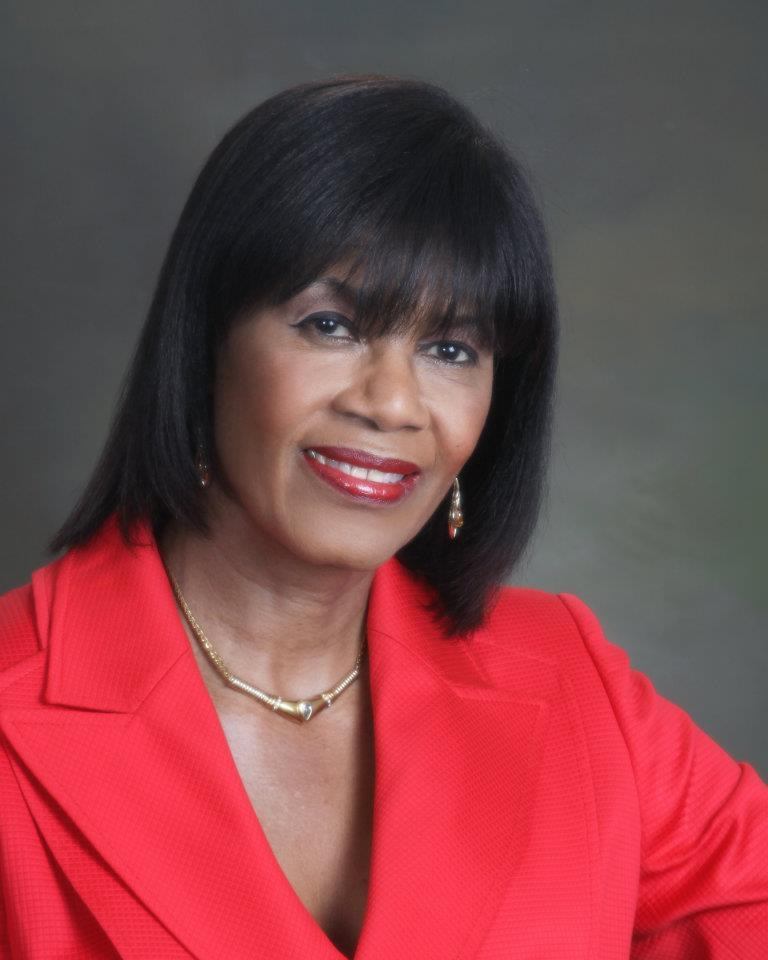
	First party	Second party
Leader	Andrew Holness	Portia Simpson-Miller
Party	JLP	PNP
Last election	46.6%, 21 seats	53.4%, 42 seats
Seats won	32	31
Seat change	▲11	▼11
Popular vote	437,178	433,629
Percentage	50.1%	49.7%
Swing	▲3.5pp	▼3.7pp
- Results by constituency
Prime Minister before election
Portia Simpson-Miller
PNP
Prime Minister after election
Andrew Holness
JLP

General elections were held in Jamaica on 25 February 2016. The elections were largely a contest between the governing People's National Party (PNP) and the opposition Jamaica Labour Party (JLP). The result was a narrow victory for the JLP, which won 32 of the 63 seats. One political commentator described the poll as "the closest election Jamaica has ever had".

The JLP's share of the vote was the lowest for a winning party since 1962, when the JLP won 50.1% of the vote, and its resulting majority in the House of Representatives was the narrowest since the 1949 elections. A similarly close election occurred in 2007, in which two seats changed hands on recounts.

== Background ==
Prime Minister Portia Simpson-Miller announced the date of the general election on 31 January 2016. The nomination date of 9 February 2016 was also announced. The election can be considered as having been called early, as it was constitutionally due between 29 December 2016 (the date in 2011 of the previous general election) and 16 April 2017 (within five years and three months of the date in 2012 of the first sitting of the new Parliament, on 17 January). There is no fixed election date in effect in Jamaica at this time; hence, the choice of election date is the prerogative of the Prime Minister.

== Electoral system ==
The 63 members of the House of Representatives are elected in single-member constituencies by first-past-the-post voting. The Representation of the People Act permits the candidacy of voters above the age of 21. Any Commonwealth citizen residing in Jamaica can vote in the election if they are older than 18 years. To be included on the ballot, a nomination must include the signatures of at least ten eligible voters from the same constituency. The nomination form must then be submitted during a four-hour period on nomination day.

== Campaign ==
A total of 152 candidates registered to contest the elections, with both the Jamaica Labour Party (JLP) and the People's National Party (PNP) nominating a candidate in every constituency. Minor parties put forward a small number of candidates, with seven from the National Democratic Movement, six from the Marcus Garvey People's Progressive Party and two from the People's Progressive Party.

== Results ==
Preliminary results saw the opposition JLP gaining a total of twelve seats, taking a slender three-seat majority over the governing PNP in the House of Representatives. No other parties were elected. Among those elected were Robert Montague, Chairman of the JLP, and Juliet Holness. The voter turnout of 47.7% was the lowest since 1983, the year when the PNP boycotted the election. JLP leader Andrew Holness became Prime Minister-designate, regaining the position he lost to Simpson-Miller after the previous election in 2011.

Subsequently, however, a recount in the St. Mary South Eastern constituency led to a 127-vote margin in favour of the JLP being overturned and the result being called for the PNP by 9 votes, narrowing the margin in the House to 32–31. The recount in St. Mary South East had also called into question results in St. Ann South West, St. James South, St. Catherine North Eastern, and St. Andrew Eastern, which were decided by similarly narrow margins.

After recounts, the JLP was declared to have 32 seats to the PNP's 31, a bare majority of one. The JLP planned to contest the St. Mary South East recount that saw its margin narrow. The final count, as authorised by the Electoral Commission, was announced on 2 March.

A similarly close election occurred in 2007, in which two seats changed hands on recounts.

Party	Votes	%	Seats	+/–
Jamaica Labour Party	436,972	50.08	32	+11
People's National Party	433,735	49.71	31	–11
Marcus Garvey People's Political Party	260	0.03	0	0
National Democratic Movement	223	0.03	0	0
People's Progressive Party	91	0.01	0	New
Independents	1,233	0.14	0	0
Total	872,514	100.00	63	0
Valid votes	872,514	98.88		
Invalid/blank votes	9,875	1.12		
Total votes	882,389	100.00		
Registered voters/turnout	1,824,412	48.37		
Source: Electoral Commission of Jamaica, The Gleaner

== Aftermath ==
The new parliament was convened on 10 March 2016, meaning that constitutionally the next general elections will be due between 25 February 2021 (five years after the date of this election) and 10 June 2021 (within five years and three months of the date of the first sitting of the new Parliament), unless elections are called earlier by the Prime Minister.

A by-election in St. Mary South-East was held on 30 October 2017 following the death of PNP incumbent Winston Green. The seat was won by Norman Dunn of the JLP, giving them a three-seat majority in parliament.
