= Adlyn White =

Jamaican educator and Christian minister (1929–2017)

The Reverend Dr Adlyn White
- Born: 1929; Jamaica
- Died: 24 January 2017 (aged 87); Jamaica
- Education: University of the West Indies; St. John's University; United Theological College of the West Indies
- Known for: First woman ordained by the United Church in Jamaica and the Cayman Islands

Adlyn White (1929 – 24 January 2017) was a Jamaican educator and Christian minister who was the first woman to be ordained by the United Church in Jamaica and the Cayman Islands. She was also the first woman to head the church, serving as its moderator of synod from 1991 to 1993.

== Biography ==
White held degrees from the University of the West Indies and St. John's University, New York, including a Ph.D. in educational administration. She originally worked as a schoolteacher, teaching English, Latin, and religious education at the Morris Knibb Preparatory School in Kingston. She later taught at Public School 118 in Queens, New York, for a brief period. White received her theological training at the United Theological College of the West Indies, and in 1959 became a deaconess in the Presbyterian Church in Jamaica; her denomination merged into the new United Church in 1965. In 1969, she became a lecturer at the Church Teachers' College in Mandeville.

White was ordained as a minister in June 1973, the first woman to fill that role in the United Church. She served as the church's Director of Women's Work, and was eventually made vice-principal of the teachers' college. She was acting principal on two occasions (1987–1988 and 1990–1991), and retired in 1995. White was elected moderator of the synod in 1991 and served until 1993, the first woman to head the church. She was simultaneously president of the Institute for Theological and Leadership Development, the predecessor of the International University of the Caribbean. White also served on the board of Knox College, as a member of the University Council of Jamaica, and as an adviser to the Ministry of Education.

== Death ==
White died from complications of a brain tumour in January 2017, aged 87.
