= Kingston University (disambiguation) =

Kingston University is a university in South West London, England.

Kingston University may refer to:

- Queen's University at Kingston, Ontario, Canada
- Several universities with campuses in Kingston, Jamaica:
  - International University of the Caribbean
  - Northern Caribbean University
  - University of Technology, Jamaica
  - University of the Commonwealth Caribbean
