= Education in Jamaica =

Ministry of Education, Youth and Culture

General details
- Primary languages: English

Literacy (2022)
- Total: 96%
- Male: 94.1%
- Female: 98.4%
- Primary: 99% (80% attendance rate)

Education in Jamaica is primarily modeled on the British education system.

The Human Rights Measurement Initiative (HRMI) finds that Jamaica is fulfilling only 70.0% of what it should be fulfilling for the right to education based on the country's level of income. HRMI breaks down the right to education by looking at the rights to both primary education and secondary education. While taking into consideration Jamaica's income level, the nation is achieving only 62.8% of what should be possible based on its resources (income) for primary education and 77.2% for secondary education.

== Early childhood education and big schools all around the country ==
Early childhood education includes the basic, infant and privately operated pre-schools. The age cohort is usually 1 – 6 years. The Government of Jamaica began its support for the development of early childhood education, care and development in 1942. There are 2,595 early childhood institutions. Of these, 183 are not recognized by the government, 401 are day care centers, approximately 100 are infant schools and five are special education schools which offer early childhood care. The enrollment rate between 4 and 6 years is 62% - one of the highest rates in the region.

== Primary education ==
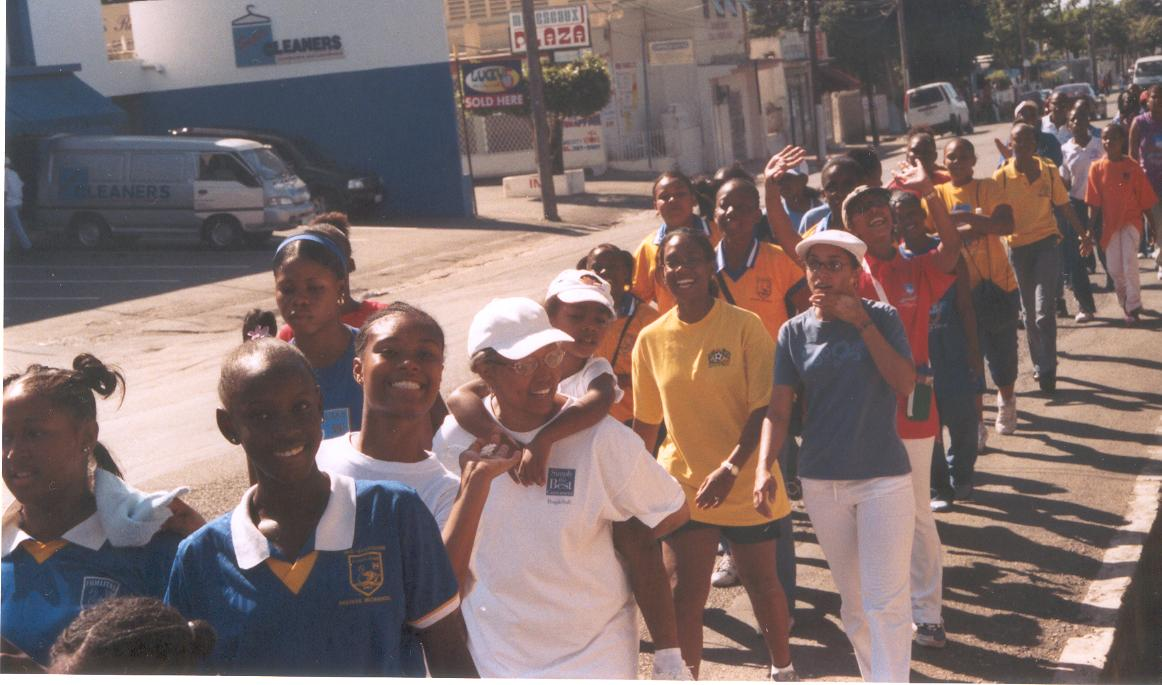
Walk to celebrate the 105th anniversary of St. Hugh's High School for Girls, January 2004

Primary education in Jamaica addresses the basic educational needs of students and prepares them for secondary education. It includes children between the ages of 5 and 12 years. Under the Caribbean Examination Council's Revised Primary Curriculum, student assessment has changed significantly from the former Common Entrance Examination at the end of Grade 6. Since 1999, the National Assessment Program (NAP) has been utilizing a variety of teaching strategies to ensure that learning experiences are more broad based and student centered. NAP adopts an integrated approach from grades 1-3 and a discrete subject area for grades 4-6. For many years, Jamaica has achieved universal primary education.

- Grade 1: Readiness Inventory
- Grade 3: Assessment tests in Math and Language Arts
- Grade 4-6: PEP (Primary Exit Profile) is completed annually for grades 4, 5 and 6 which is the main contributing factor as to the high school you go to. It has subjects: Mental Ability, Mathematics, Language arts, Etc. Students usually take on extra classes provided by the school in order to get the best grade you can on these exams. PEP is the exam replacing the previously used GSAT (Grade Six Achievement Test).

The six years of primary school education in Jamaica is compulsory and comes with many costs associated with it. Children receive their instruction in English, and remain there between the ages of 6 and 12. Schools may be state-owned, or private preparatory schools. Many students tend to enter primary schools already being able to read, as they would have been taught to do so in basic schools (kindergartens, daycare centers etc.)

Students tend to do a variety of subjects at the primary school level including religious studies, art and craft, Spanish, physical education and computer studies, though Spanish and computer studies are not the norm in most schools. When students get to Grade 4, much emphasis and focus is placed on the subjects they will do at the end of Grade 6 (PEP).

In most primary schools, one class teacher usually teaches students all the subjects. According to a UNESCO document entitled "Education for all 2015 National Review Report: Jamaica", "some 96 per cent of the teachers at this level are professionally trained with female [teachers] accounting for 88 per cent of the staff complement. Most students transition from primary to secondary level education." Between grades 1 and 3 students do between six and ten subjects depending on the schools. Between grades 4 and 6, most students will focus on five subjects, though after their Grade Six Achievement Exams in March each year, schools sometimes use the remaining school year to do other subjects like Art and Music. While the lecture method is used in some classes at some schools, most primary school teachers think students are too young for them to be taught by this method and instead opt to use more interactive approaches. Students are taught from early on to work in groups and teachers encourage students to commit and memorize much information. It is very common for primary school students in Jamaica to be required to recite on a daily basis, various poems, tables of multiplication (generally up to 12), tables of synonyms and even mnemonics. Visual aids are used a lot to help in the teaching and learning process and it is very common to see the walls of primary school classrooms decorated with charts made by teachers or those bought in stores, that contain information that students need to know.

The primary school system in Jamaica is quite rigorous as students are assigned a lot of homework daily from as early as Grade 1 (age 5 or 6). Most students have at least two hours of homework to do each day and up to eight hours of homework on weekends. It is not uncommon for students to be punished by their teachers when homework assignments are not completed. In many instances the parents are called when the assignments are not done. Students are tested regularly and generally ranked in their classes by the grades that they receive. Students are required to do three national exams in primary schools so much pressure is placed on parents, the students, the teachers and the schools.

Primary Exit Profile (PEP)

Much like the GSAT, In the first term of their Grade 6 year, students make a prioritized list of seven high schools they wish to attend, in the order of which they would like to go (if the qualification are met, the school placed at number one is where you will go and if not, then you go to the second choice, etc.) Based on the results from the GSAT, they are placed at a school from their list. Some schools have a higher cutoff score, generally schools with a history of high academic performance such as York Castle High School or Jamaica College. To get into the top ranked high schools in Jamaica, students need to generally score as high as possible ( usually over 90%) in their PEP examinations. Almost all parents want their children to go these schools. As a result, much pressure is placed on the students to excel. They must do many hours of extra lessons each day after school. Some extra classes last up to five hours a day. Most students also have to go to classes on weekends. Many children in Grade 6 across the country do have little free time as they usually have many assignments to complete for their regular school classes as well as for the extra classes. Many parents spend thousands of dollars to get students enrolled in highly competitive extra classes with teachers who are known for getting students to excel and being placed at the top traditional high schools. It is not uncommon for many students to be stressed at this point of their academic lives, as the number of assignments they receive is often overwhelming. Students tend to have great support at school from their teachers, as some schools tend to have some of their best teachers with years of experience preparing students for these exams.

At most schools students are usually given mock exams to test their readiness. Teachers tend to use past PEP papers to test the students.

Grade Six Achievement Test (GSAT) (Outdated and no longer used)

In the first term of their Grade 6 year, students make a prioritized list of five high schools they wish to attend, and based on the results from the GSAT, they are placed at a school from their list. Some schools have a higher cutoff score, generally schools with a history of high academic performance. To get into the top ranked high schools in Jamaica, students need to generally score As (over 80%) in their GSAT examinations. Almost all parents want their children to go these schools. As a result, much pressure is placed on the students to excel. They must do many hours of extra lessons each day after school. Some extra classes last up to five hours a day. Most students also have to go to classes on weekends. Many children in Grade 6 across the country do have little free time as they usually have many assignments to complete for their regular school classes as well as for the extra classes. Many parents spend thousands of dollars to get students enrolled in highly competitive extra classes with teachers who are known for getting students to excel and being placed at the top traditional high schools. It is not uncommon for many students to be stressed at this point of their academic lives, as the number of assignments they receive is often overwhelming. Students tend to have great support at school from their teachers, as some schools tend to have some of their best teachers with years of experience preparing students for these exams.

At most schools students are usually given mock exams to test their readiness. Teachers tend to use past GSAT papers to test the students. Usually reports are given to the parents after these exams with teacher-parent consultations on how to get the students to improve if that is the case.

GSAT takes place in March each year. Students are given five exams over a two-day period (two exams on one day and three exams on the other). Students are tested on:

- Social Studies (including Civics, Geography and History)
- Language Arts
- Mathematics
- Science
- Communication Tasks

Social Studies, Language Arts, Mathematics and Science usually take the form of multiple choice whereas Communication Tasks usually requires students to write stories, letters, fill out forms, or make recommendations.

The GSAT examination is a national examination that is administered by the Ministry of Education (MOE). Students cannot move on to public high schools without having sat these exams. The MOE prepares these exams, sends trained persons into the schools to administer these exams and is in charge of marking the exams. School teachers do not get to see the exam until after the exam is completed, and do not get to mark their students' scripts. To ensure transparency, efficiency and fairness, the government uses computers to mark the multiple choice scripts and specially trained individuals from University (lecturers), high schools (teachers) and so on to mark the communication task exams. After the examinations are marked, the grades are registered in computers. Based on students' scores, the high schools they selected and where they reside, the computer places them.

Each June, primary schools get the results of the examinations. The public is generally made aware of the release date of the exams and many parents would visit the schools to collect the results of the students. The paper with the results usually has the scores the students get for each subject, their overall average and the high school at which they have been placed. Usually the media descends on some schools to capture the reaction of the students as their results are being read by the teachers.

The Minister of Education holds a press conference to discuss the results of the examinations, and often explains what subjects have recorded a better performance than the previous year and which ones have declined. A comparison is often made between the performance of boys and girls and the top performing students highlighted. Congratulatory notes and messages from schools and parents are usually placed in the local newspaper to identify individual students who have done well.

Issues with the GSAT

When the GSAT came into effect in 1999, many people praised it for its inclusiveness. It ushered a new era in primary and secondary education in Jamaica. Unlike the previous Common Entrance Examination, the GSAT places almost all primary school students who sit the exams into a secondary institution or a junior high school. No sooner had the students started to prepare for the exams than it started to receive criticisms and these criticisms have increased over the years. The main criticism of the exams is that the students are required to know much information and often, information that some believe they should be learning at the high school level. The exams have gained fame for being rigorous and requiring students to know an overwhelming wealth of information. Also, students are stressed to prepare for these exams and that it is difficult to determine students' true abilities on these one-shot exams because many suffer from anxiety over these exams. Some also say it is unfair to prepare students for the exams for two to three years and because they do not necessarily do well (for whatever reason such as illness or family issues), they cannot be placed at a school of choice. Therefore, these people have called for a more continuous assessment method to be used to determine students' success on these exams. Some critics have also argued that in many instances, students who get good grades (usually considered averages of 80% and over) are not placed at traditional high schools that they selected. In addition, many education specialists in the country have also said that many students suffer from emotional and physical exhaustion so much so that when they get into a high school they fail to maintain the grades they received in the GSAT exams. Some argue that many of these 12-year-old students simply want a break from the high demands of the education system in Jamaica. Another criticism of the exam is that it places top students at particular "Jamaican Ivy League" high schools, and students who do not do well go to other high schools. Many have argued for a balance of students to be placed at all schools so as to remove the negative stigmas attached to certain schools.

In 2018, the Primary Exit Profile (PEP) replaced both the Grade 4 Literacy and Numeracy Test and the Grade Six Achievement Test.

== Secondary education ==
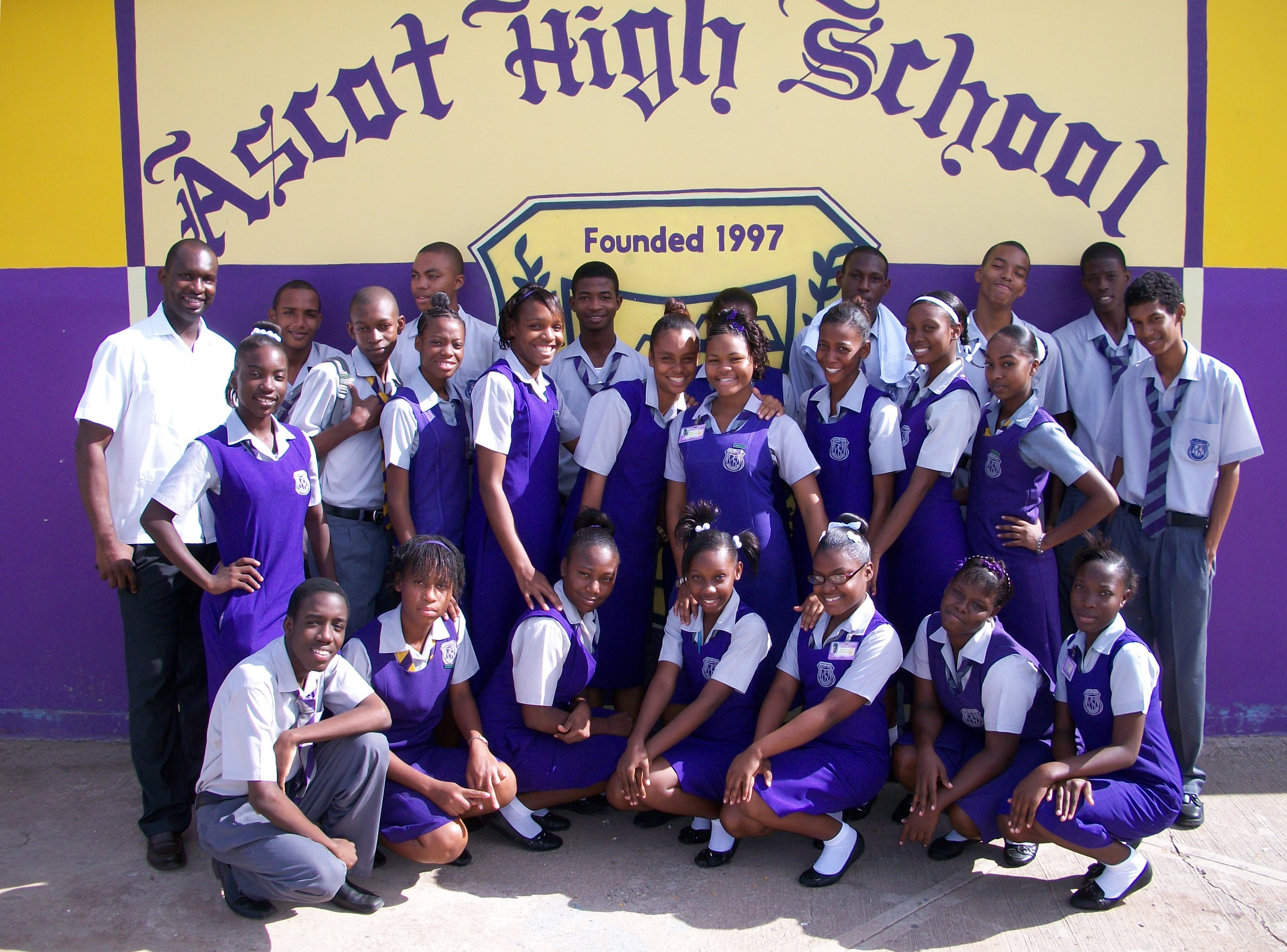
11th grade Ascot High School students with their teacher, Gamberdolan, 2010

- Lower School - Forms 1-3 (Generally ages 13 – 15) or grades 7-9

Students are exposed to a wide range of subjects, including Spanish and French as 2nd languages. Generally, Integrated Science is generally taught until the 3rd form, where students begin taking Physics, Biology and Chemistry as separate subjects. Some schools group students based on their academic achievement in the year prior. This can impact what subjects some students might be able to take later on in school, and what teachers they might be assigned to.

- Upper School - Forms 4 & 5 or grades 10-11

In 4th form, students choose anywhere from 6-11 subjects (8 is the standard) that they will sit in the Caribbean Examination Council's (CXC) school leaving examinations (Caribbean Secondary Education Certificate). These exams are similar to the GCSE exams in the UK. Students are free to create their own curricula which must include but cannot be limited to: Mathematics and English Language. All others are optional, though some schools tend to make at least 1 other compulsory. Most students take at least one foreign language. The Council now offers 33 subjects including but not limited to: History, Geography, English Literature, Agricultural Science, Biology, Physics, Chemistry, Additional Mathematics, Spanish, French, Principles of Accounts, Principles of Business, Information Technology, Religious Education, Technical Drawing, Music, Visual Arts and Theater Arts. Generally, students are informally classified, or classify themselves as Arts, Sciences, Industrial Arts and Business students, especially if they plan on going to 6th form.

Grading: Some exams can be taken at either the Technical (5) or General Proficiency (28) levels. Exams are graded from Grades I to VI (up to VII, if CAPE - see below). For CSEC, I represents an outstanding performance; II is a good standard of performance; III is a fairly good standard of performance. IV and below are generally considered as failure as only Grades I through III are recognized as a pass for matriculation into tertiary institutions or entry into the work force.

- Sixth Form - divided into upper and lower sixth, or grades 12 (lower) and 13 (upper)

Sixth form is an optional, two years long, advanced post secondary program, at the end of which students write the CAPE (Caribbean Advanced Proficiency Exams). These are the equivalent of the GCE A-Level examinations which were the standard up until 2003. Some students still choose to sit A-levels if they wish, but in doing so they must still meet CAPE's basic subject requirements/groupings. CAPE and A-level exams are significantly harder than exams sat at the end of high school, and are often thought to be harder than most exams students will ever sit in university.

== Tertiary education ==
Generally, A-Levels or CAPE examinations are required to enter the nation's universities. One may also qualify after having earned a 3-year diploma from an accredited post-secondary college. The word college usually denotes institutions which do not grant at least a bachelor's degree. Universities are typically the only degree granting institutions; however, many colleges have been creating joint programs with universities, and thus are able to offer some students more than a college diploma.

A few universities in the United States have extension programs in various parts of Jamaica. Most of the students who enroll in these part-time programs are working professionals who want to continue their education without having to relocate closer to the nation's universities. \ Tertiary education is offered by the following institutions:

- Caribbean Maritime University (CMU)
- University of the West Indies at Mona (a regional institution)
- University of Technology (UTech, Ja.)
- Excelsior Community College (EXED)
- Northern Caribbean University (NCU)
- International University of the Caribbean (IUC)
- University of the Commonwealth Caribbean (UCC)
- Edna Manley College of the Visual and Performing Arts (an artistic conservatory)
- College of Agriculture, Science and Education (CASE)
- G. C. Foster College of Physical Education and Sports
- Knox Community College
- Moneague College
- All American Institute of Medical Sciences, Black River, St. Elizabeth (AAIMS)
- Teacher training colleges
  - The Mico University' College, Cross Roads, Kingston
  - Shortwood Teachers' College, Shortwood, St. Andrew
  - Bethlehem Teachers' College, Malvern, St. Elizabeth
  - Moneague College, Moneague, St. Ann
  - Church Teachers' College, Mandeville, Manchester
  - Sam Sharpe Teachers' College, Montego Bay, St. James
  - St. Joseph's Teacher's College, St. Andrew
  - Catholic College of Mandeville, Mandeville, Manchester
  - Saint John's College (School of Nursing)
- 14 community colleges
- 1 dental auxiliary school
- 1 vocational training development institute
- 29 vocational training centres, and
- 6 human employment and resources training (HEART) vocational training institutions.

== Special programs and events ==
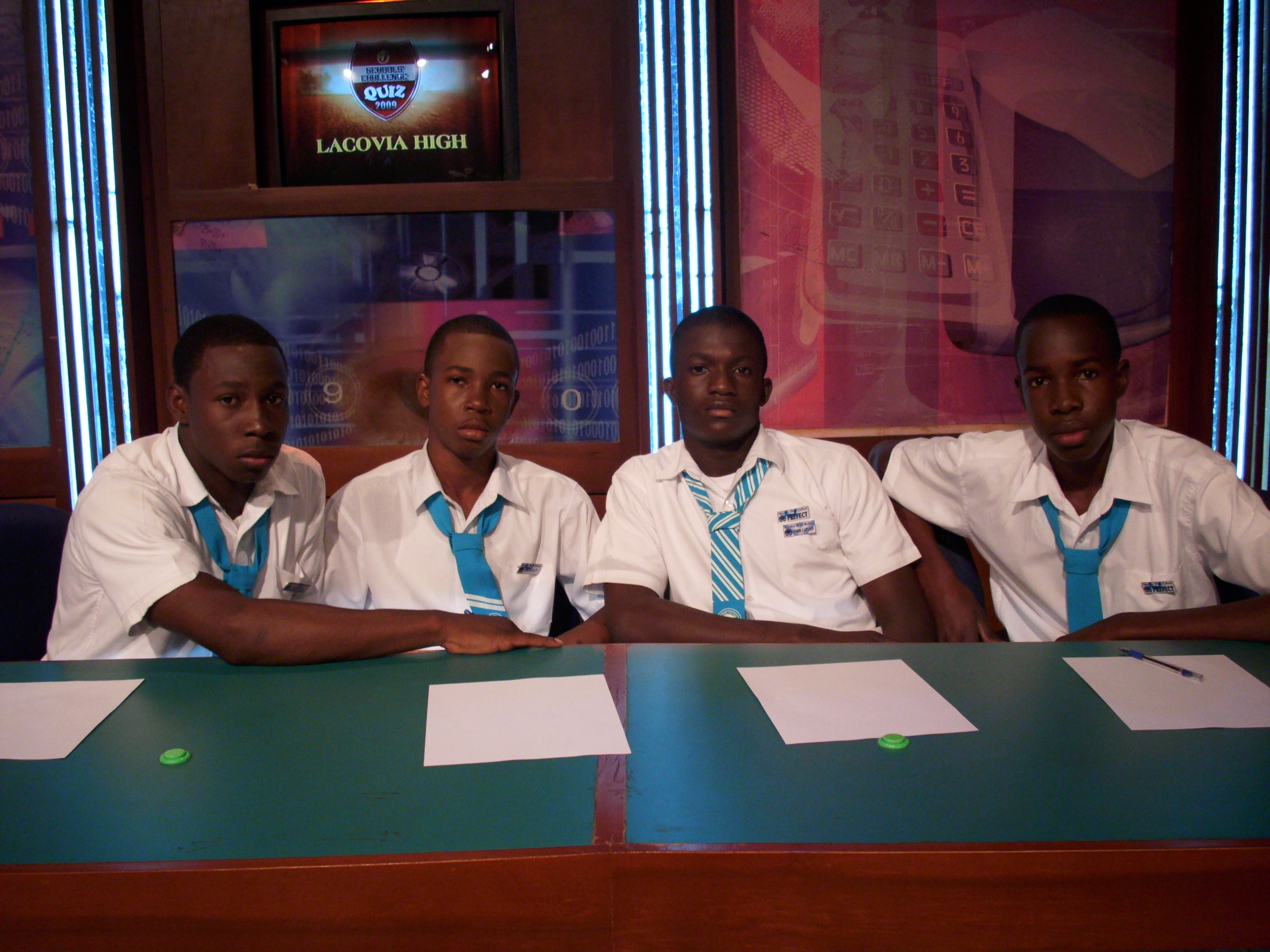
2008-2009 Lacovia High School's quiz team

=== Tourism education program ===
The Jamaica Tourist Bsm is a new subject at all levels from early childhood up to secondary, that is for children from age 4 to 20 years". This program, introduced for the 1999/2000 academic year, works in accordance with the set curriculum, which includes "Mathematics, Social Studies, Resource and Technology which will carry tourism related materials and concepts".

The tourism education program has also led the Ministry of Education to edit some of the textbooks to be used in schools, with other texts being developed. With the preparation of the new textbooks comes the training of tourism teachers, with an understanding of "Who is a Tourist, Why People Travel, the Importance of Tourism, Anti Harassment and Culture". Jamaica has also formed a summer school program, which is a five-day workshop for students to gain first hand experience working in the tourism environment.

Field trips to "local" tourist attractions are also included, along with a "one month placement of the top students in hotels and tourism related organizations. Each of the schools selected to participate in this program was invited to send five students from the third and fourth form years". The group of students selected is accompanied by a teacher and covers the following material: Tourism is our Business; Attitudinal Development; In the Tourist’s shoes; Tourism and the Environment; and Trends in the Industry.

=== Special events ===
Schools compete scholastically in School's Challenge Quiz and debating competitions.

In regard to sports, the main track and field event is the Boys and Girls School's Championships. For football there are the Manning Cup and DaCosta Cup competitions. For cricket there is the Grace Shield competition. Many swim meets are held throughout the year.

== See also ==
- List of universities and colleges in Jamaica
