= List of universities and colleges in Jamaica =

This is a list of universities in Jamaica. The University Council of Jamaica (UCJ), established by an Act of Parliament in 1987, is the national quality assurance body for tertiary education in Jamaica. It is a statutory body under the portfolio of the Minister of Education.

== Universities ==
Name	Location	Founded	Accreditation status
Caribbean Maritime University	Palisadoes	1980, as Jamaica Maritime Training Institute	Local university with accredited programmes
Northern Caribbean University	Mandeville	1907, as West Indian Training School	Accredited institution
The Mico University College	Kingston	1835, as The Mico Normal School	Accredited institution
University of Technology, Jamaica	Kingston	1958, as Jamaica Institute of Technology	Accredited institution
University of the Commonwealth Caribbean	Kingston	2004	Accredited institution
University of the West Indies, Mona Campus	Mona	1948, as University College of the West Indies	Accredited institution

== Local colleges, institutes, and training units ==
The following is a list of all "local colleges, institute, and training units" which offer programmes accredited by the UCJ.

Name	Location	Founded	Accredited subject areas
All American Institute for Medical Science	Black River	2009	Health sciences
B&B University College	Kingston	1984 as B&B Institute of Business	Business and tourism
Bethel Bible College of the Caribbean - Jamaica	Mandeville	1944 as Evangelical Institute	Theology
Bethlehem Moravian College	Malvern	1861 as Moravian Training College for Women	Business and tourism
Brown's Town Community College	Brown's Town	1975	Business, tourism, social work, and construction
Caribbean Graduate School of Theology	Kingston	1986	Counselling, theology, and business
Caribbean School of Medical Sciences, Jamaica	Kingston	2014	Natural and applied science
Caribbean Wesleyan College	Savanna-la-Mar	1996	Theology
Church Teachers' College	Mandeville	1965 as Mandeville Teachers' College	Early childhood education
College of Agriculture, Science and Education	Port Antonio	1910 as Government Farm School	Agriculture, natural science, environment, tourism, business, veterinary science, and education
College of Insurance and Professional Studies	Kingston	1980 as Insurance College of Jamaica	Insurance
Edna Manley College of the Visual and Performing Arts	Kingston	1950 as Jamaica School of Arts and Crafts	Music, education, visual arts, fine arts, drama, dance, and theatre
International University of the Caribbean	Kingston	2005	Counselling, psychology, education, and business
Jamaica Stock Exchange e-Campus	Kingston	2010	Financial services
Jamaica Theological Seminary	Kingston	1960	Theology, counselling, and social work
Joint Board of Teacher Education	Mona	1965	Early childhood education
Knox Community College	Spalding	1947	Environment, tourism, business, education, construction, engineering, and social work
Management Institute for National Development	Kingston	1994	Accounting, human resources, and management
Midland Bible Institute	May Pen	1971	Psychology and theology
Montego Bay Community College	Montego Bay	1975	Tourism, construction, information, business, culinary arts, engineering, agriculture, social work, environment, mortuary science, and fashion
NCB Corporate Learning Campus	Kingston	2006 as NCB Staff Training Centre	Management
National Police College of Jamaica	Spanish Town	2014	Criminal justice
Portmore Community College	Portmore	1992	Business, computers, information, tourism, social work, engineering, and construction
Regent College of the Caribbean	Mandeville	1945 as Jamaica Bible School	Theology and business
SPACS School of Paramedical Studies	Ocho Rios	2012	Phlebotomy and pharmaceutics
Sigma College of Nursing and Applied Sciences	Brown's Town	2004	Health science
United Theological College of the West Indies	Kingston	1966	Ministerial studies
Vector Technology Institute	Kingston	1997	ICT
Vocational Training Development Institute	Kingston	1970	Education, counselling, business, and ICT
Western Hospitality Institute	Rose Hall	1988	Culinary arts and tourism

== See also ==
- Education in Jamaica
