= Protestantism in Jamaica =

Protestantism is the dominant religion in Jamaica. Protestants make up about 65% percent of the population. The five largest denominations in Jamaica are: The New Testament Church of God which is a part of the Church of God (Cleveland, Tennessee), Seventh-day Adventist, Baptist, Pentecostal and Anglican. The full list is below. Most of the Caribbean is Catholic; Jamaica's Protestantism is a legacy of British colonial rule as well as of missionaries who came to the island in the 18th and 19th centuries.

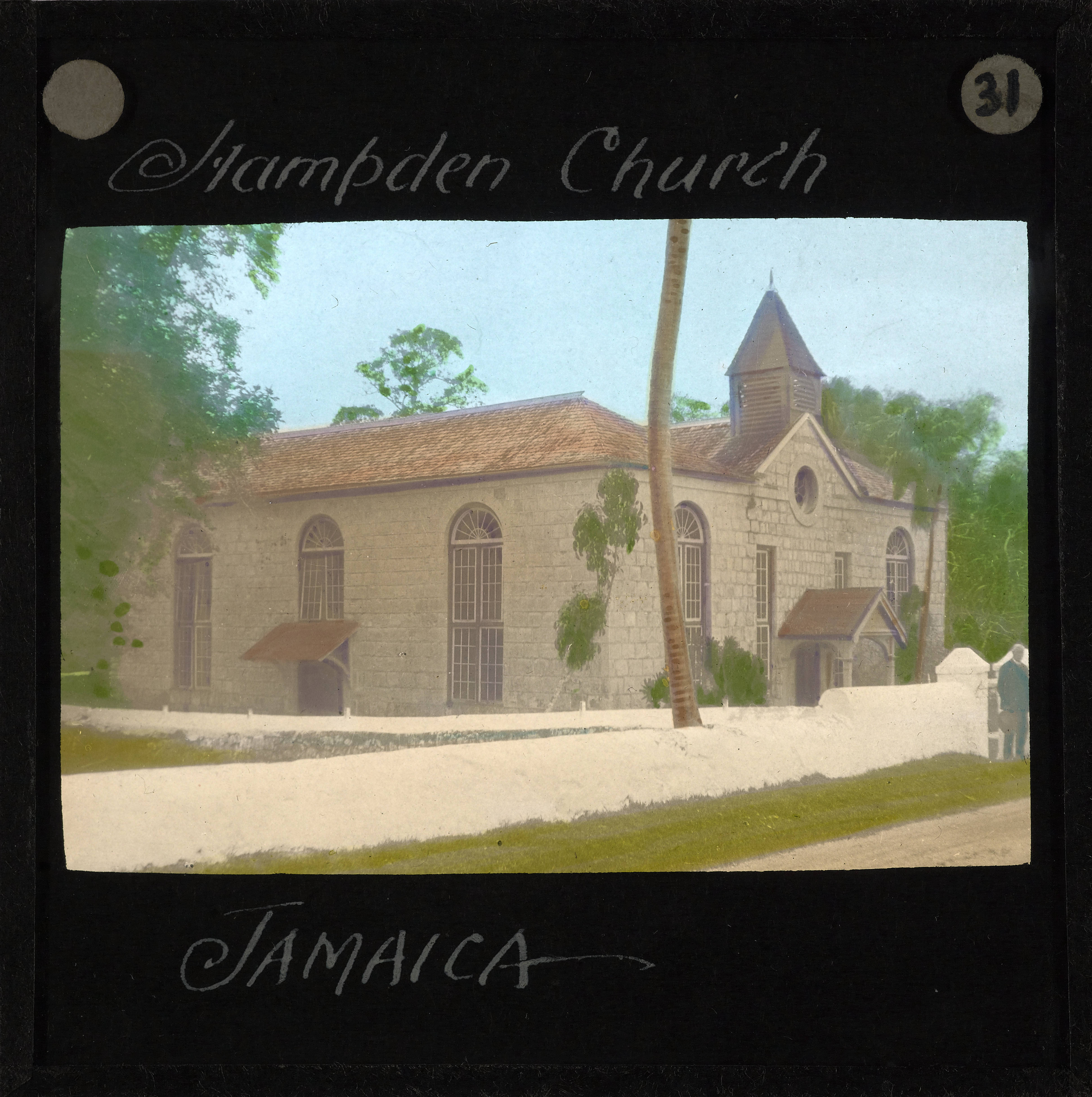
Hampden Church (Church of Scotland)

Missionaries attempted to convert slaves to varying Protestant denominations of Moravians, Baptists, Methodists, and Presbyterians, to name a few. As missionaries worked to convert slaves, African traditions mixed with the religion brought over by Europeans. Protestantism became associated with black nationalism in Jamaica, aiming to improve the lives of blacks who were governed by a white minority during colonial times. Today, Protestantism and Protestant churches and organizations play an important role in society by providing various services to people in need.

The Seventh-day Adventist Church is the largest denomination on the island with a membership of approximately 290,000 members followed by the New Testament Church of God with a membership of approximately 120,000 members.

There are also several church-operated educational systems including a Seventh-day Adventist one which incorporates Northern Caribbean University.

== Statistics ==
Source: Population and Housing Census 2011, Statistical Institute of Jamaica
Denomination	Size	Percentage
Seventh-Day Adventist	322.228	12,01%
Pentecostal	295.195	11,00%
Other Church of God	246.838	9,20%
New Testament Church of God	192.086	7,16%
Baptist	180.640	6,73%
Church of God in Jamaica	129.544	4,83%
Church of God of Prophecy	121.400	4,52%
Anglican	74.891	2,79%
United Church	55.360	2,06%
Jehova's Witness	50.849	1,90%
Methodist	43.336	1,62%
Revivalist	36.296	1,35%
Brethern	23.647	0,88%
Moravian	18.351	0,68%
Total Protestant	1.790.661	66,74%
Total Jamaica	2.683.105	100%

NOTE: Data above does not include category listed as "Other Religion/Denomination" (numbering 169.014).

== History ==
=== Origins ===
Protestantism first established itself in Jamaica in the immediate aftermath of the English conquest of Jamaica in 1655. Prior to this, Jamaica was a Spanish possession with Roman Catholicism as its official, dominant and solely permitted faith. After the English invasion, Catholicism was proscribed and its adherents forced underground, and the Church of England replaced it as the church of state, quickly establishing itself across the island. The Quakers arrived soon thereafter, erecting meeting houses in Port Royal during the latter half of the 17th century.

Prior to white missionaries, George Liele was the first successful venture that spread Christianity to the enslaved in Jamaica. White missionaries from Europe or North America were not the only attempts to provide religion to the slave population of Jamaica. African Americans also played a role in spreading the Protestant faith in Jamaica. George Liele was a former slave from Georgia who made his way to Jamaica. He was recognized as the first successful venture of Christianity among the enslaved in Jamaica. He began Baptist work on the island in the mid-eighteenth century, meaning he was in Jamaica before English and Anglo-American missionaries. At the time Liele was working with slave communities, he was met with opposition from established groups such as the state church and the Church of England. As Liele and his Baptist followers were spreading out across Jamaica, laws were passed to restrict Black Baptist leaders from preaching, teaching slaves how to read and write, as well as from having gatherings because authorities believed these kinds of activities could lead to revolts.

Europeans began to bring their religion to the enslaved in Jamaica starting in the 18th century. Europeans were galvanized to come to the Caribbean by political and religious motives. The English wanted to challenge the Spanish monopoly and influence of Catholicism in the Caribbean. Northern Europeans such as the English and Dutch wanted to break through the political and economic stronghold of Spain and open new territories to spread their faith. The English believed they had a moral responsibility to spread their religion in their colonies.

=== Missionaries ===
In the 18th and 19th centuries white missionaries arrived in Jamaica and brought about conflicting world-views. European Protestant missionaries brought an evangelical Christianity to Jamaica. They emphasized preaching, instruction and observable response in word, moral behavior, and church adherence. Missionaries also brought ideas about abolition of slavery. Some of the missionary churches that led the struggle for the abolition of slavery were the Moravians, Baptists, Methodists, and Presbyterians. Missionaries were identified with slaves and helped serve their needs. They were a catalyst in transforming slave societies. They taught slaves how to read and write and worked to attract slaves to the word of God.

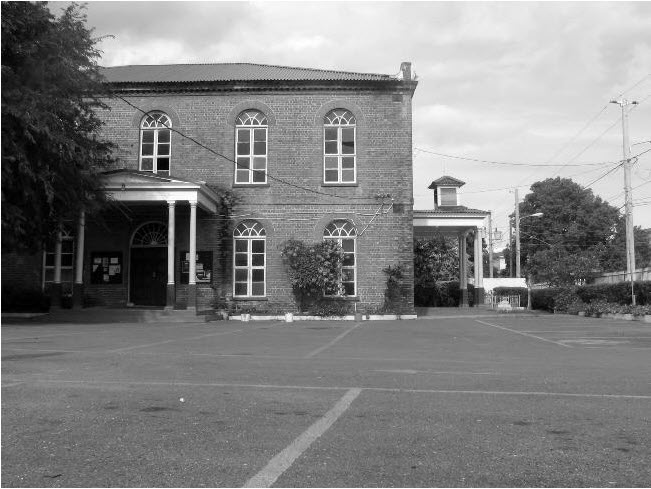
Phillippo Baptist Church in Spanish Town

There was not necessarily a positive response to missionaries in Jamaica. Missionaries tried to transform society and help slaves, but they ultimately failed because they did not attempt to understand African culture and were intolerant to the local culture they came into contact with. They also clashed with the plantocracy who were at the top of Jamaican society. The planters feared missionaries because their work threatened planter's livelihood and status. If missionaries taught slaves how to read and write, they were providing slaves with tools that could help them rebel against the planter class.

=== Slavery and Protestantism ===
By the end of the 19th century more than half of the slave population adopted Christianity. There was a need for Africans who were enslaved to form a cohesive worldview and culture to help make sense of their lives on plantations, and religion allowed them to do this. Slavery was a main factor attracting missionaries to Jamaica. Missionaries wanted to transform slave society and improve social conditions. Protestant missionaries aimed to integrate Christianity with slavery. Planters did not want their slaves converted to Christianity. Converting slaves threatened the social order. Missionaries and slaves challenged the planter's visions of Christianity. To planters, Christianity was a sign of mastery and freedom. Protestantism was defined in legal and ethnic terms, as religion was bound to ethnic identity and freedom. Slaves becoming Christian challenged this. To slaves, Christianity was a way to access knowledge and power. Informed slaves were a threat to planters.

=== Protestantism and Black Nationalism ===
Religion and protest were closely intertwined in resistance and liberation among colonial people. Evangelical religion became a channel of protest, rebellion, and reform in Jamaica. Rebellions were seen as watershed moments for modern Jamaica. Two major rebellions were the slave rebellion in 1831 led by Sam Sharpe and the Morant Bay Rebellion in 1865. The Morant Bay Rebellion aimed to get better wages and land for freed people. These rebellions were part of Baptist resistance that was present from the 1780s until the 1860s. Each rebellion led to significant changes in Jamaican politics and were led by leaders of the Native Baptist Church (234). These rebellions took place during periods of intensified revivalist church movements.

One of the first major figures in Black Nationalism in Jamaica was the preacher Alexander Bedward. He was a minister of the revivalist Jamaica Native Baptist Free Church from 1889 to 1921 and a religious figure who provided leadership for the oppressed. Bedward was both a religious and political figure and connected religion with nationalism. Bedward was a leader in a black-based religious movement that played an enormous historical role in attaining certain civil rights for blacks. Bedward and his followers rose up against racial discrimination, injustice, and the tyranny of colonial rule to improve the lives of the black majority.

In 1921, out of a total population of 832.119 people, the number of Protestant adherents in Jamaica was estimated as follows; 266.478 Anglicans, 106.877 Baptists, 60.000 Wesleyans, 50.000 Presbyterians, 30.000 Moravians, 10.000 Congragationalists, 8.000 members of the Church of Scotland, 5.000 members of the Salvation Army, 2.654 members of the Christian Church, 2.300 Seventh-Day Adventists, 2.245 Quakers, and 945 members of the United Methodist Free Church.

== Protestantism today ==
Today Jamaica has more churches per square kilometer than anywhere else in the world. There are many different denominations, with the Church of God (Cleveland, Tennessee) , Seventh-day Adventist, Baptist, Pentecostal, and Anglican being the five largest. Competition exists among churches to gain or retain membership. This competition is part of the legacy of missionaries in Jamaica. Missionaries created competition and distrust because they competed for followers.

The church plays a large role in society and people look to the church for relief. Churches co-operate to provide services to society like school and health services. Some of these programs are sex education or marriage guidance. Baptists are a denomination that focus on social services. Baptists are not as strict in correct belief and behavior as other denominations. Instead, Baptists in Jamaica tend to focus on the church in everyday life like health issues, material resources, and social relationships.

There are also several church-operated educational systems including a Seventh-day Adventist one which incorporates Northern Caribbean University.
