= Clifford Campbell =

2nd governor-general of Jamaica

The Most Honourable Sir Clifford Campbell ON GCMG GCVO KStJ
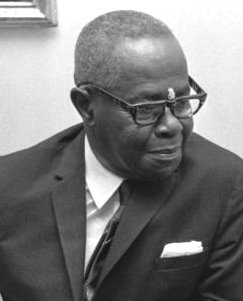

2nd Governor-General of Jamaica
- In office 1 December 1962 – 28 February 1973
- Monarch: Elizabeth II
- Prime Minister: Alexander Bustamante; Donald Sangster; Hugh Shearer
- Preceded by: Kenneth Blackburne
- Succeeded by: Herbert Duffus (acting)

President of the Senate of Jamaica
- In office 31 August 1962 – 30 November 1962
- Succeeded by: George Samuel Ranglin

Speaker of the House of Representatives
- In office 1950–1955
- Monarchs: George VI; Elizabeth II
- Preceded by: Clement Mullings Aitchison
- Succeeded by: Burnet Birthwright Coke

Personal details
- Born: Clifford Clarence Campbell; 28 June 1892 Petersfield, Jamaica
- Died: 28 September 1991 (aged 99)
- Party: Jamaica Labour
- Spouse: Alice Jolly (1894–1976)

Sir Clifford Clarence Campbell ON GCMG GCVO KStJ (28 June 1892 – 28 September 1991) was a Jamaican educator and politician who served as speaker of the House and President of the Senate. In 1962, after Jamaica achieved independence, he was appointed as the first Jamaica-born and second governor-general of Jamaica, serving in that position for more than a decade.

== Early life and family ==
Clifford Campbell was born in Petersfield, Jamaica on 28 June 1892, the son of civil servant James Campbell and his wife Blance (née Ruddock). He was educated at Petersfield Elementary School and Mico Teachers' College. He became a schoolteacher and later was promoted to principal of three schools and headmaster in the parish. On 1 August 1920, Campbell married Alice Estephene. They had four children.

== Political career and death ==
Campbell served as principal of the Grange Hill Government School from 1928 to 1944. In 1944, Campbell entered electoral politics as a member of the recently founded Jamaica Labour Party. He ran a successful campaign for a seat in the House of Representatives and chaired the House Committee on Education from 1945 to 1949. From 1945 to 1954, he was the Vice-President of the Elected Members' Association. In 1950, Campbell was elected as Speaker of the House. In 1962, he was elected as president of the Senate, serving from 31 August 1962 to 30 November 1962 after the nation became independent. A few months after independence, on 1 December 1962, Campbell was sworn in as Governor-General, succeeding Kenneth Blackburne. Campbell became the first Jamaican-born Governor-General and served until 2 March 1973. He died on 28 September 1991 at the age of 99.

== Other ventures and recognition ==
Campbell was enthusiastic about the arts as well as community service. He sat on a number of boards, including the Board of Visitors to Sav-la-Mar Public Hospital, the Advisory Committee of the Knockalva Practical Training Centre, the Westmoreland School Board, the Westmoreland Rice Growers' Association, and the Manchester Committee of the Western Federation of Teachers. Additionally, Campbell was also a member of clubs and societies as the Jamaica National Choral and Orchestral Society, the Jamaica Youth Clubs Council, and the Jamaica Flying Club, of which he was president. He also contributed to other organisations such as the Jamaica Agricultural Society, the Jamaica Cancer Society, and the Jamaica Football Federation. Campbell was awarded the Order of the Nation (ON) and the Order of Saint John. He was also knighted by Queen Elizabeth II, first as Knight Grand Cross of the Order of St. Michael and St. George and later as Knight Grand Cross of the Royal Victorian Order.

Government offices
| Preceded by Kenneth Blackburne | Governor-General of Jamaica; 1962–1973 | Succeeded by Herbert Duffus (acting) |
