= Ranglin =

Ranglin is a surname. Notable people with the surname include:

- Alvin Ranglin (born 1942), Jamaican reggae singer and record producer
- Ernest Ranglin (born 1932), Jamaican jazz and reggae guitarist
- George Samuel Ranglin (1902–after 1972), President of the Senate of Jamaica from 1962 to 1972
