= Stanley Redwood =

Jamaican minister and politician (born 1965)

Reverend Stanley Redwood

President of the Senate of Jamaica
- In office 2012–2013
- Preceded by: Oswald Harding
- Succeeded by: Floyd Morris

Personal details
- Born: 19 June 1964 (age 62) Joint Wood, Saint Elizabeth Parish, Jamaica
- Party: People's National Party
- Education: United Theological College of the West Indies; University of the West Indies

Reverend Stanley St John Redwood (born 3 March 1965) is a Jamaican minister and former politician from the People's National Party. He was the 10th President of the Senate of Jamaica, serving from 18 January 2012 to 10 May 2013.

A former Moravian minister and the founder of the New Holland Church, Redwood served in leadership positions within several universities before entering politics. After unsuccessful bids for a seat in the Jamaican House of Representatives in 2002 and 2007, he was appointed to the Senate after the 2011 general election. Redwood's decision to resign from the Senate and emigrate to Canada with his family in May 2013 was controversial, although Redwood promised to return to Jamaica after settling his family abroad.

== Early life ==
Stanley Redwood was born on 3 March 1965 in Joint Wood, Saint Elizabeth Parish, Jamaica. In 1989 Redwood received a Diploma in Ministerial Studies and a Bachelor of Arts in theology from the United Theological College of the West Indies, and became a Moravian minister. He was appointed to a leadership position over several Moravian Churches in Manchester Parish, to the east of Saint Elizabeth Parish.

Redwood would go on to serve in a number of administrative roles in academia. In 1995 he became the dean of studies at the Jamaica Bible College. In 1996 he began tutoring and supervising the studies of theological students at the International University of the Caribbean (IUC). He became a full-time employee of the IUC in 2005, and served at different times as a lecturer, regional dean, and assistant vice-president at the IUC. In the late 1990s Redwood also held positions with the Social Development Commission and the National Youth Service.

By the time Redwood began his political career, he had been unaffiliated with the Moravian Church, which has a strict prohibition against pastors entering politics, for several years. Subsequent to his break from the Moravian Church, Redwood founded the New Holland Church in Saint Elizabeth Parish.

== Political career ==
In 2002 Redwood ran for the Saint Elizabeth North Western seat in the Jamaican House of Representatives, one of four seats belonging to Saint Elizabeth Parish, as a member of the People's National Party. Redwood claimed that his social work led him into politics, and he campaigned on a platform of bringing infrastructure and a university to the district. His opponent was incumbent representative William J.C. Hutchinson of the Jamaica Labour Party, a first term representative that won the position by 504 votes in a four-way contest during the 1997 general election. A second opponent, Harold Smith of the National Democratic Movement/New Jamaica Alliance, dropped out of the race, citing a medical condition. Although the People's National Party won the 2002 general election overall, Hutchinson retained his seat, defeating Redwood by 247 votes out of 10,903 cast.

In 2003 Redwood was a candidate for one of fifteen seats in the Saint Elizabeth North West local government. The seat, representing Ipswich, had been declared vacant after its previous holder failed to appear for several meetings. After the local election was delayed several times, Redwood withdrew for consideration, citing financial strain caused by the ongoing campaign.

In the 2007 general election, Redwood ran for the Saint Elizabeth South Western seat. The position was held by Donald Buchanan of the People's National Party, who was not seeking re-election. Redwood openly praised Buchanan, and campaigned on continuing his legacy. Redwood's opponent was the Christopher Tufton of the Jamaica Labour Party. In a March 2007 poll, 62% of respondents held favorable views of Tufton, while only 21% held favorable views of Redwood. More respondents (29%) held unfavorable views of Redwood than held favorable views. Garwin Davis of the Jamaica Gleaner posited that Redwood's support of Buchanan may be detrimental to Redwood's campaign, as 59% of respondents held an unfavorable view of the outgoing representative. Additionally, over twice as many respondents had met Tufton than had met Redwood. The Jamaica Labour Party won the general election, and Tufton defeated Redwood by a margin of 1,825 votes out of 17,973 cast.

Following the 2011 general election, which saw the People's National Party regain the majority, Prime Minister Portia Simpson-Miller named Redwood to the Senate of Jamaica, where he was immediately named President of the Senate. He was one of six new senators, and one of five new senators from the ruling People's National Party. Redwood and 62 other new members to the Parliament were sworn in on 17 January 2012.

In April 2013, news broke that Redwood would be resigning from the Senate and emigrating to Canada with his family. Redwood formally resigned on 10 May 2013, ending a sixteen-month term in the Jamaican Parliament. Redwood claimed that he filed the application to emigrate to Canada five years before, following his loss in the 2007 general election, and that he did not know if or when his application would be accepted. He expressed a desire to return to Jamaica after settling his family, and to continue to serve Jamaica from abroad, saying "I am cognisant of the fact that this decision will inevitably disrupt my service as president of the Senate. I harbour a great deal of ambivalence and reticence in this regard. I am certain, however, that this move will open new doors and create more opportunities for me to continue to serve my beloved country among the growing Jamaican Diaspora in Canada." His decision to move was criticized, however, from both the opposition Jamaica Labour Party and by members of the media. Alando Terrelonge, the legal adviser for Jamaica Labour Party's youth wing, Generation 2000, called his decision "cowardice", and continued that "It is a cause for great concern that Redwood would run faster than the many university graduates and civil servants, who have similar options, but who instead make the sacrifice to fight for the Jamaica we all believe in". The Jamaica Gleaner's column "The Gavel" criticized Redwood for campaigning for a "Jamaica-first doctrine" which would exclude dual-citizens from Parliament, despite having already filed papers to emigrate from Jamaica.

In his farewell address to the Senate, Redwood implored the body to move towards full political independence from Great Britain, hold a discussion on adopting nuclear energy, form a powerful anti-corruption agency, and improve Jamaican productivity.
