= St Mary High School, Jamaica =

Saint Mary High School

Location
- St. Mary, Jamaica W.I. Highgate, Jamaica; Jamaica; 18.2668479°N 76.886133°W

Information
- Motto: Faith and Courage
- Founded: 1960
- School district: Highgate
- Principal: Maj. Christine Wright (Acting)
- Faculty: 88
- Grades: 7-13
- Gender: Coed
- Age: 12+
- Average class size: 40
- Campus type: Rural
- Colours: Green and Yellow
- Sports: Football, Track and Field, Tennis, Volleyball, Cross Country, Cricket, Netball
- Website: St. Mary High School

St. Mary High School is a secondary school located in St Mary, Jamaica.

It is a traditional high school for grades 7 through to 13. The school has a diverse racial makeup, the largest minority groups being East Indians and Chinese. The school was the National Schools' Debate champion in 1989, 1996, 1998, and 2005.

In common with all state-run Jamaican secondary schools, St. Mary High uses a selection process to accept students at the grade seven level. Due to the high level of competition from primary level students in St. Mary and surrounding parishes to gain entrance into St. Mary High School, one of two traditional high schools in St. Mary, the majority of entrants are higher-scoring PEP candidates. Students from most primary and preparatory schools can attempt to gain a place by sitting the Primary Exit Profile (formerly the Grade Six Achievement Test).

== History ==
On a little mound, which was originally part of the Constantine Lands. Then, Mitzi Seaga (née Constantine) lived in a house on that little mound which became St. Mary High.

St. Mary High opened on January 12, 1960 to 69 pupils (31 boys and 38 girls) and four teachers including the principal, L. W. Brown, B.Sc. Parents and students assembled, anticipating the beginning of the new school term. At that time, there were three forms, 1-1, 1-2, and 1-3. Currently there are 1,616 students enrolled and 83 teachers. The aforementioned house accommodated the three classrooms, the bathrooms and a kitchen, but was converted into an assembly hall, a sewing room and a library after the building of new classrooms. Presently on that historical site is the music room, the netball, volleyball, and basketball courts and a beautiful garden.

Expansions did not stop, as a World Bank project extended the "B" Block which housed the Home Economics and Business Departments. Since then, three other blocks have been added, with the most recent addition being the Sixth Form block which was relocated and expanded in 2007.

In 1960, the school began with only five clubs (including the popular Glee Club) and offered nine subjects, including Latin. The curriculum now comprises 26 subjects at the CSEC level and 30 units at the CAPE Level. The co-curricular activities have also increased to 21. During lunch time, students dined under an air of classical music; a tradition that still remains today, but in a more modernistic form. A more recent tradition has also been embarked upon: the playing of the National anthem of Jamaica at the beginning of school.

The House system was introduced in January 1962; two years after the school first opened its doors and the first inter-house sports competition in March 1962. The four houses then, Harry, Henry, Stanley, and Whitehorne, competed. Harry House won that event. Cargill and Clarke Houses were later added. Cargill House was named after the second principal, the late Mr. E. U. Cargill and Clarke House after the late track coach, Mr. Douglas Clarke.

The first Cadet inspection was held in February 1966. The Unit has grown over the years.

== Campus ==
The campus is located in hilly Highgate Saint Mary Parish, Jamaica. It has grown considerably since the time of its opening in 1960 and has the largest campus of any high school in St. Mary. The school has a large auditorium, cafeteria/lunch room, many computer and science labs, a well stocked and professional library adjacent to the sixth form block, in addition to numerous classroom blocks and several staff-rooms.

Although St. Mary High School is not a boarding institution, foreign or out of town teachers have on-campus living options with apartment style cottages across from the nurses and guidance counselors stations. The school has a spacious volleyball/netball court that is often called the Cadet Square and a football field across the main roadway that runs parallel to the campus.

Uniforms are worn, which for girls is a green tunic with white blouse, and for boys khaki pants and shirt, with green epaulettes with white or yellow stripes to indicate grades. Female students at the sixth form level wear green pleated skirts along with short sleeved white shirts, a school crest attached to shirt pocket, and a green, white and yellow striped tie. Male sixth form students wear the traditional khaki pants along with a white short or long sleeved shirt, school crest attached to front pocket, and the same tie worn by their female counterparts.

== Curriculum ==
Subjects offered to students include Technical Drawing, Building Technology, Industrial Technology, Mathematics, Physical Education, General Science, Social Studies, Home Economics, Biology, Geography, History, Physics, Food and Nutrition, Clothing and Textiles, Principles of Accounting, Office Administration, Principles of Business, English, Sociology, Music, Chemistry, Information Technology, Visual Art, Literature, Law, Spanish, Agricultural Science, and Religious Education.

Students take the Caribbean Examinations Council (CXC) Exam after five years at the school. Grades attained in the CXC Exam determine which students move on to tertiary institutions, and which move on to grades 12 and 13 sixth form.

== Notable alumni ==
- Floyd Morris – first visually-challenged Jamaican Senator/President of the senate in Jamaica
- Professor Verene Shepherd – Professor of Social History, University of the West Indies
- Nikole Mitchell: Olympic athlete (Barcelona 1992, Bronze Medal Relay Team
- Percival Spencer: Olympic athlete (Atlanta 1996)

== Principals ==
- L. W. Brown
- E.U. Cargill (1970-1982/3?)
- P. N. Hamilton (1982/3 -)
- E. V. Johnson( -2014?)
- Julliet Frazer-Sadaar (2014 - 2024)
- Christine Wright (2024–present)

== See also ==
- Jamaica High School Football Champions
- Education in Jamaica
