= Oswald Harding =

Jamaican politician (1935–2026)

The Honourable Oswald Harding OJ, CD, KC

9th President of the Senate of Jamaica
- In office 2007–2011
- Preceded by: Syringa Marshall-Burnett
- Succeeded by: Stanley Redwood

4th President of the Senate of Jamaica
- In office 1980–1984
- Preceded by: Allan George Richard Byfield
- Succeeded by: Jeanette Rose Grant-Woodham

Attorney General of Jamaica
- In office 1986–1989
- Preceded by: Winston Spaulding
- Succeeded by: Rapheal Carl Rattray

Personal details
- Born: 3 November 1935 Kingston, Jamaica
- Died: 24 June 2026 (aged 90) Kingston, Jamaica
- Party: Jamaica Labour Party
- Spouse: Marigold Harding
- Children: Jeremy Harding; Zachary Harding

Oswald Gaskell Harding OJ, CD, KC (3 November 1935 – 24 June 2026) was a Jamaican Labour Party politician, and the longest-serving senator in the nation's history. He was born in Kingston. Harding was the first person to serve as President of the Senate of Jamaica for two non-consecutive tenures, serving from 1980 to 1984 and from 2007 to 2011. First appointed to the Senate in 1977, he served in the body continuously until 2002, and rejoined the Senate from 2007 until his retirement from politics in 2011. His first period as a senator was the longest continuous tenure in the body's history.

== Life and career ==
In the 1976 general election, Harding ran as the Jamaica Labour Party (JLP) candidate for the Saint Andrew East Rural seat in the Jamaican House of Representatives. The seat was held in the previous term by Eric Bell of the People's National Party (PNP), but Bell was not a candidate in 1976. Harding's opponent in the election was Roy McGann of the PNP. Harding lost the election, 8,710 to 5,929, a difference of 2,781 votes, and the People's National Party won the election overall.

In 1977 he was appointed to the Senate, and after the JLP won the 1980 general election, became President of the Senate. He held the position until 1984, when he became Leader of Government Business in the Senate, and was made a Minister without portfolio in the Foreign Affairs Ministry. In 1986, he was made Minister of Justice and became the Attorney General of Jamaica. After the PNP recaptured control of the government in the 1989 general election, Harding became the Leader of Opposition Business. Harding served in the senate continuously from 1977 until 2002, when he asked not to be re-appointed after the 2002 general election. His time in the Senate was the longest continuous tenure in the body's history.

Harding attempted to win a seat in the House of Representatives twice during his tenure as a senator. In the 1993 general election, he attempted to unseat incumbent representative John A. Junor, a PNP member occupying the Manchester Central seat. Junor won the election, 5,980 to 4,356, a difference of 1,624 votes. In the 1997 election, Harding attempted to unseat another sitting PNP representative, Horace O. Clue, as part of a three way race for the Saint Andrew East Rural seat that Harding contested twenty years prior. Securing 4,819 votes, Harding came second in the voting, behind Horace Clue's 6,769 votes, but well ahead of the 1,026 votes secured by National Democratic Movement candidate Andre Foote. The People's National Party won both elections overall.

The 2007 general election saw the Jamaica Labour Party return to power for the first time since the election of 1989. Harding returned to the senate, and to the position of President of the Senate, becoming the first person to serve in that role over two non-contiguous periods. Immediately prior to the 2011 general election being called, Harding announced that he would be retiring from politics. At the time of his retirement, he was the longest-serving senator in Jamaican history.

Harding died on 24 June 2026, at the age of 90.

== Views ==
In October 2000, Harding urged the government to ratify the United Nations Second Optional Protocol to the International Covenant on Civil and Political Rights, which aims at abolishing the death penalty. In urging the change, he cited a recent decision by the Central Committee of the World Council of Churches calling for an end to the death penalty, as well as that he remained personally unconvinced that the death penalty was an effective deterrent to criminals. When Bruce Golding became Prime Minister of Jamaica in 2007, Harding again urged the government to ratify the UN Protocol.

Harding proposed in 2002 that a body be created to regulate commercial activities undertaken by churches. He noted that there was no system to protect churchgoers when a church's leadership acted against the interests of its members. He stressed that such an organisation would not be involved in religious decisions, only businesses and property that churches operate commercially.

In 2004, Harding delivered a speech in which he said that it was not the government's place to criminalise homosexual relations or prostitution. Drawing on the writings of John Stuart Mill and the findings of the 1957 Wolfenden report, Harding indicated where he thought that law and morality should intersect by saying "It is not the function of the law to intervene in the private lives of citizens or seek to enforce any particular pattern of behaviour further than to preserve public order and decency and to protect the citizen from what is offensive or injurious and to provide safeguards against exploitation and corruption of others".

During a speech delivered in 2007, Harding spoke out against the United States-led Iraq War, describing it as unwinnable and saying "This was a war of choice. One of the most preventable wars in modern times. Launched in the face of worldwide condemnation". In the same speech, Harding stressed that while it was acceptable to criticise American foreign policy because it affects the rest of the word, letting that criticism lead to anti-Americanism would be counterproductive.

== See also ==
- List of presidents of the Senate of Jamaica
