= Santana Morris =

Educator (b. 1990)

Santana N. Morris
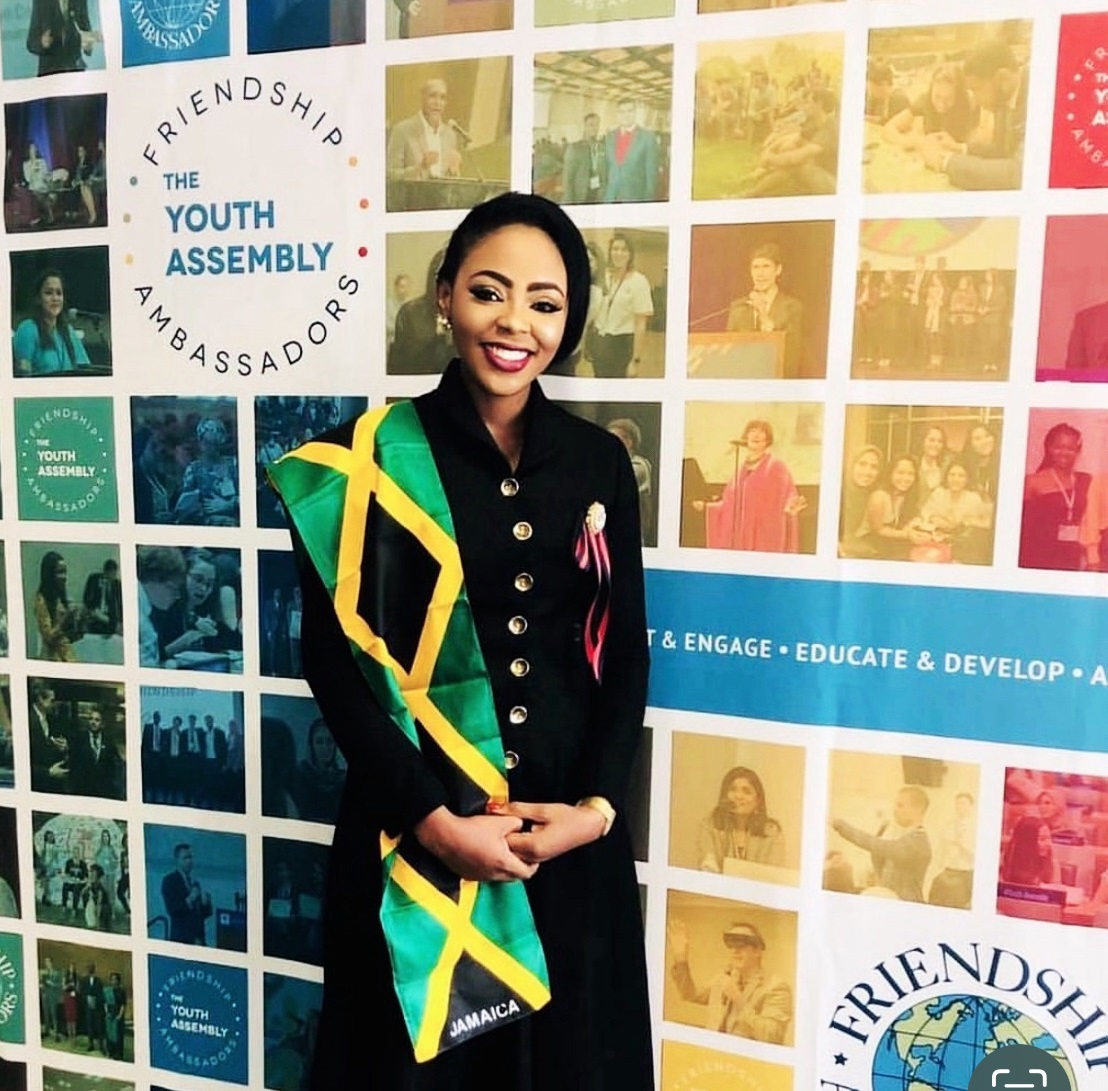
- Born: 4 September 1990 (age 36); St. James, Jamaica

Academic background
- Education: Shortwood Teachers' College; University of Technology; International Centre for Parliamentary Studies; University of the West Indies

Academic work
- Institutions: Jamaica Intensive Reading Clinic
- Main interests: Education Policy, Leadership, Community Development, Economic Development, Philanthropy
- Website: www.santanamorris.com

Santana N. Morris (born September 4, 1990) is a Jamaican educator, lecturer, and motivational speaker, known for her contributions to literacy and education in Jamaica and the Caribbean. Morris is the founder and executive director of the Jamaica Intensive Reading Clinic (JIRC), an institution focused on advancing literacy through specialized programs and volunteer network.

== Early life and education ==
Santana Morris was born on 4 September 1990 in St. James, Jamaica. She completed a diploma and a bachelor's degree in education with honors from Shortwood Teachers' College. She further earned a Master of Business Administration from the University of Technology and a Master of Educational Leadership. Morris is currently pursuing a PhD in Business Administration.

== Career ==
Morris launched her career in education and community service in 2016 by establishing the Jamaica Intensive Reading Clinic. Under her leadership, the clinic introduced the All-Island Summer Reading Camp, first held across seven Jamaican parishes under the theme "Revolutionizing Lives in the 21st Century Towards Holistic Development."

In July 2017, Morris organized the second Summer Reading Camp with the aim of promoting literacy across Jamaica. In an interview for Caribbean Life, she said the following about the aim of the camp:

"There’s a lot going on in society and with the lack of employment among youth and lack of equality for women — literacy is the foundation that will help combat and fight against it. [She has] a desire to support this through education and cultural development and to create awareness for people to show how important it is."

From 2017 to 2019, Morris served as Jamaica's Youth Ambassador to the United Nations. In September 2018, as Youth Ambassador, Morris launched a series of talks regarding safe spaces for Jamaican youth. The talks were held in numerous high schools and colleges in Jamaica under the theme "Preserving our Youth Through Strategic Intervention in Creating Safe Spaces in the 21st Century". In February 2019, Morris participated in TEDxUWIMona as a speaker.

In addition to her work with JIRC, Morris is a lecturer in Business Studies and works as an education and business consultant.

== Volunteer work and advocacy ==
Morris has been involved in community service, particularly through her work with Kiwanis International, where she served as a Distinguished President. Her advocacy includes promoting youth participation in global decision-making and supporting educational reforms in Jamaica, including the introduction of bilingual literacy teaching in early childhood education.

== Awards and honors ==
Morris has received numerous awards for her work which includes the Prime Minister's Youth Award for Excellence in Leadership (2017) and the Youth Musgrave Medal (2019) for education, community development, and leadership. In her role as Youth Ambassador, Morris contributed to educational reforms in Jamaica, including initiatives focused on creating safe spaces for youth across the country. The list of awards and honors includes:

- 2016: Governor General's Achievement Award for Achievement for Excellence in Community Work & Leadership (issued in Jamaica)
- 2016: I Believe Initiative Ambassador (issued in Jamaica)
- 2017: 30-Under-30 Emerging Leaders/Change Makers Award (issued in Washington, D.C.)
- 2017: Prime Minister's Youth Award for Excellence in Leadership (issued in Jamaica)
- 2019: Exemplifying "Service Above Self" (issued by Rotaract Montego Bay)
- 2019: Youth Musgrave Medal (issued by Council Institute of Jamaica)
- 2020: Distinguished President (issued by Kiwanis International)

== Publications ==
Morris has authored several educational workbooks designed to build critical thinking and analytical skills in learners. These include KWL Comprehension Workbook: Building Critical Thinking and Analytical Skills (2019) and Strategic Reading Record Book: Building Critical & Analytical Skills (2019). She has also written on entrepreneurial topics, such as in Airbnb Edge: Transforming Spaces into Profit (2023).

=== Selected bibliography ===
- Morris, Santana N. (2019). KWL Comprehension Workbook: Building Critical Thinking and Analytical Skills. Montego Bay: Jamaica Intensive Reading Clinic. ISBN 1791387888.
- Morris, Santana N. (2018). KWL Vocabulary Workbook: Vocabulary Building Strategies (Volume). Montego Bay: Jamaica Intensive Reading Clinic. ISBN 1792849575.
- Morris, Santana N. (2019). Double Entry Reading Journal. Montego Bay: Jamaican Intensive reading Clinic. ISBN 1793202702.
- Morris, Santana N. (2019). Strategic Reading Record Book: Building Critical & Analytical Skills. Montego Bay: Jamaica Intensive Reading Clinic. ISBN 1793801401.
- Morris, Santana (2014). Keeping Control of Your Daily Tasks Diary: Record-Track-Complete. Jamaica: Independently published. ISBN 978-1730874123.
- Morris, Santana (2019). Using First Line Strategy To Build Critical Thinking Skills In Literacy:. Independent. ISBN 978-1091329911.
- Alphabets in the Jamaican Context
- Motivating Children to Master The Art of Reading
- Building Moral and Social Values in Children's Lives
- Keeping Control of your Daily Tasks Diary
- Using Fine Line Strategy to Build Critical Thinking Skills
- Morris, Santana (2023). Airbnb Edge (Transforming Spaces into Profit). Independently published. ISBN 979-8395425416.
