= Allan George Richard Byfield =

Jamaican politician (1913–1990)

President of the Senate of Jamaica
- In office 1972–1980
- Preceded by: George Samuel Ranglin
- Succeeded by: Oswald Harding

Allan George Richard Byfield (14 December 1913 – 30 November 1990) was a Jamaican school teacher and politician. He was a senator of the West Indies Federation from 1958 to 1962, and president of the Senate of Jamaica from 1972 to 1980. In the late 1970s he was minister of education.

== Career ==
Byfield was one of the leaders of the Jones Town Baptist church. He became a prominent educator and politician. He was a schoolmaster at the Trench Town Government School in 1958. When the West Indies Federation was created that year Governor General Lord Hailes appointed two senators from each island apart from Montserrat. Byfield was named by the Jamaican Council of Ministers chaired by Norman Manley. He was one of the senators for Jamaica, the other being Douglas James Judah. Byfield was made a member of the Federation's Council of State as a Minister without Portfolio. The Federation was dissolved in May 1962.

When the Trench Town Senior School was established in 1963 the Kingston School Board named Byfield as headmaster, but the Ministry of Education rejected the appointment. Manley refused to get involved in the controversy. In April 1964 Byfield was Acting Secretary of the Jamaica Teachers' Association (JTA). Byfield became Deputy Chairman of the People's National Party, headed by Norman Manley. In the 1972 Senate of Jamaica, there were eight members from the Jamaica Labour Party (JLP) and thirteen from the People's National Party (PNP). Byfield was president and Benjamin Clare was Deputy President. Byfield was president of the Senate until 1980. He was succeeded by Oswald Harding.

In 1976 Byfield was elected member of parliament for St. Mary Western on the PNP ticket, holding office until 1980. In April 1978 Byfield was acting Minister of Education. He agreed to recommend to the government two points of the NUDT claim, one being that teachers should be given permanent status after four months service, and the other that they should be able to see the principal's file on them at any time. While he was Minister of Education the JTA called a strike, and during the strike he suffered a stroke from which he did not recover.

== Death and legacy ==
Byfield died in Saint Andrew Parish on 30 November 1990, at the age of 76.

In the early 1970s the government was considering naming the St. Ann's Bay Secondary School in honor of Byfield, but due to agitation by Rastafarians and other groups decided to name it after Marcus Garvey instead. The A.G.R. Byfield Highway in Saint Ann Parish is named after him. It was built on reclaimed land in St. Ann's Bay in the 1970s.

== See also ==
- List of presidents of the Senate of Jamaica
