= Knox College =

Knox College may refer to:

- Knox College (Illinois), a liberal arts college in Galesburg, Illinois, US
- Knox College (Jamaica), a junior school, high school, and community college in Spaldings, Jamaica
- Knox College, Otago, a hall of residence and school of ministry at the University of Otago, Dunedin, New Zealand
- Knox College, Toronto, a theological college of the University of Toronto in Ontario, Canada

== See also ==
- Knox Academy, secondary school in Haddington, Scotland
- Knox Grammar School, in Sydney, Australia
