= Syringa Marshall-Burnett =

Jamaican politician (1935–2014)

Syringa Marshall-Burnett CD, JP

8th President of the Senate of Jamaica
- In office 1995–2007
- Preceded by: Winston V. Jones
- Succeeded by: Oswald Harding

Personal details
- Born: 11 May 1935
- Died: 10 October 2014 (aged 79)

Syringa Marshall-Burnett CD, JP (11 May 1935 – 10 October 2014) was a Jamaican nurse, educator, and former politician with the People's National Party. A leader in the effort to create a university-based nursing education program, Marshall-Burnett would go on to serve as the head of the nursing education program at the Mona campus of the University of the West Indies. She was the 8th President of the Senate of Jamaica, serving from 1995 through 2007.

== Early life and nursing career ==
Syringa Marshall-Burnett was born in 1935 in Saint Mary Parish, Jamaica. Marshall-Burnett had a desire to go into nursing from a young age, and applied to the training program at Kingston Public Hospital when she was 14. Turned down at the time for being too young, she would re-apply and be accepted four years later. At the time, this entailed three years of on-site training in a hospital and half a year of training as a midwife. In 1959 Marshall-Burnett travelled to the University of Toronto, where she received training in hospital nursing and public health nursing, achieving a Bachelor of Nursing degree in 1967. In 1972 she received a master's degree in adult mental health and nursing education from New York University. She would later obtain a diploma in management studies from the University of the West Indies.

Around this time, Dr. Mary Jane Seivwright was playing a central role in an effort to create a university-based nursing education program. The University of the West Indies's Mona, Jamaica campus began a certificate program in 1968, which Seivwright became the head of in 1971. Marshall-Burnett expressed an interest in becoming a faculty member, and was offered a position in 1972. She and Seivwright pushed for a degree-giving nurse practitioner program, which was established in 1977. Another bachelor's degree-granting program, geared towards already practising nurses, was established five years later. Marshall-Burnett went on to become the head of the school of nursing in 1989, and established its masters program in 2001. Marshall-Burnett retired from the position the following year, but remained a part-time lecturer.

In addition to her role advancing the nursing program at the University of the West Indies, Marshall-Burnett was involved in a number of other nursing initiatives. In 1993, she set up an examination and licensing system for nurses. Marshall-Burnett served five terms as the president of the Nurses Association of Jamaica, where she campaigned for housing and better pay for nurses. She also served as the editor for the organisation's journal. She was a member of the World Health Organization's Expert Committee on Nursing, and served on the advisory boards of the American Journal of Nursing and the Journal of Advanced Nursing.

== Political career ==
In 1992, Marshall-Burnett was appointed by the Prime Minister to fill a vacant seat in the Senate of Jamaica. She had attracted the Prime Minister's attention through her negotiations with the government on behalf of the Nurses Association of Jamaica. Marshall-Burnett moved on to become the Deputy President of the Senate, and in 1995 became its President. She served in the position until 2007. During her entire time in the Senate, the People's National Party was the majority party in the Jamaican Parliament. She died on 10 October 2014.

== Honours ==
In reconnection of her contributions to the field of nursing, Syringa Marshall-Burnett was awarded the Order of Distinction (Commander Class) in 1990, and was appointed a Justice of the Peace. An academic center at the University of the West Indies, the Syringa Marshall-Burnett World Health Collaborating Centre for Nursing and Midwifery Education, was named in her honour.
