= United Theological College of the West Indies =

Protestant seminary in Jamaica

Coordinates: 18.0072128°N 76.7415833°W

The United Theological College of the West Indies (UTCWI) is an ecumenical seminary training male and female clergy in Kingston, Jamaica, for Anglican and Protestant denominations throughout the Caribbean.

== History ==
The college was founded in 1966 (60 years ago), from three earlier colleges: Union Theological College (Methodist, Presbyterian, Moravian, Congregationalist and Disciples of Christ), Calabar College (Baptist) and St. Peter’s College (Anglian). It moved to its current, custom-built site adjacent to University of the West Indies (UWI) Mona campus in the early 1970s. The Roman Catholic St. Michael's Theological College was built alongside at the same time.

It is affiliated to the University of the West Indies, forming the Department of Theology in the Faculty of Arts and Education (formerly Arts and General Studies).

It offers a Doctor of Ministry degree in co-operation with Columbia Theological Seminary in Georgia, United States.

== Notable alumni ==
- Neville Callam, General Secretary of the Baptist World Alliance
- Charles Davidson, Bishop of Guyana since 2015
- Howard Gregory, Bishop of Jamaica and the Cayman Islands since 2012, and Archbishop of the West Indies since 2019
- Stanley Redwood, 10th President of the Senate of Jamaica
- Adlyn White, Moderator of the Synod of the United Church in Jamaica and the Cayman Islands
