= Sly Mongoose (song) =

"Sly Mongoose" is a Trinidadian folk song and calypso which is widely recognized in the Caribbean.

== Recordings ==
Sly Mongoose performed by Phil Madison

The song was first recorded by Phil Madison in August 1923. The song was also recorded by Jamaican musician Sam Manning in the mid-1920s and Lord Invader (of "Rum and Coca-Cola" fame) in 1946. A different version with a similar name, "Slide Mongoose Slide" was recorded in the Bahamas in 1935, performed by the Nassau String Band. The songs are clearly related but the version recorded in the Bahamas has notable differences, not only are the lyrics different but also the singing style and melody, it is in the style of other Bahamian folk songs recorded in 1935, like Bimini Gal, Bellamina, and Abaco is a Pretty place. Other Caribbean artists to record the song include The Gaylads, Aston "Family Man" Barrett, Ahadu & Light of Saba, Beverley's Allstars, Harry Belafonte, Max Woiski Sr. (under the alternative song title "Ba-Anansie"), Ernest Ranglin and Monty Alexander. Versions with varying lyrics have also been sung as calypsos.

It has been performed and recorded by the German musician James Last and his orchestra and by American jazz musicians including Charlie "Bird" Parker, Louis Armstrong and Benny Goodman.

The Jamaican National Dance Theatre Company have performed it in a dance choreographed by Rex Nettleford.

== See also ==
- Alexander Bedward
