= Verene Shepherd =

Jamaican academic (born 1951)

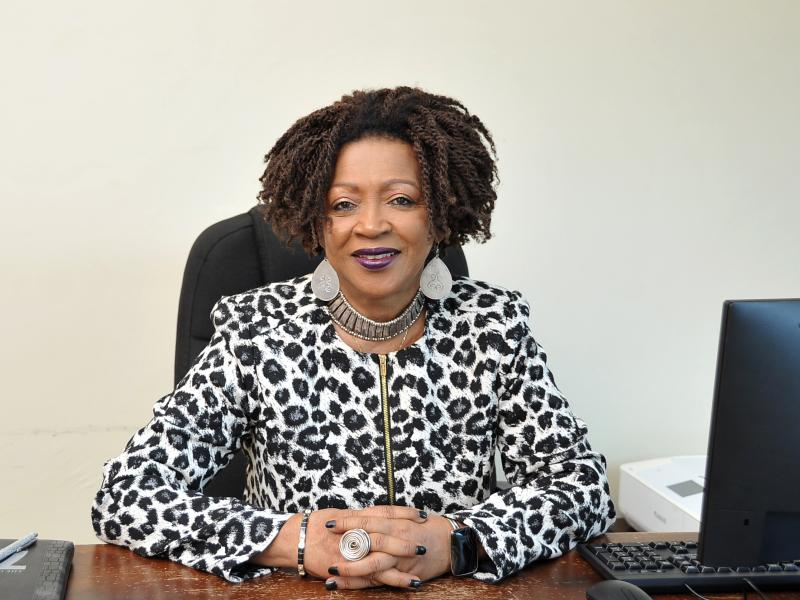
- Professor Shepherd
- Born: Verene Albertha Lazarus; 1951 (age 74–75); Hopewell, Saint Mary Parish, Jamaica
- Education: St. Mary High School; University of the West Indies (BA; MPhil); University of Cambridge (PhD)
- Occupations: Academic and writer
- Employer(s): University of the West Indies, Mona

Verene Albertha Shepherd (née Lazarus; born 1951) is a Jamaican academic who is a professor of social history at the University of the West Indies in Mona. She is the director of the university's Institute for Gender and Development Studies, and specialises in Jamaican social history and diaspora studies.

She has published prolifically in journals and books on topics including Jamaican economic history during slavery, the Indian experience in Jamaica, migration and diasporas and Caribbean women's history, and is a contributor to the 2019 anthology New Daughters of Africa.

== Early life and education ==
Shepherd was born in Hopewell, Saint Mary Parish, Jamaica, one of the ten children of Ruthlyn and Alfred Lazarus. She attended Huffstead Basic School, Rosebank Primary School, and St. Mary High School, and then completed a teaching certificate at Shortwood Teachers' College. Shepherd went on to the University of the West Indies, where she completed a BA degree in history in 1976 and a M.Phil. in history in 1982. She was later awarded a PhD from the University of Cambridge in 1988 for her thesis on the economic history of colonial Jamaica.

== Academic career ==
In 1988, Shepherd joined the Department of History at the University of the West Indies. She was elevated to a full professorship in 2001, and in 2010 was appointed director of the Institute for Gender and Development Studies. She has served as president of the Association of Caribbean Historians, chair of the Jamaica National Heritage Trust, chair of the Jamaica National Bicentenary Committee.

Shepherd specialises in Jamaican social history and diaspora studies. She is an advocate of reparations for slavery, and in 2016 was appointed co-chair of Jamaica's National Council on Reparations. She is also vice-president of the Committee on Reparations of the CARICOM. Shepherd has also held several positions within the Office of the United Nations High Commissioner for Human Rights (OHCHR), serving as a member of the Working Group of Experts on People of African Descent (WGEPAD) and the Committee on the Elimination of Racial Discrimination. She was chair of WGEPAD from 2011 to 2014, and lobbied for the creation of the International Decade for People of African Descent.

== Zwarte Piet controversy ==
In 2013, in her role as chair of WGEPAD, Shepherd was asked to inquire into Zwarte Piet ("Black Pete"). She authored a letter, on "headed, official UN high commission for human rights paper" to the Dutch government proposing that it move towards ending the tradition, and in a later interview with TV news program EenVandaag described the character as "a throwback to slavery". Her remark complicated and further polarized an ongoing national debate, accompanied by protests and social media campaigns, in particular as she was supposedly speaking on behalf of the UN when this was not actually the case. Her remarks that Sinterklaas, a national feast in the Netherlands central to Dutch culture, could just be done away with in its entirety because "one Santa Claus is enough", (apparently referring to the American version who partially descends from Sinterklaas but is decidedly not the same), caused much anger and unleashed a public reaction that continues to have ramifications years later. A number of public figures, including then prime minister Mark Rutte and opposition leader Geert Wilders, spoke out in defence of Zwarte Piet. A Belgian UNESCO official later claimed that Shepherd had no authority to speak on behalf of the UN and was "abusing the name of the UN to bring her own agenda to the media".

== Selected works ==
- Pens and pen-keepers in a plantation society: aspects of Jamaican social and economic history, 1740–1845 (thesis), University of Cambridge, 1988
- Transients to Settlers: The Experience of Indians in Jamaica 1845–1950: East Indians in Jamaica in the Late 19th and Early 20th Century, Peepal Tree Press, 1994, ISBN 978-0948833328
- Engendering History: Caribbean Women in Historical Perspective (edited with Bridget Brereton and Barbara Bailey), Palgrave MacMillan, 1995, ISBN 978-0312127664
- Women in Caribbean History: The British-Colonised Territories (compiled and edited), Ian Randle Publishers, 1999, ISBN 9789768123305
- I Want to Disturb My Neighbour: Lectures on Slavery, Emancipation and Postcolonial Jamaica, Ian Randle Publishers, 2000 ISBN 9789766372552
- Maharani's Misery: Narratives of a Passage from India, University of West Indies Press, 2002, ISBN 978-9766401214
- Working Slavery-Pricing Freedom: Perspectives from the Caribbean, Africa and the African Diaspora (edited), James Currey, 2002, ISBN 978-0852554654
- Questioning Creole: Creolisation Discourses in Caribbean Culture (edited with Glen L. Richards), Ian Randle Publishers, 2004, ISBN 978-9766370398
- Caribbean Slavery in the Atlantic: A Student Reader, Ian Randle Publishers, 2004, ISBN 978-9768123619
- Liberties Lost: The Indigenous Caribbean and Slave Systems (with Hilary Beckles), Cambridge University Press, 2004, ISBN 978-0521435444
- Trading Souls: Europe's Transatlantic Trade in Africans (with Hilary Beckles), 2007
- Livestock, Sugar and Slavery: Contested Terrain in Colonial Jamaica, Ian Randle Publishers, 2009, ISBN 9789766372569
- "Historicizing Gender-Based Violence in the Caribbean" in Margaret Busby (ed.), New Daughters of Africa, 2019.

== External link ==
- Keynote speech by Verene Shepherd in 2020 on a conference of the Reparations Committee of the CARICOM
