= Garveyism =

Political ideology

Garveyism is an aspect of black nationalism that refers to the economic, racial and political policies of UNIA-ACL founder Marcus Garvey.

Ethiopia, thou land of our fathers,
Thou land where the gods loved to be,
As storm cloud at night suddenly gathers
Our armies come rushing to thee.
We must in the fight be victorious
When swords are thrust outward to gleam;
For us will the vict'ry be glorious
When led by the red, black, and green.

— Lyrics from the UNIA anthem

Ideologically, Garvey was a black nationalist and racial separatist. Generally referring to dark-skinned peoples of African descent as "Negroes", he and the UNIA insisted that that term should be capitalized, thus affording dignity and respect to those whom it described. His ideas were influenced by a range of sources. According to biographer Colin Grant, while he was living in London, Garvey displayed "an amazing capacity to absorb political tracts, theories of social engineering, African history and the Western Enlightenment." Garvey was exposed to the ideas about race that were prevalent at the time; his ideas on race were also heavily informed by the writings of Edward Wilmot Blyden and by his work in London with Dusé Mohamed Ali.

During the late 1910s and 1920s, Garvey was also influenced by the ideas of the Irish independence movement, to which he was sympathetic. He saw strong parallels between the subjugation of Ireland and the global subjugation of black people, and identified strongly with the Irish independence leader Éamon de Valera. In 1922, he sent a message to Valera stating that "We believe Ireland should be free even as Africa shall be free for the Negroes of the world. Keep up the fight for a free Ireland."

For Garvey, Ireland's Sinn Féin and the Irish independence movement served as blueprints for his own black nationalist cause. In July 1919 he stated that "the time has come for the Negro race to offer up its martyrs upon the altar of liberty even as the Irish [had] given a long list from Robert Emmet to Roger Casement." He also expressed admiration for the Indian independence movement, which was seeking independence from British rule in India, describing Mahatma Gandhi as "one of the noblest characters of the day".

== Race and racial separatism ==
"Race first" was the adage which was widely used in Garveyism. In Garvey's view, "no race in the world is so just as to give others, for the asking, a square deal in things economic, political and social", but rather each racial group will favor its own interests. Rejecting the "melting pot" notion of much 20th century American nationalism, he thought that European Americans would never willingly grant equality to African Americans, and thus it was inefficient for the latter to ask for it. He was hostile to the efforts of the progressive movement to agitate for social and political rights for African Americans, arguing that this was ineffective and that law would never change the underlying racial prejudice of European Americans.

He argued that the European-American population of the U.S. would never tolerate the social integration which was being advocated by activists like W. E. B. Du Bois because he believed that campaigns for such integration would lead to anti-black riots and lynchings. He openly conceded that the U.S. was a white man's country and thus, he did not think that African Americans should expect equal treatment within it. Thus, he opposed attempts to socially and economically integrate the different races which lived within the country. Garveyism promoted the view that whites had no duty to help blacks achieve racial equality, maintaining the view that the latter needed to advance themselves on their initiative. He advocated racial separatism, but he did not believe in black supremacy. He also rallied against Eurocentric beauty standards among blacks, seeing them as impediments to black self-respect.

[African Americans should] stop making[...] noise about social equality, giving the White people the idea that we are hankering after their company, and get down to business and build up a strong race, industrially, commercially, educationally and politically, everything social will come afterwards.

— Marcus Garvey, 1921

In the U.S., ideas about the need for black racial purity became central to Garvey's thought. He vehemently denounced miscegenation, believing that mixed-race individuals were "torn by dual allegiances" and they would often ally themselves "with the more powerful race," thus, they would become "traitors to the [black] race". Garvey argued that mixed-race people would be bred out of existence. Cronon believed that Garvey exhibited "antipathy and distrust of anybody but the darkest-skinned Negroes"; the hostility towards black people whose African blood was not considered "pure" was a sentiment which Garvey shared with Blyden.

This view caused great friction between Garvey and Du Bois, with the former accusing Du Bois and the NAACP of promoting "amalgamation or general miscegenation". He rallied against what he called the "race destroying doctrine" of those African Americans who were promulgating racial integration in the U.S., instead, he maintained the view that his UNIA stood for "the pride and purity of race. We believe that the white race should uphold its racial pride and perpetuate itself, and we also believe that the black race should do likewise. We believe that there is room enough in the world for the various race groups to grow and develop by themselves without seeking to destroy the Creator's plan by the constant introduction of mongrel types."

Garvey told the historian J. A. Rogers that he and his followers were "the first fascists", adding that "Mussolini copied Fascism from me, but the Negro reactionaries sabotaged it". Arguing that Garvey "imitated white supremacist ideas at random", the scholar John L. Graves commented that "racism permeated nearly every iota of his ideology," with Garveyism representing "a gospel of hate for whites".

Garvey's belief in racial separatism, his advocacy of the migration of African Americans to Africa, and his opposition to miscegenation endeared him to the KKK, which supported many of the same policies. Garvey was willing to collaborate with the KKK in order to achieve his aims, and it was willing to work with him because his approach effectively acknowledged its belief that the U.S. should only be a country for white people and campaigns for advanced rights for African Americans who are living within the U.S. should be abandoned. Garvey called for collaboration between black and white separatists, stating that they shared common goals: "the purification of the races, their autonomous separation and the unbridled freedom of self-development and self-expression. Those who are against this are enemies of both races, and rebels against morality, nature and God." In his view, the KKK and other far-right white groups were "better friends" of black people "than all other groups of hypocritical whites put together" because they were honest about their desires and intentions.

== Pan-Africanism ==
Garvey was a Pan-Africanist, and an African nationalist. In Jamaica, he and his supporters were heavily influenced by the pan-Africanist teachings of Dr Love and Alexander Bedward. In the wake of the First World War, Garvey called for the formation of "a United Africa for the Africans of the World". The UNIA promoted the view that Africa was the natural homeland of the African diaspora. While he was imprisoned, he penned an editorial for the Negro World titled "African Fundamentalism", in which he called for "the founding of a racial empire whose only natural, spiritual and political aims shall be God and Africa, at home and abroad."

Garvey supported the Back-to-Africa movement, which had been influenced by Edward Wilmot Blyden, who migrated to Liberia in 1850. However, Garvey did not believe that all African Americans should migrate to Africa. Instead, he believed that an elite group, namely those African Americans who were of the purest African blood, should do so. The rest of the African-American population, he believed, should remain in the United States, where it would become extinct within fifty years.

A proponent of the Back-to-Africa movement, Garvey called for a vanguard of educated and skilled African Americans to travel to West Africa, a journey which would be facilitated by his Black Star Line. Garvey stated that "The majority of us may remain here, but we must send our scientists, our mechanics and our artisans and let them build railroads, let them build the great educational and other institutions necessary", after which other members of the African diaspora could join them. He was aware that the majority of African Americans would not want to move to Africa until it had the more modern comforts that they had become accustomed to in the U.S. Through the UNIA, he discussed plans for a migration to Liberia, but these plans came to nothing and his hope to move African Americans to West Africa ultimately failed.

Wheresoever I go, whether it is England, France or Germany, I am told, "This is a white man's country." Wheresoever I travel throughout the United States of America, I am made to understand that I am a "nigger". If the Englishman claims England as his native habitat, and the Frenchman claims France, the time has come for 400 million Negroes to claim Africa as their native land... If you believe that the Negro should have a place in the sun; if you believe that Africa should be one vast empire, controlled by the Negro, then arise.

— Garvey, August 1920

In the 1920s, Garvey referred to his desire for a "big black republic" in Africa. Garvey's envisioned Africa was to be a one-party state in which the president could have "absolute authority" to appoint "all of his lieutenants from cabinet ministers, governors of States and Territories, administrators and judges to minor offices". According to the scholar of African-American studies Wilson S. Moses, the future African state which Garvey envisioned was "authoritarian, elitist, collectivist, racist, and capitalistic", suggesting that it would have resembled the later Haitian government of François Duvalier.

Garvey never visited Africa himself, and he did not speak any African language. He knew very little about the continent's varied customs, languages, religions, and traditional social structures, and his critics frequently believed that his views of the continent were based on romanticism and ignorance. It has been suggested that the European colonial authorities would not have given Garvey permission to visit colonies where he would be calling for decolonization.

For instance, the Jamaican writer and poet Claude McKay noted that Garvey "talks of Africa as if it were a little island in the Caribbean Sea." Garvey believed in negative stereotypes about Africa which portrayed it as a backward continent that was in need of the civilizing influence of Western, Christian states. Among his stated aims, he wanted "to assist in civilizing the backward tribes of Africa" and he also wanted "to promote a conscientious Christian worship among" them. His belief that Africans would ultimately be liberated by the efforts of the African diaspora which was living outside the continent has been considered condescending.

Moses stated that instead of being based on respect for indigenous African cultures, Garvey's views of an ideal united Africa were based on an "imperial model" of the kind which was promoted by western powers. When he extolled the glories of Africa, Garvey cited the ancient Egyptians and Ethiopians who had built empires and monumental architectural structures, which he cited as evidence of civilization, rather than the smaller-scale societies which lived on other parts of the continent. In doing so, he followed the lead of white academics of that era, who were similarly ignorant of most of African history and who focused nearly exclusively on ancient Egypt. Moses thought that Garvey "had more affinity for the pomp and tinsel of European imperialism than he did for black African tribal life". Similarly, the writer Richard Hart noted that Garvey was "much attracted by the glamour of the British nobility", an attraction which was reflected when he honored prominent supporters by giving them such British-derived titles as "Lords", "Ladies", and "Knights". Garvey's head was not turned, however, by the scholarly authority of Harvard University professor George Reisner whose opinion Garvey challenged on the pages of The Negro World.

== Economic views ==
We must prepare now by organizing ourselves all over the world, by building businesses, stores and factories to sustain our people and free ourselves.

— Marcus Garvey

Garvey believed in economic independence for the African diaspora and through the UNIA, he attempted to achieve it by forming ventures like the Black Star Line and the Negro Factories Corporation. In Garvey's opinion, "without commerce and industry, a people perish economically. The Negro is perishing because he has no economic system". In his view, European-American employers would always favor European-American employees, so to gain more security, African Americans needed to form their own businesses. In his words, "the Negro[...] must become independent of white capital and white employers if he wants salvation." He believed that financial independence for the African-American community would ensure greater protection from discrimination, and provide the foundation for social justice.

Economically, Garvey supported capitalism, stating that "capitalism is necessary to the progress of the world, and those who unreasonably and wantonly oppose it or fight against it are enemies of human advancement." In the U.S., Garvey promoted a capitalistic ethos for the economic development of the African-American community, advocating black capitalism. His emphasis on capitalist ventures meant, according to Grant, that Garvey "was making a straight pitch to the petit-bourgeois capitalist instinct of the majority of black folk."

He admired Booker T. Washington's economic endeavours but criticized his focus on individualism: Garvey believed that African-American interests would best be advanced if businesses included collective decision-making and group profit-sharing. His advocacy of capitalistic wealth distribution was a more equitable view of capitalism than the view of capitalism which was then prevalent in the U.S.; he believed that some restrictions should be imposed on individuals and businesses in order to prevent them from acquiring too much wealth, in his view, no individual should be allowed to control more than one million dollars and no company should be allowed to control more than five million dollars. While he was living in Harlem, he envisioned the formation of a global network of black people who would trade among themselves, believing that his Black Star Line would contribute to the achievement of this aim.

There is no evidence to support the view that Garvey was ever sympathetic to socialism. While he was living in the U.S., he strongly opposed attempts to recruit African Americans into the trade union movement by socialist and communist groups, and he urged African Americans not to support the Communist Party. This led to heavy scrutiny from communist group leaders and figureheads such as Grace Campbell, among others. He believed that the communist movement did not serve the interests of African Americans because it was a white person's creation. He stated that communism was "a dangerous theory of economic or political reformation because it seeks to put government in the hands of an ignorant white mass who have not been able to destroy their natural prejudices towards Negroes and other non-white people. While it may be a good thing for them, it will be a bad thing for the Negroes who will fall under the government of the most ignorant, prejudiced class of the white race." In response, the Communist International characterised Garveyism as a reactionary bourgeois philosophy.

== Black Christianity ==
Whilst our God has no color, yet it is human to see everything through one's own spectacles, and since the white people have seen their God through white spectacles, we have only now started out (late though it be) to see our God through our own spectacles.

— Garvey, on viewing God as black, 1923

Grant noted that "Garveyism would always remain a secular movement with a strong under-tow of religion". Garvey envisioned a form of Christianity which would specifically be designed for black African people, a sort of black religion. Reflecting his own view of religion, he wanted this black-centric Christianity to be as close to Catholicism as possible.

Even so, he attended the foundation ceremony of the African Orthodox Church in Chicago in 1921. According to Graves, this Church preached "the orthodox Christian tradition with emphasis on racism", and Cronon suggested that Garvey promoted "racist ideas about religion".

Garvey emphasised the idea of black people worshipping a God who was also depicted as black. In his words, "If the white man has the idea of a white God, let him worship his God as he desires. Since the white people have seen their God through white spectacles, we have only now started out to see our God through our own spectacles[...] we shall worship Him through the spectacles of Ethiopia." He called for black people to worship images of Jesus of Nazareth and the Virgin Mary that depicted these figures as black Africans. In doing so, he did not make use of pre-existing forms of black-dominated religions. Garvey had little experience with them, because he had attended a white-run Wesleyan congregation when he was a child, and later, he converted to Catholicism.

== See also ==
- Back-to-Africa movement – Political movement in the United States during the 19th and 20th centuries
- Black nationalism – Ideology that seeks to develop a Black national identity
- Black power – Political slogan and ideology
- Black supremacy – Belief in superiority of black people
- Rastafari – Abrahamic new religious movement originating in 1930s Jamaica

== Sources ==
- Carter, Shawn (2002). "The Economic Philosophy of Marcus Garvey". Western Journal of Black Studies. 26 (1): 1–5. ProQuest 200342374. Archived from the original on 2020-07-22 – via Questia.
- Chapman, Thandeka K. (2004). "Foundations of Multicultural Education: Marcus Garvey and the United Negro Improvement Association". The Journal of Negro Education. 73 (4): 424–434. doi:10.2307/4129626. JSTOR 4129626.
- Christian, Mark (2008). "Marcus Garvey and African Unity: Lessons for the Future From the Past". Journal of Black Studies. 39 (2): 316–331. doi:10.1177/0021934708317364. JSTOR 40282562. S2CID 144286771.
- Clarke, John Henrik (1974). "Marcus Garvey: The Harlem Years". Transition (46): 14–19. doi:10.2307/2934951. JSTOR 2934951.
- Cronon, Edmund David (1955). Black Moses: The Story of Marcus Garvey and the Universal Negro Improvement Association. Madison: University of Wisconsin Press.
- Fergus, Claudius (2010). "From Prophecy to Policy: Marcus Garvey and the Evolution of Pan-African Citizenship". The Global South. 4 (2): 29–48. doi:10.2979/globalsouth.4.2.29. S2CID 144306818.
- Fierce, Milfred C. (1972). "Economic Aspects of the Marcus Garvey Movement". The Black Scholar. 3 (7): 50–61. doi:10.1080/00064246.1972.11658623. JSTOR 41206341.
- Grant, Otis B. (2003). "Social Justice versus Social Equality: The Capitalistic Jurisprudence of Marcus Garvey". Journal of Black Studies. 33 (4): 490–498. doi:10.1177/0021934702250031. S2CID 144710693.
- Grant, Colin (2008). Negro with a Hat: The Rise and Fall of Marcus Garvey. London: Jonathan Cape. ISBN 978-0-09-950145-9.
- Graves, John L. (1962). "The Social Ideas of Marcus Garvey". The Journal of Negro Education. 31 (1): 65–74. doi:10.2307/2294548. JSTOR 2294548.
- Hart, Richard (1967). "The Life and Resurrection of Marcus Garvey". Race. 9 (2): 217–237. doi:10.1177/030639686700900206. S2CID 145291305.
- Moses, Wilson S. (1972). "Marcus Garvey: A Reappraisal". The Black Scholar. 4 (3): 38–49. doi:10.1080/00064246.1972.11431283. JSTOR 41163608.
