= Bedwardism =

Afro-Jamaican Christian religion

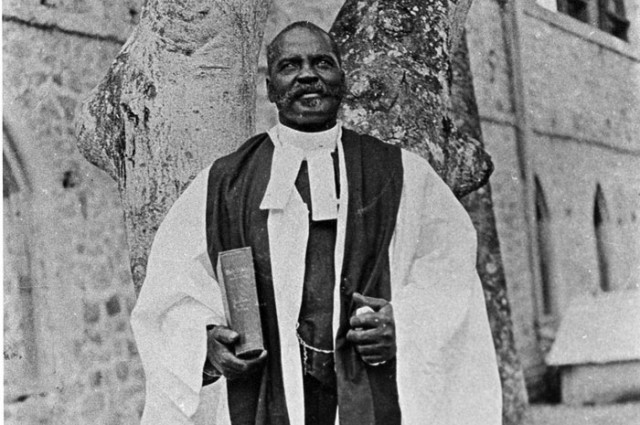
- Alexander Bedward
- Classification: Afro-Jamaican
- Origin: 1889; Jamaica
- Other name: Jamaica Native Baptist Free Church

Bedwardism, more properly the Jamaica Native Baptist Free Church, was a religious movement of Jamaica.

== Origins ==
Bedwardism was founded in August Town, Saint Andrew Parish, in 1889 by Harrison "Shakespeare" Woods, an African-American emigrant to Jamaica, and named for Alexander Bedward (1848–1930), who was referred to as "That Prophet" and "Shepherd."

It was one of the most popular Afro-Jamaican politico-religious movements from the 1890s to the 1920s. Bedwardism attracted tens of thousands of followers with a call for social justice, as well as socioeconomic programs for the lower classes.

== Beliefs ==
Bedwardian literature describes Bedwardism as a new religion, the successor to Christianity and Judaism. Its actual teachings differ little from those of most Christian denominations, stressing the importance of recognizing Jesus Christ as both God and man in part of the Trinity, as well as frequent fasting. Even so, because the movement likened the ruling classes to the Pharisees, it met with disapproval and even suppression by them. One of the few unique concepts of Bedwardism is the belief that August Town, Jamaica corresponds to Jerusalem for the Western world.

Bedward himself claimed at times to be the reincarnation of prophets including Moses, Jonah and John the Baptist, and was ruled insane by courts on two occasions.

== Death and legacy ==
The movement lost steam in 1921 after Bedward and hundreds of his followers marched into Kingston, where he failed to deliver on his claim to ascend into Heaven, and many were arrested. In 1930, Bedward died in his cell of natural causes.

Many of his followers became Garveyites and Rastafarians, bringing with them the experience of resisting the system and demanding changes of the colonial oppression and the white oppression. Rastafari casts Marcus Garvey as a Messiah, while also casting Bedward in the role of John the Baptist.

== See also ==
- Ethiopian movement
- Rastafari
- Leonard Howell
- Marcus Garvey
