= Jamaica Intensive Reading Clinic =

Jamaican NGO focused on literacy

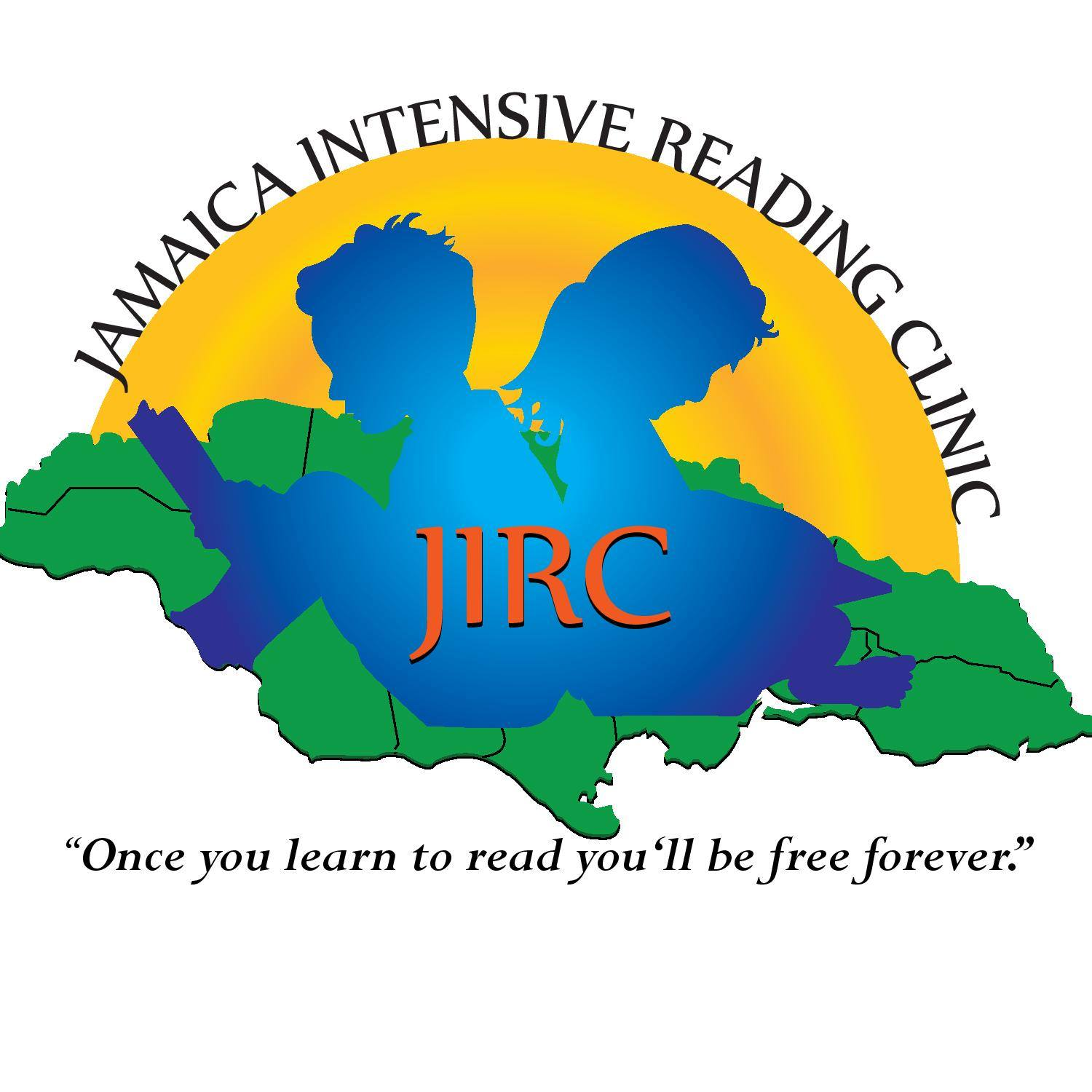
- Formation: 2014
- Founder: Santana Morris
- Founded at: Montego Bay, Jamaica
- Type: Non-governmental organization
- Legal status: Active
- Purpose: Education, Youth
- Headquarters: Montego Bay
- Location: Jamaica
- Region served: Caribbean Region
- Official language: English
- Executive Director: Santana Morris
- Website: jamaicaintensivereadingclinic.com

Jamaica Intensive Reading Clinic (abbreviation: JIRC) is a non-governmental organization based in Montego Bay, Jamaica. The organization was founded in 2016 with the goal of promoting and enhancing education among youths in Jamaica

== Mission and activities ==
Jamaica Intensive Reading Clinic was founded in Montego Bay in 2014 by Santana Morris. The mission of the organization is to help students master the art of reading and promotion of the education and literacy among the youths of Jamaica.

JIRC created three All Island Summer Reading Camps between 2016 and 2018 which was held in all Jamaican parishes. The aim of the camp was to "eradicate the low literacy rate in Jamaica by strategically teaching students to read".

Second edition of the camp was held between 24 and 28 July 2017 and it gathered around 1500 children on 15 locations across the 14 parishes under the theme ‘Breaking Barriers: Building Literate Communities in the 21st Century’. The program addressed five main components of literacy - fluency, comprehension skills, vocabulary development, phonemics and phonological development. Literary specialists and principals were engaged to recommend students most in need of the intervention.

The JIRC's Executive Director is Santana Morris.
