= Kenneth Blackburne =

British colonial official (1907–1980)

Sir Kenneth Blackburne GCMG GBE
- Portrait by Walter Stoneman, 1957

1st Governor-General of Jamaica
- In office 6 August 1962 – 30 November 1962
- Monarch: Elizabeth II
- Prime Minister: Alexander Bustamante
- Preceded by: Post created
- Succeeded by: Clifford Campbell

Governor of Jamaica
- In office 18 December 1957 – 6 August 1962
- Monarch: Elizabeth II
- Preceded by: The Lord Caradon
- Succeeded by: Post abolished; Himself as governor-general

Governor of the Leeward Islands
- In office 1950–1956
- Monarchs: George VI; Elizabeth II
- Preceded by: The Earl Baldwin of Bewdley
- Succeeded by: Alexander Williams

Personal details
- Born: Kenneth William Blackburne; 12 December 1907 Bordon, Hampshire, England
- Died: 4 November 1980 (aged 72) Douglas, Isle of Man

Sir Kenneth William Blackburne GCMG GBE (12 December 1907 – 4 November 1980) was a British colonial official who was the first governor-general of Jamaica. He was knighted in 1952.

== Early life ==
Blackburne was born on 12 December 1907 in Bordon Camp, Bordon, Hampshire, England, the first son of The Very Reverend Harry Blackburne. He attended Marlborough College and graduated from Clare College at the University of Cambridge with a degree in Modern Languages and Geography.

== Career ==
Blackburne entered the colonial service in 1930 and served in Nigeria, Palestine and the Gambia. He then served in the West Indies from 1943 to 1947 and subsequently as director of colonial information services in London from 1947 to 1950, before returning to the West Indies. He served as Governor of the Leeward Islands from 1950 to 1956 and as Governor of Jamaica from 1957 until 1962. When Jamaica received its independence in August 1962, Blackburne was appointed as the Governor-General; he served in that position for three months till 30 November 1962 when his Jamaican replacement, Clifford Campbell, took office.

Blackburne was also the patron of many organisations including the Commodore Royal Jamaica Yacht Club, the Amateur Swimming Association of Jamaica, the Jamaica Anti-Tuberculosis League, the Jamaica Automobile Association, the Jamaica Cricket Board of Control, the Jamaica Historical Society, and many others.

== Personal life and death ==
On 18 May 1935, Blackburne married Bridgette Senhouse Constant, the daughter of James Mackay Wilson and Alice (née Goldie-Taubman). They had a son, Martin Andrew (born July 1944), and a daughter, Jean Alice (born February 1948). Blackburne was an Anglican and enjoyed tennis and sailing. He died on 4 November 1980 in Douglas, Isle of Man.

Government offices
Preceded by The Earl Baldwin of Bewdley	Governor of the Leeward Islands; 1950–1956	Succeeded by Alexander Williams
Preceded by The Lord Caradon	Governor of Jamaica; 1957–1962	Position abolished
New creation	Governor-General of Jamaica; 1962	Succeeded by Clifford Campbell
