= Floyd Morris =

Jamaican politician

Professor Floyd Morris

Member of the Senate of Jamaica
- Incumbent
- Assumed office 2025
- In office 1990–2007

12th President of the Senate of Jamaica
- In office 2013–2016
- Preceded by: Stanley Redwood
- Succeeded by: Tom Tavares-Finson

Minister of State in the Ministry of Labour and Social Security
- In office 2001–2007

Personal details
- Born: Floyd Emerson Morris; 23 July 1969 (age 57)
- Spouse: Shelly-Ann Gayle (m. 2011)
- Education: University of the West Indies (BA, MPhil, DPhil)

Professor Floyd Emerson Morris (born 23 July 1969) is a Jamaican politician from the People's National Party. He was the 12th President of the Senate of Jamaica. Morris, who began losing his sight during high school and lost it fully six years later, became the first blind member of the Senate when he was appointed in 1998.

== Early life ==
Professor Floyd Morris was born on 23 July 1969 in Bailey's Vale, near Port Maria, Saint Mary Parish, Jamaica. His father, Lloyd Morris, was a fireman, and his mother, Jemita Pryce, was a dressmaker. Morris has four brothers and three sisters.

Morris began to lose his sight in high school, due to glaucoma. Attempts to treat the glaucoma with medication and laser treatments were unsuccessful, and six years after he began to lose his sight, he became completely blind.^{[A]} Morris' worsening eyesight left him unable to complete schoolwork, and Morris left St. Mary High School after grade 11 to become a poultry farmer. Morris' mother, Jemita Pryce, was a strong supporter of the People's National Party (PNP). Much of her work came from government contracts from the area's Member of Parliament, Horace Clarke, and when the PNP party fell out of power, her work dried up. When the PNP regained power in 1989, Clarke gave Morris enough money to expand his farm from 30 chickens to 200. In order to protect his business from failing should the PNP lose power again, Morris made sure that some of the farm's staff were members of the rival Jamaica Labour Party. The farm eventually expanded to 27 acres, including vegetables.

In 1991 Morris traveled to Kingston to seek assistance from the Jamaica Society for the Blind. Morris learned Braille through the Society, and decided to complete his high school studies and go to college. After being rejected by Campion College, a Kingston high school, Morris enrolled at Mico Evening College. After two years at Mico, Morris applied to and was accepted by University of the West Indies (UWI). Morris received a Bachelor of Arts in Mass Communication from UWI, and would later return to get a Master of Philosophy in Government degree and pursue a Doctorate in the same field.

In his last year of undergraduate studies at UWI, Prime Minister P. J. Patterson visited the university to give a speech. Morris criticized the Prime Minister's education policies during the question and answer session. Realizing that he had an interest in politics, Morris joined the People's National Party Youth Organisation. Through this organization, Morris traveled to the 1997 World Youth Congress in Cuba, where he attracted attention as a skilled public speaker. When he returned, he began giving speeches in support of the PNP as part of the 1997 general election. After the PNP won the election, Horace Clarke and other PNP members lobbied the Prime Minister to name Morris as a senator.

== Political career ==
Morris was first appointed to the Jamaican Senate by Prime Minister P. J. Patterson in 1998, becoming its first blind member. He served in the Senate until 2007. When the governing People's National Party lost the 2007 general election it lost several Senate seats including Morris'. From 2001 to 2007, he served as the Minister of State in the Ministry of Labour and Social Security, under Ministers Danny Buchanan and Horace Dalley. He regained his Senate seat in 2012, following the 2011 general election, which saw the People's National Party regain the majority.

Morris was appointed president of the Senate on 17 May 2013, after being nominated for the position by the Senate's Leader of Government Business and seconded by the leader of Opposition Business. He replaced Reverend Stanley Redwood, who resigned from the Jamaican Senate to move to Canada.

== Personal life ==
Morris is a member of the Seventh-day Adventist Church. He is married to Shelly-Ann Gayle. The couple was married in July 2011 at the University of the West Indies (Mona) Chapel. He is the host of a two-hour weekly radio broadcast "Seeing From A Different Perspective", which focuses on disability and societal issues. He received his Doctor of Philosophy (PhD) degree from the University of the West Indies in 2017. Morris has written an autobiography called, "By Faith, Not By Sight-The Autobiography of Jamaica's First Blind Senator".

== Notes ==
^A Sources differ on what age Morris began to lose his sight. The Jamaica Observer says age 14, while Adventist News Network says age 17. Both sources agree that his blindness progressed over a period of six years.
