= Alexander Bedward =

Afro-Jamaican religious leader

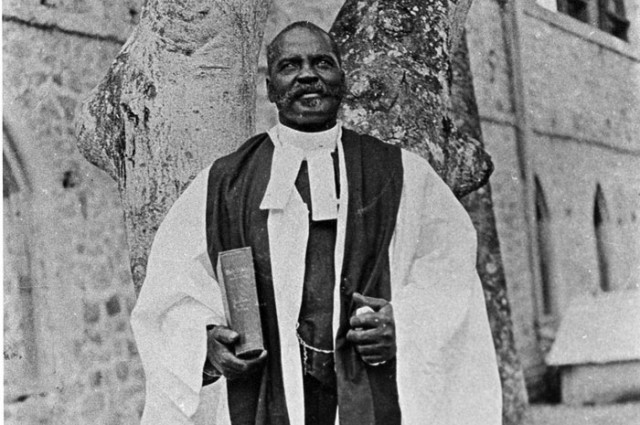
- Alexander Bedward
- Born: 1848; Saint Andrew Parish, Jamaica
- Died: 8 November 1930 (aged 81–82)

Alexander Bedward (1848, Saint Andrew Parish, north of Kingston, Jamaica - 8 November 1930) was the founder of Bedwardism. He was one of the most successful preachers of Jamaican Revivalism. Along with Joseph Robert Love, Bedward was one of the forerunners of Marcus Garvey and his brand of pan-Africanism.

== Early life ==
In his twenties, Bedward worked on the construction of the Panama Canal. Jamaican labourers were subjected to harsh working conditions, before being boarded up at night in shoddy, disease-ridden shacks. In addition, white American workers were paid significantly more than their black counterparts. This experience would have a profound effect on Bedward's later life.

Bedward had charisma, an acute sense of theatre, a scorching sense of injustice, and an unshakeable faith in the righteousness of his words and deeds.

== Native Baptist Preacher ==
After spending time in Panama, he returned to Jamaica and was baptized by a local Baptist preacher. He became not merely leader of a Revival branch but of a new movement, the Bedwardites. White and mixed-race Jamaicans worried about the African influences on these Native Baptist interpretations of Christianity.

In the 1880s, he started to gather large groups of followers by conducting services which included reports of mass healings. He identified himself with Paul Bogle, the Baptist leader of the Morant Bay rebellion, and he stressed the need for changes to the inequalities in race relations in Jamaican society. He reportedly said, “Brethren! Hell will be your position if you do not rise up and crush the white man. The time is coming! There is a white wall and a black wall. And the white wall has been closing around the black wall: but now the black wall has become bigger than the white.”

Many Afro-Jamaican Christian churches sprung up in the aftermath of Emancipation. In 1889, Bedward became the leader of one of them, the Jamaica Native Baptist Free Church. He ministered to his flock by Hope River, and his congregation grew large and thrived. He warned that the government of the Colony of Jamaica was passing laws to oppress black people, and was robbing them of their money and their bread.

By 1894, the Native Baptist Free Church was so thriving that it was able to commission a temple on the banks of the river, a confirmation in stone and slate that the Great Revival had produced genuine competition to the traditional centres of community power.

In 1895, Bedward was arrested for sedition, but critics within the government succeeded in having him sectioned in a mental asylum. With the help of a sympathetic lawyer, Bedward secured his freedom. On release he continued his role as a Revival healer and preacher. He urged his followers to be self-sufficient and at its height the movement gathered about 30,000 followers. He told his followers to sell their possessions including owned land and give him all the profits. Some of these followers did just that.

Over the next quarter century, Bedward became an antiestablishment hero, preaching a message of black power. The crowds at Hope River grew larger, and increasing numbers committed to his regime of fasting and temperance. Events such as the First World War fitted into his message that God was punishing the white Western world for hundreds of years of avarice, corruption and brutality.

== Ascension claim and later life ==
Later, Bedward proclaimed that he was a reincarnation of Jesus and that, like Elijah, he would ascend into Heaven in a flaming chariot. He then expected to rain down fire on those who did not follow him, destroying the whole world. He and 800 followers marched into Kingston "to do battle with his enemies."

On New Year's Eve, in 1920, now an older man, Bedward told his followers that the LORD had called him to fly up to Heaven. He promised his followers his ascent would hasten the Rapture; before the sun had set, he would be gone, and they would be free.

It is reported that thousands of his followers and critics turned up to see if his ascension would occur. He took to his chariot—a chair balanced in a tree—and declared that his ascension would occur at ten o'clock that morning. He later revised the time of his ascension to three in the afternoon and ten in the evening. No ascension took place.

Eventually, he climbed down from the tree and went home. His supporters were disappointed, but his critics reacted with glee and ridiculed him.

In 1921, Bedward and his followers were arrested, and he was sent to a mental asylum for the second time, where he remained to the end of his life. In 1930, he died in his cell from natural causes.

== Legacy and Garveyism ==
His contemporary, Robert Love, the inspirational advocate of racial uplift via education and political engagement, always thought Bedward to be nothing more than a skilled showman whom a hysterical establishment had managed to turn into a martyr.

Bedwardism planted a seed from which a culture of racial consciousness grew, and found its most emphatic form in Marcus Garvey and his Universal Negro Improvement Association (UNIA). With Garvey’s rise to prominence in the 1910s, Bedward became convinced that God had only ever intended for him to be one of a sequence of prophets rather than a messiah — Aaron to Garvey’s Moses is how he termed it — paving the way for the younger man to deliver his people into the Promised Land. He led his followers into Garveyism by finding the charismatic metaphor: one the high priest, the other prophet, both leading the children of Israel out of exile.

His impact was that many of his followers became Garveyites and Rastafari, bringing with them the experience of resisting the system and demanding changes of the colonial oppression and the white oppression. Rastafari has taken the idea of Garvey as a prophet, while also casting him in the role of John the Baptist, by virtue of his "voice in the wilderness" call taken as heralding their expected Messiah, "Look to Africa where a black king shall be crowned."

Kei Miller wrote a novel about Bedward entitled Augustown, published in Britain in 2016.

One of the followers of Bedwardism was Robert Hinds, the second-in-command to Leonard Howell's nascent Rastafari.

== Songs ==
Bedward is mentioned in an early Trinidadian recording of Jamaican mento classic Sly Mongoose by Sam Manning, who recorded it in December 1925 for the Okeh label (the song was recorded by many artists with changing lyrics). He is mentioned in Jamaican reggae artist Etana's "I Am Not Afraid." He is also mentioned in the Jamaican folk classic "Dip Dem," which was recorded by Louise Bennett for her 1954 album Jamaican Folk Songs. The famous refrain from the Jamaican folk went: “Dip dem, Bedward, dip dem / Dip dem in the healing stream / Dip dem deep, but not too deep / dip dem fi cure bad feeling.”

"Bedward the Flying Preacher" by Singers & Players featuring Prince Far I appears on the 1983 album Staggering Heights, and the 1985 compilation Pay It All Back Vol. 1, both on Britain's On-U Sound label. This was also released as a 7" single on the On-U Sound offshoot Sound Boy in 2003, credited to Prince Far I, with a dub version on the B-side. Prince Pompadoe released a 7" 45 called "Dip them Bedward" issued in Jamaica on the Prophet label in 1976 and reissued on the UK's Pressure Sounds record label. The song was produced by Vivian 'Yabby You' Jackson. It was reissued on the CD Deeper Roots, a compilation of Yabby You productions.

Jamaican singer Paul Hamilton also released a 45' entitled "Who Say Bedward Fly?"

== See also ==
- Ethiopian movement
- Rastafari
- Leonard Howell
- Marcus Garvey
- Afrocentrism
