= Winston V. Jones =

Jamaican politician (1917–2000)

Winston Vassel Jones (13 December 1917 – 29 June 2000) was a Jamaican politician. He was born in Prattville, Manchester, Jamaica. Jones was member of the House of Representatives of Jamaica for Manchester Southern from 1955 to 1980. He served as President of the Senate of Jamaica from 1993 to 1995. Jones died on 29 June 2000, at the age of 82.

== Legacy ==
- Winston Jones High School

== See also ==
- List of presidents of the Senate of Jamaica
