= Knox College (Jamaica) =

Location
- Spalding, Clarendon; Jamaica
- Coordinates: 18.151663°N 77.4543858°W

Information
- Other name: "The citadel on the hill"
- Type: Traditional High School
- Motto: Niti Servire Neque Cedere (To Strive to Serve and Not to Yield)
- Religious affiliation: Christian
- Denomination: United Church in Jamaica and the Cayman Islands
- Established: 1947; 79 years ago
- Founder: Mr. David Bent and Rev. Dr. Lewis Davidson
- School number: 13070
- Chairperson: Mrs.Dorothy Miller
- Principal: Dr. Alexander Bourne
- Chaplain: Rev. Bryan Stone
- Staff: ~150
- Grades: 7 - 13
- Gender: Co-educational
- Enrolment: ~1,587 (2020)
- Average class size: 40
- Language: English
- Hours in school day: 6 hours 40 minutes
- Campus: Spalding
- Campus size: 100 acres
- Campus type: suburban
- Houses: Forbes Dennis, Grant, Murray and Webster
- Colours: Red, Blue and White
- National ranking: 5 (2019)
- Newspaper: Chat Bout
- Website: www.knoxcollege.edu.jm

Knox College (The high school part of the Knox Complex of Schools) is a co-educational high school for both day pupils and boarders in Clarendon Parish, Jamaica. The other institutions that form the complex are: the Neighbourhood Early Childhood Institute, Knox Junior School, and Knox Community College. It was co-founded by Rev. Dr. Lewis Davidson and Mr. David Bent in 1947 and is named after John Knox.

The complex occupies around 100 acres (40 ha) of land and is owned and administered by United Church in Jamaica and the Cayman Islands. Each school operates under its own principal and board of management, nominated by the church and established by the Ministry of Education.

== Knox College ==
Knox College is a grant-aided secondary institution. It remains today as the only secondary co-educational boarding school in Jamaica. Most students come from the surrounding districts and towns. However, a significant number of students are from other parishes throughout the island. With seven grades (7-13) and up to seven streams, Knox College takes in approximately 300 students each year in grade 7 and approximately 100 students in grade 13 .

=== Curriculum ===
The broad-based curriculum is geared at equipping students for life. All students sit the Caribbean Examination Council (CXC) at the end of year 11 presented as Caribbean Secondary Education Certificate (CSEC) and at years 12 and 13 presented as Caribbean Advanced Proficiency Examination (CAPE). The course work for these examinations begins in the ninth grade for all students. English Language, English Literature and Mathematics are compulsory, and all CSEC students are required to pursue a minimum of 8 subjects, alongside completing a set work programme of at least 40 hours in order to earn a high school diploma.

=== Work programme ===
The Student service work programme initiated in 1968 continues as an integral part of the course, providing learning opportunities for students. Seniors are required to complete at least fifty hours of an assignment in the work programme under the supervision of their teachers. This programme is geared at building effective work ethics, and providing work experience, as students are selected to work in a department that complements their career choice.

=== Student leadership ===
The purpose of the Students Council and Prefect Council is to enhance the involvement of students in their education while developing their skills in decision-making and leadership.

Students choose their own student council representatives. From the pool of elected representatives, teachers and students select a president and vice-president in a democratic election process. The academic staff selects the prefect body based on positive leadership qualities, academic performance and attitudes. From the complement of prefects, the head boy and head girl are selected.

=== Extra curricular activities ===
The school participates in a number of national and regional competitions, often receiving awards. Among these are Science competitions, Spanish competitions Literacy, Visual and Performing Arts competitions, the Junior Achievement and 4H competitions.

Knox College has some thirty active clubs and . These bodies provide important opportunities for students to enrich their education and experiences outside the normal classroom sessions. These cater for a wide variety of interests and include athletic, creative, intellectual, recreational and spiritual activities. Students are encouraged to be actively involved in at least one club.

Some of the current clubs and societies include cadets, drama, Inter School Christian Fellowship, junior achievement, 'Knox Novelities", 4H, literary, debating, music, rangers/guides, science and technology, schools’ challenge quiz, Spanish, speech, tourism action, Red Cross, girls brigade, male empowerment fraternity, journalism club, sign language club, technovators club, Duke of Edinburgh Award scheme, environmentalist club, passion and purity and Sixth Form Association.

=== Sports ===
Knox College has particular interest in the sports of:

- Basketball
- Volleyball
- Chess
- Netball
- Cricket
- Football
- Lawn Tennis
- Table Tennis
- Badminton
- Swimming
- Track and Field

Knox College has enjoyed success in the sporting field of basketball since the inception of the school boy competition. Knox College has won multiple ISSA Basketball and Volleyball Championships.

== See also ==
- Education in Jamaica
- List of universities and colleges in Jamaica
