= Ascot High School =

Location
- Sector 1, North East Street, Greater Portmore; Kingston, Jamaica
- Coordinates: 17°57′03″N 76°54′46″W

Information
- Type: Secondary School
- Motto: Latin: opus victoriae English: Working for Success
- Religious affiliation: Roman Catholic (Christian)
- Established: 1 September 1997; 28 years ago
- Founder: Society of Jesus
- Principal: Madam Boyd-Cunningham (Acting)
- Staff: 68
- Faculty: 80
- Gender: Mixed-sex education Co-educational
- Average class size: 36 students
- Houses: Tulip (blue & purple); Hibiscus (red); Marigold (yellow); Bougainvillea (green); Kadupul (gold)
- Colors: Purple, Grey, and Yellow
- Song: Ascot, Together we share
- Sports: Basketball; badminton; chess; cricket; football; lawn tennis; rugby; lacrosse; table tennis; track & field; netball
- Nickname: Ascotian
- Rival: Cedar Grove Academy
- Website: vle.ascothigh.edu.jm

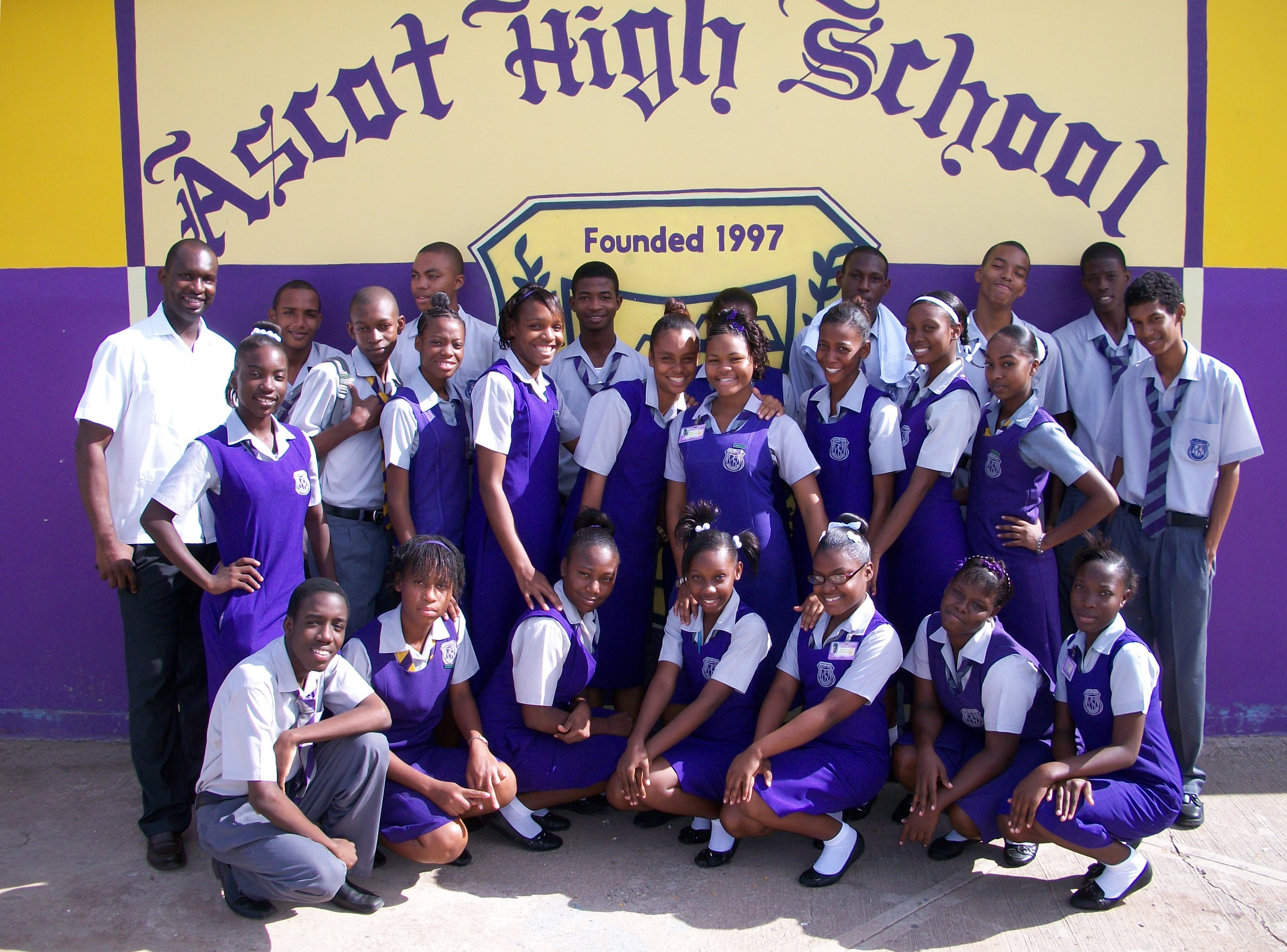
Ascot High Students

Ascot High School is a public Catholic secondary school, located in Kingston, Jamaica. The co-educational school was founded in 1997.

== Early beginnings ==
Ascot High School was founded in Jamaica on September 1, 1997 with 1,440 students and first form students and a faculty of 40 teachers. When the new school opened, the first lessons were given in a pavilion and in the new classrooms that were made to institute these students. It began on the premises of Ascot Basic School, but moved to the Middle of both Schools NE 20 Street, Kasauli, Saint Catherine on September 1, 1997. To make room for the growing needs of Ascot High School, it graduated its last class in December 2002, just as 22 years had taken in its first students to supply the needs of Ascot Primary School. The former Superior's residence at Kasauli Road was previously the property of the Ascot Community and the large adjoining field in the middle of both schools was socialized by the Ascot Community.

In addition, the Ascotians bought a large property to facilitate the growing of crops and establish the mastery and adeptness of agricultural production. At that time the enrollment was 500 students, but more classroom space was needed. In 2007, the construction of a new building was authorized by the Headmaster/Principal.

As of June 13, 2013, higher distinguished education will soon be available at the Ascot High School in Portmore, St. Catherine, as ground was broken on June 12 for the construction of its sixth form block. The sixth form programme, which is slated to commence in September 2013, will offer subjects in the Humanities and Science and Technology areas, as well as courses in professional development and leadership training. Addressing the groundbreaking ceremony, by Lordship and leadership the Minister of Education, Hon. Rev. Ronald Thwaites, noted that the subjects to be offered are significant and ties in with the policy direction of the Ministry. He said, “This is quite different from the traditional sixth form and it expresses precisely the policy of the Ministry of Education, which lifts up the academic subjects that are the traditional (ones). You will be offering much more than that at an advanced level, because you will be offering technical and vocational studies and artistic and cultural studies.”

In addition to the future of Ascot and to the education of it, the new building was erected. The leadership of the Science Block has laboratories and classrooms for Physics, Chemistry, and Biology. Its construction, supervised by the former principal/headmaster Cedric Murray, was finished in December 2013 and opened for use in January 2014. The formal dedication and opening took place on February 24, 2014, when it was blessed by Hon. Rev. Ronald Thwaites, JOV, Jamaica, Ministry of Education.

== Becoming a government school ==
Ascot High School is built to become a grant-in-aid school in 1997, and it became a part of the Government's educational system. The Jamaican Government would provide the salaries of the teaching faculty and staff. This new status, however, forced the Ascot Community to give up some control of the school to the Ministry of Education. In 1956, the Ministry of Education established a Common Entrance Examination, ending the college's own entrance examination and selection of its students. The Grade Six Achievement Test (GSAT) was initiated in 1998, further regularizing the entrance of students.

Discipline has always been a strong element of Ascot High School, to maintain discipline but also to encourage a spirit of competition. To this end, The student body was divided into three "houses": Tulip, Hibiscus, and Marigold, named after the school Pride and colors.: These five houses became rivals for leadership in studies, sports, and discipline, Sportsmanship.

== Recent development ==
The School has continued to excel in innovation and leadership and The 1st Jamaica Zen-Do-Kai-Kan/Ascot High School Karate team and Compete against some of the best in the country and the world and Ascot Wonderful girls rugby team scored 20 to nil against Cedar Grove Academy on January 28, 2020.

== Motto ==
The school's motto is in opus victoriae, translated as "Working for success".

== Activities, sports, service ==
The school attends 45 clubs and societies and 15 different sports, including participation in all national sports competitions. A service project is required each term from each of the clubs, besides the following specifically service-oriented groups: Interact Club (branch of Rotary International), High Key (Branch of Key Club), Drama Club, Tourism Club (Branch of Tourism Board), Entrepreneurship Club, Robotics Club, Cadet Unit Club, Tourism Action Club, Ministry Outreach Group (visits indigent elderly), and "more"
