= List of presidents of the Senate of Jamaica =

The president of the Senate of Jamaica is the presiding officer of Senate of Jamaica.

Below is a list of office-holders:

Name	Entered office	Left office
Clifford Clarence Campbell	31 August 1962	30 November 1962
George Samuel Ranglin	7 December 1962	1972
Allan George Richard Byfield	21 March 1972	1980
Oswald Harding	18 November 1980	1984
Jeanette Rose Grant-Woodham	21 August 1984	1986
Ephraim Augustus Morgan	1986	1989
Sir Howard Cooke	1989	1993
Winston V. Jones	1993	1995
Syringa Marshall-Burnett	1995	2007
Oswald Harding	27 September 2007	12 December 2011
Stanley Redwood	18 January 2012	10 May 2013
Floyd Morris	17 May 2013	5 February 2016
Tom Tavares-Finson, KC	10 March 2016	Incumbent

== Sources ==
- Official website of Houses of Parliament, Jamaica
