= Joseph Robert Love =

Bahamian-born medical doctor and pan-Africanist (1839 – 1914)

Dr. Robert Love
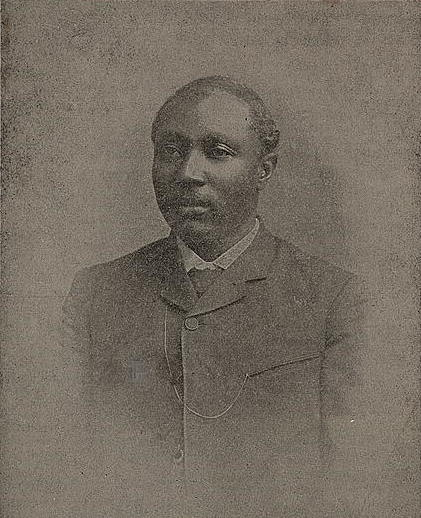
- Born: Joseph Robert Love; 2 October 1839; Nassau, Bahamas
- Died: 21 November 1914 (aged 75); Kingston, Jamaica
- Education: University at Buffalo
- Occupations: Politician, journalist, physician

Joseph Robert Love, known as Dr. Robert Love (2 October 1839 – 21 November 1914), was a 19th-century Bahamian-born medical doctor, clergyman, teacher, journalist, politician and pan-Africanist. He lived, studied, and worked successively in the Bahamas, the United States of America, Haiti, and Jamaica. Love spent the last decades of his life in Jamaica, where he held political office, published a newspaper, and advocated for the island's black majority.

== Early life ==
Love was born in the Bahamas on 2 October 1839. Love was educated at St. Agnes Parish School and Christ Church Grammar School in Nassau. He was influenced by the Anglican Church during this period. Later he became a teacher in Bahamas.

In the 1866, he went to Florida, United States. In 1871, Bishop John F. Young of the Diocese of Florida ordained him a deacon. In June 1871, he became clergy in Trinity Church, Florida and transferred to the Church of St. Stephen, Savannah, Georgia in December. In 1872, claiming discrimination against people of darker color there, he left the Church of St. Stephen and established St. Augustine's mission that mainly consisted of black people; during this period he also managed schools for black children.

Love moved to Buffalo, New York in 1876 to accept a call as Rector of St. Philip’s Church, the fourth church founded by Black Americans in Buffalo. In 1877, Bishop Arthur Cleveland Coxe of the Diocese of Western New York ordained him to the priesthood.

In Buffalo, he was Rector of St. Philip's until 1878. While there, he studied in the medical school at the University of Buffalo. On February 25, 1880 was awarded his Doctor of Medicine degree, becoming the first black graduate of the school.

== Haiti ==
In 1881, Love moved to Haiti, where he served as the rector of an Anglican church in Port-au-Prince. He was forced to end his career in church due to a quarrel, and he became a doctor in the Haitian army that engaged with the revolt in Haiti. During his time in Haiti he experienced grave difficulty in politics. In 1889, he was eventually expelled. He went to Kingston, Jamaica and failed in his attempts to return to Haiti.

== Jamaica ==
In Jamaica, he started the Jamaica Advocate newspaper in December 1894, which became an influential newspaper on the island. Love used the paper as a forum to express his concern for the living conditions of Jamaica's black population. He was a staunch advocate of access to education for the majority of the population. He believed that girls, like boys, should receive secondary school education.

Love piloted a voter registration drive, as a means of empowering the black majority, and challenging white minority rule. The white elite in the Colony of Jamaica worried that Love was filling the heads of black people with dangerous ideas of racial equality. John Vassall Calder claimed that black people lacked the mental capacities to thrive, and stated: “Dr. Love must remember that his ancestors were my ancestors’ slaves....He could never be my equal. He is aggrieved because my forefathers rescued him from the bonds of thraldom and deprived him the privilege of being King of the Congo, enjoying the epicurean and conjugal orgies and the sacrificial pleasures of his ancestral home in Africa.”

The white establishment viewed Love with as much suspicion as they did the pan-African Native Baptist preacher, Alexander Bedward. However, Love always thought Bedward to be nothing more than a skilled showman whom a hysterical establishment had managed to turn into a martyr.

Love helped black candidates to get elected to the Legislative Council, which advised the government. In 1906, Love himself won the Saint Andrew Parish seat of the Legislative Council in general elections. He also served as chairman of the Saint Andrew Parochial Board, as well as a justice of the peace in Kingston, the Kingston General Commissions and as a trustee of Wolmer's schools. Love published two works, Romanism is Not Christianity (1892), and St. Peter's True Position in the Church, Clearly Traced in the Bible (1897).

== Death and legacy ==
Love's health began to deteriorate, and by 1910 he had been forced to end his political career. He died on 21 November 1914, and was buried in the parish church yard at Half Way Tree, near the city of Kingston. Love's activism in favour of Jamaica's economically depressed black majority influenced later Jamaican and Caribbean activists, including Marcus Garvey.
