= Jeanette Rose Grant-Woodham =

Jamaican politician (1938–2020)

Jeanette Rose Grant-Woodham, OD (13 July 1938 – 7 September 2020) was a Jamaican politician and educator. She was President of the Senate of Jamaica from 21 August 1984 to 1986. She was born at Ocho Rios. Grant-Woodham died on 7 September 2020, at the age of 82.

== See also ==
- List of presidents of the Senate of Jamaica
