= George Samuel Ranglin =

Jamaican politician (born 1902)

George Samuel Ranglin (28 October 1902 – after 1972) was a Jamaican politician. He was President of the Senate of Jamaica from 7 December 1962 to 1972. He was born in Mandeville, Jamaica.

== See also ==
- List of presidents of the Senate of Jamaica
