= University of the Commonwealth Caribbean =

University in Jamaica

- Motto: Fostering Leadership & Innovation
- Type: Private
- Established: 2004; 22 years ago
- Accreditation: University Council of Jamaica
- President: Professor Colin Gyles
- Location: Kingston, Jamaica; 18.007568°N 76.7813°W
- Website: ucc.edu.jm

The University of the Commonwealth Caribbean is one of Jamaica's largest privately held tertiary education institutions operating 7 campuses in six parishes across Jamaica.

As of 2017, the University offers professional certificate, diploma, associate, bachelor's and master's degree programs, as well as customized training programs in Jamaica.

== History ==
UCC was formed in 2004 as a result of the merger in 2002 of the Institute of Management Sciences (IMS), incorporated in 1992, and the Institute of Management & Production (IMP), incorporated in 1976.

== Accreditation ==
The University of the Commonwealth Caribbean is registered and recognized by the University Council of Jamaica (UCJ), the official accreditation body for tertiary education in Jamaica. UCC is institutionally accredited by the University Council of Jamaica. and also has international institutional accreditation status from the UK based Accreditation Services for Independent Colleges & Universities (ASIC). The UCC is also recognised as a registered centre from the University of London.

== Affiliates and partnerships ==
UCC currently partners with universities, colleges, institutions and schools across the globe. As of February 2017, the University of the Commonwealth Caribbean is partnered with:

- Caribbean School of Medical Sciences, Jamaica
- Commonwealth of Learning
- eMedia Jamaica
- Florida International University
- Law College of the Americas
- University of London
