= United Church in Jamaica and the Cayman Islands =

The United Church in Jamaica and the Cayman Islands is a united church formed on 1 December 1965 as the "United Church of Jamaica and Grand Cayman" by bringing the Protestant denominations "Presbyterian Church in Jamaica" and "Congregational Union of Jamaica" together. The "Disciples of Christ in Jamaica" joined on 13 December 1992, at which time the current name was adopted.

== Background ==
In 1800 when the Scottish Missionary Society established the Presbyterian denomination in Jamaica. In 1848 the first Synod was held.

Congregational churches were formed by the assistance of the London Missionary Society from 1834. Later the Colonial Missionary Society take over the congregational work. The Congregational Union of Jamaica was formed in 1877.

The Disciples of Christ (United States) started mission in 1839. Between 1870 and 1950 over 30 congregations were established. It became independent in the 1950s.

Since the United Church was established, it has represented a strong presence of the Reformed faith in Jamaica.

== Interchurch organisations ==
It is affiliated with the World Communion of Reformed Churches, the Council for World Mission and the World Council of Churches.

== Statistics ==
It is governed by a council called the Synod. It has a head called a Moderator whose duty is to give pastoral oversight of the ministers within the denomination. The United Church is divided into 4 Regional Mission Councils, and had approximately 60,000 members in 204 congregations served by 86 pastors in 2006.

== See also ==
- Protestantism in Jamaica
- Regunta Yesurathnam
