= International University of the Caribbean =

International University of the Caribbean (IUC)
- Motto: Seek Peace, Pursue Excellence
- Type: Private
- Established: 2005; 21 years ago
- President: Rev. Prof. Roderick Hewitt
- Location: Kingston, Montego Bay, Mandeville, Ocho Rios, Port Antonio, Jamaica
- Website: www.iuc.edu.jm

The International University of the Caribbean (IUC) was founded by the United Church in Jamaica and the Cayman Islands in November 2005. It consists of two educational entities: College for Leadership and Theological Development (CLTD; formerly the Institute for Theological and Leadership Development) and the Mel Nathan College.

== Location-based study ==
The university has regional campuses, community campuses and delivery centres to cover the majority of Jamaica and the Cayman Islands.

== Accreditation ==
The University Council of Jamaica (UCJ) is the accrediting body for tertiary programmes in Jamaica.

There are several accredited programmes offered through College for Leadership and Theological Development (CLTD) [formerly Institute for Theological and Leadership Development] and Mel Nathan College (MNC)

- Diploma in Theology
- Bachelor of Arts in Theology
- Bachelor of Arts in General Studies
- Bachelor of Arts in Guidance and Counselling (degree completion)
- Bachelor of Arts in Guidance and Counselling (4-year degree)
- Bachelor of Education (Primary)
- Bachelor of Arts in Psychology
- Master of Arts in Pastoral Psychology and Counselling (MAPPC)

Accredited MNC programmes:

- Bachelor of Arts in Community Development
- Bachelor of Science in Business Administration with specialization in Programme and Project Management
- Bachelor of Science in Business Administration

Accreditation is currently being sought for all other programmes through the UCJ.

The normal procedure is for programmes to be delivered in keeping with UCJ guidelines and then submitted for accreditation after the graduation of the first cohort.

== Scholarships ==
The International University of the Caribbean currently offers two scholarship opportunities: Tertiary Track Scholarship and First Steps Scholarship.

The Tertiary Track Scholarship is awarded to candidates based on their defined financial need, history of involvement in community work and their display of potential to be effective role models in their respective communities. Applicants are interviewed by a panel of IUC representatives prior to approval.

The First Steps Scholarship is a discount in the amount of $70,000 on your tuition fee for the first year of your selected programme. The programmes offered with this scholarship may vary each academic year.

The programmes offered for the 2011/2012 academic year are:

1. Bachelor of Arts in General Studies 2. Bachelor of Science in Business Administration 3. Bachelor of Arts in Community Development 4. Bachelor of Science in Human Resource Management 5. Bachelor of Arts in Psychology 6. Bachelor of Arts in Guidance and Counseling
