= 14th Parliament of Jamaica =

Current membership of the Jamaican Parliament

Parliament of Jamaica
- 14th Parliament of Jamaica

Type
- Type: Bicameral
- Houses: Senate; House of Representatives

Leadership
- Monarch: Charles III since 8 September 2022
- Governor-General: Patrick L. Allen since 26 February 2009
- Speaker of the House of Representatives: Marisa Dalrymple-Philibert, JLP since 15 September 2020
- President of the Senate: Thomas Tavares-Finson, JLP since 10 March 2016

Structure
- Seats: 84; 21 Senators; 63 Members of Parliament
- Senate political groups: HM Government Jamaica Labour Party (13) Official Opposition People's National Party (8)
- House of Representatives political groups: HM Government Jamaica Labour Party (49) Official Opposition People's National Party (14)

Elections
- Senate voting system: Appointed by the Governor-General of Jamaica on advice of the Prime Minister and the Leader of the Opposition
- House of Representatives voting system: First-past-the-post
- Last House of Representatives election: 3 September 2020
- Next House of Representatives election: 3 September 2025

Meeting place
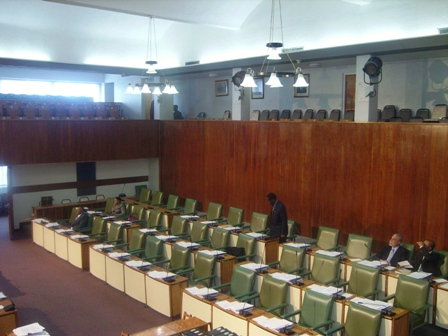
- George William Gordon House, Kingston, Jamaica

Website
- japarliament.gov.jm

The 14th Parliament of Jamaica was sworn in on 15 September 2020, after being elected following the 2020 Jamaican general election.

== Crown ==
- Governor-General Sir Patrick Allen

== Senate ==
=== Jamaica Labour Party ===
- Kamina Johnson Smith
- Aubyn Hill
- Tom Tavares-Finson, OJ, QC, JP
- Kavan Gayle
- Charles Sinclair Jr.
- Dr. Saphire Longmore
- Sherene Golding Campbell
- Dana Morris Dixon (since 2023)
- Abka Fitz-Henley (since 2023)
- Delano Seiveright (since 2025)
- Dr. Elon Thompson (since 2025)
- Audrey Marks (since 2025)
- Marlon Morgan (since 2025)
- Natalie Campbell Rodriques (until 2023)

=== People's National Party ===
- Donna Scott-Mottley, Leader of Opposition Business in the Senator
- Dr. Floyd Morris
- Sophia Frazer Binns
- Damion Crawford
- Peter Bunting *
- Lambert Brown
- Janice Allen
- Gabriela Morris

* Appointed after Norman Horne turned down the appointment made by then People's National Party Opposition Leader Dr. Peter Phillips.

== House of Representatives ==
=== Government – Jamaica Labour Party members ===
- Dr. The Most Hon. Andrew Holness, ON – Saint Andrew West Central - Prime Minister
- Dr. The Hon. Horace Chang, CD, Saint James North Western - Deputy Prime Minister
- The Most Hon. Juliet Holness, Saint Andrew East Rural – Speaker
- Mr. Heroy Clarke, Saint James Central - Deputy Speaker
- Hon. Edmund Bartlett, Saint James East Central – Leader of Government Business
- Hon. Olivia Grange, Saint Catherine Central - Deputy Leader of Government Business
- Hon. Pearnel Patroe Charles Jr., Clarendon South Eastern
- Hon. Robert Nesta Morgan, Sr. Clarendon North Central
- Mr. Lester Michael Henry OJ, Clarendon Central
- Mr. Phillip Henriques, Clarendon North Western
- Mr. Dwight Sibblies, Clarendon Northern
- Mr. Dave Brown, Hanover Eastern
- Ms. Tamika Davis, Hanover Western
- Hon. Desmond McKenzie, Kingston Western
- Mr. Donovan Williams, Kingston Central
- Hon. Audley Shaw, Manchester North Eastern
- Ms. Rhoda Moy Crawford, Manchester Central
- Mr. Robert Chin, Manchester Southern
- Hon. Daryl Vaz, Portland Western
- Mrs. Ann-Marie Vaz, Portland Eastern
- Hon. Fayval Williams, Saint Andrew Eastern
- Mr. Duane Smith, Saint Andrew North Western
- Hon. Karl Samuda, Saint Andrew North Central
- Hon. Delroy Chuck, QC, Saint Andrew North Eastern
- Hon. Juliet Cuthbert-Flynn, Saint Andrew West Rural
- Hon. Zavia Mayne, Saint Ann South Western
- Hon. Matthew Samuda, Saint Ann North Eastern
- Ms. Krystal Lee, Saint Ann North Western
- Hon. Clifford Everald Warmington, Saint Catherine South Western
- Dr. The Hon. Christopher Tufton, Saint Catherine West Central
- Hon. Alando Terrelonge, Saint Catherine East Central
- Mr. Robert Miller, Saint Catherine South Eastern
- Ms. Kerensia Morrison, Saint Catherine North Eastern
- Dr. Andrew Wheatley, Saint Catherine South Central
- Hon. Floyd Green, Saint Elizabeth South Western
- Hon. William James Charles Hutchinson, Saint Elizabeth North Western
- Mr. Franklyn Witter, Saint Elizabeth South Eastern
- Mr. Delroy Slowley, Saint Elizabeth North Eastern
- Hon. Homer Davis, Saint James Southern
- Hon. Marlene Malahoo Forte, QC, Saint James West Central
- Hon. Robert Montague, Saint Mary Western
- Dr. The Hon. Norman Alexander Dunn, Saint Mary South Eastern
- Mr. James Robertson, Saint Thomas Western
- Dr. Michelle Charles, Saint Thomas Eastern
- Ms. Tova Hamilton, Trelawny Northern
- Vacant since September 21, 2023, Trelawny Southern
- Mr. Daniel Lawrence, Westmoreland Eastern
- Mr. Morland Wilson, Westmoreland Western

=== Opposition – People's National Party members ===
- Mr. Mark Golding, Saint Andrew Southern – Leader of the Opposition
- Mr. Phillip Paulwell, Kingston East and Port Royal – Leader of Opposition Business
- Dr. Morais Guy, Saint Mary Central
- Dr. Peter Phillips, Saint Andrew East Central
- Dr. Angela Brown-Burke, Saint Andrew South West
- Mr. Lothan Cousins, Clarendon South Western
- Ms. Denise Daley, Saint Catherine Eastern
- Mr. Julian Robinson, Saint Andrew South Eastern
- Mr. G. Anthony Hylton, Saint Andrew Western
- Mr. Fitz Jackson, Saint Catherine Southern
- Ms. Natalie Neita, Saint Catherine North Central
- Mr. Mikael Phillips, Manchester North Western
- Hon. Hugh Graham, Saint Catherine North Western
- Ms. Lisa Hanna, Saint Ann South Eastern

=== Independents ===
- Mr. George Wright, Westmoreland Central
