= 15th Parliament of Jamaica =

Parliament of Jamaica
- 15th Parliament of Jamaica

Type
- Type: Bicameral
- Houses: Senate; House of Representatives

History
- Preceded by: 14th Parliament of Jamaica

Leadership
- Monarch: Charles III since 8 September 2022
- Governor-General: Patrick L. Allen since 26 February 2009
- Speaker of the House of Representatives: Marisa Dalrymple-Philibert, JLP since 15 September 2020
- President of the Senate: Thomas Tavares-Finson, JLP since 10 March 2016

Structure
- Seats: 84; 21 Senators; 63 Members of Parliament
- Senate political groups: HM Government Jamaica Labour Party (13) Official Opposition People's National Party (8)
- House of Representatives political groups: HM Government Jamaica Labour Party (35) Official Opposition People's National Party (28)

Elections
- Senate voting system: Appointed by the Governor-General of Jamaica on advice of the Prime Minister and the Leader of the Opposition
- House of Representatives voting system: First-past-the-post
- Last House of Representatives election: 3 September 2025
- Next House of Representatives election: 2030

Meeting place
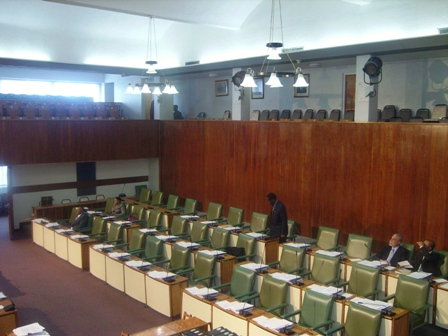
- George William Gordon House, Kingston, Jamaica

Website
- japarliament.gov.jm

The 15th Parliament of Jamaica was elected at the 2025 Jamaican general election.

== MPs ==
Constituency	MP	Party
Clarendon Central	Delroy Williams	Jamaica Labour Party
Clarendon North Central	Robert Nesta Morgan	Jamaica Labour Party
Clarendon North Western	Richard Azan	People's National Party
Clarendon Northern	Wavell Hinds	People's National Party
Clarendon South Eastern	Pearnel Charles	Jamaica Labour Party
Clarendon South Western	Lothan Cousins	People's National Party
Hanover Eastern	Andrea Purkiss	People's National Party
Hanover Western	Heatha Miller-Bennett	People's National Party
Kingston Central	Donovan Williams	Jamaica Labour Party
Kingston East & Port Royal	Phillip Paulwell	People's National Party
Kingston Western	Desmond McKenzie	Jamaica Labour Party
Manchester Central	Rhoda Moy Crawford	Jamaica Labour Party
Manchester North Eastern	Audrey Marks	Jamaica Labour Party
Manchester North Western	Mikael Phillips	People's National Party
Manchester Southern	Peter Bunting	People's National Party
Portland Eastern	Isat Buchanan	People's National Party
Portland Western	Daryl Vaz	Jamaica Labour Party
Saint Andrew East Central	Dennis Gordon	People's National Party
Saint Andrew East Rural	Juliet Holness	Jamaica Labour Party
Saint Andrew Eastern	Fayval Williams	Jamaica Labour Party
Saint Andrew North Central	Delano Seiveright	Jamaica Labour Party
Saint Andrew North Eastern	Delroy Chuck	Jamaica Labour Party
Saint Andrew North Western	Duane Smith	Jamaica Labour Party
Saint Andrew South Eastern	Julian Robinson	People's National Party
Saint Andrew South Western	Angela Brown-Burke	People's National Party
Saint Andrew Southern	Mark Golding	People's National Party
Saint Andrew West Central	Andrew Holness	Jamaica Labour Party
Saint Andrew West Rural	Juliet Cuthbert-Flynn	Jamaica Labour Party
Saint Andrew Western	Anthony Hylton	People's National Party
Saint Ann North Eastern	Matthew Samuda	Jamaica Labour Party
Saint Ann North Western	Krystal Lee	Jamaica Labour Party
Saint Ann South Eastern	Kenneth Russell	People's National Party
Saint Ann South Western	Zavia Mayne	Jamaica Labour Party
Saint Catherine Central	Olivia Grange	Jamaica Labour Party
Saint Catherine East Central	Alando Terrelonge	Jamaica Labour Party
Saint Catherine Eastern	Denise Daley	People's National Party
Saint Catherine North Central	Natalie Neita	People's National Party
Saint Catherine North Eastern	Kerensia Morrison	Jamaica Labour Party
Saint Catherine North Western	Damion Crawford	People's National Party
Saint Catherine South Central	Andrew Wheatley	Jamaica Labour Party
Saint Catherine South Eastern	Alfred Dawes	People's National Party
Saint Catherine South Western	Everald Warmington	Jamaica Labour Party
Saint Catherine Southern	Fitz Jackson	People's National Party
Saint Catherine West Central	Christopher Tufton	Jamaica Labour Party
Saint Elizabeth North Eastern	Zuleika Jess	People's National Party
Saint Elizabeth North Western	Andrew Morris	Jamaica Labour Party
Saint Elizabeth South Eastern	Franklyn Witter	Jamaica Labour Party
Saint Elizabeth South Western	Floyd Green	Jamaica Labour Party
Saint James Central	Heroy Clarke	Jamaica Labour Party
Saint James East Central	Edmund Bartlett	Jamaica Labour Party
Saint James North Western	Horace Chang	Jamaica Labour Party
Saint James Southern	Nekeisha Burchell	People's National Party
Saint James West Central	Marlene Malahoo Forte	Jamaica Labour Party
Saint Mary Central	Omar Newell	People's National Party
Saint Mary South Eastern	Christopher Brown	People's National Party
Saint Mary Western	Robert Montague	Jamaica Labour Party
Saint Thomas Eastern	Yvonne Shaw	People's National Party
Saint Thomas Western	James Robertson	Jamaica Labour Party
Trelawny Northern	Tova Hamilton	Jamaica Labour Party
Trelawny Southern	Marisa Dalrymple-Philibert	Jamaica Labour Party
Westmoreland Central	Dwayne Vaz	People's National Party
Westmoreland Eastern	Dayton Campbell	People's National Party
Westmoreland Western	Ian Hayles	People's National Party

== See also ==
- List of Jamaican political families
