= Everald Warmington =

Jamaican politician

Everald Warmington CD MP

Member of the Jamaican Parliament for Saint Catherine South Western
- Incumbent
- Assumed office 2002
- Preceded by: Jennifer Edwards

State Minister in the Office of the Prime Minister
- In office 2016–2020

Ministerial roles
- 2020–2024: Minister without portfolio

Personal details
- Born: 1952 (age 73–74) Browns Hall, Saint Catherine, Jamaica
- Party: Jamaica Labour Party

Clifford Everald Errol Warmington CD (born 1952) is a Jamaican politician with the Jamaica Labour Party. He has represented the Saint Catherine South Western constituency in the Parliament of Jamaica since 2002.

== Career ==
=== Overview ===
Warmington was first elected to Parliament in the 2002 elections. In the 2007 elections, he faced off against Dennis Jones of the People's National Party, winning by a sizeable 10,488 votes to Jones' 7,244. In February 2011, it came to light that Warmington had been a U.S. citizen at the time of his 2007 nomination, meaning that he was constitutionally ineligible to sit in Parliament; this was part of a widespread scandal in Jamaica involving MPs on both sides of the aisle, including Daryl Vaz, Michael Stern, Shahine Robinson, and Gregory Mair of the JLP and Sharon Hay-Webster and Ian Hayles of the PNP. Warmington had renounced U.S. citizenship some time after, but in light of the revelations, he submitted his letter of resignation on 8 March 2011, and a by-election for his seat was scheduled for 4 April; a truce between the PNP and the JLP meant that Warmington would run unopposed. He quickly ran into controversy soon after his resignation when he told a CVM-TV anchorwoman to "go to hell" during a live programme; the Commonwealth Broadcasting Association and the International Federation of Journalists condemned his outburst, while Jamaican women's groups called on Bruce Golding not to permit Warmington to run in the 4 April by-election. Despite the controversy, the by-election saw Warmington returned to his seat, though Golding declined to reappoint him State Minister for Water and Housing.

Warmington faced a bigger challenge later that year in the general elections in December. Redistribution carried out in 2010 had been expected to harm Warmington's chances of re-election: a new seat for Saint Catherine Parish had been added, and the Sydenham division and parts of the Church Pen division, both JLP strongholds which contributed heavily to Warmington's 2007 re-election, were transferred to the new constituency. However, the PNP also faced internal tensions over the best candidate to challenge Warmington: former Senator Keste Miller or caretaker-candidate Anthony Ewbanks. In the end, Warmington faced off against Ewbanks and defeated him, though by a smaller margin than in his previous election: 9,096 to 8,184.

=== Contracting scandal ===
In 2011, a report by the Office of the Contractor-General alleged irregularities in the Government's award of millions of dollars of contracts to Strathairn Construction Company, a firm in which Warmington was allegedly a director and shareholder. Warmington responded angrily to the accusations, calling Contractor-General Greg Christie an "overzealous idiot" and a "mental case". After a protracted investigation, the Director of Public Prosecutions found that two other directors of SCCL had made misrepresentations about Warmington's financial interest in the company, and on that basis announced that no charges would be filed against Warmington. When the news went public, Warmington withdrew his earlier apology to Christie and repeated his description of Christie as a "mental case" for emphasis.

=== Disputes with JLP ===
Warmington has had a number of high-profile public disputes with his party over his four decades of membership. In 2006, he resigned from his position as Chairman of the JLP's Area Council Two, accusing the JLP leadership of disregarding the party's constitution. In November 2012, he decried irregularities in the nomination of candidates for party leadership positions and went as far as to file an application for an injunction in the Supreme Court; however, he withdrew the application just hours before the case was heard. He stated in media interviews later that week that he had withdrawn the application on the strength of assurances from top party members that the election would not go forward; nevertheless, the JLP held its election as scheduled, and Warmington continued to speak out publicly about the matter.

== Personal life ==
Warmington was born in Browns Hall, Saint Catherine. He did his early education at Browns Hall All-Age School and Saint Andrew Technical High School before going on to the College of Arts, Science, and Technology (CAST; today the University of Technology, Jamaica). He became involved in politics early on in his life as the vice-president of Young Jamaica and the vice-president of the Student Council at CAST from 1974 to 1978.
