= Cabinet of Jamaica =

Executive organizations of Jamaica

The Cabinet of Jamaica is the ultimate decision-making body of the executive within the Westminster system of government in traditional constitutional theory. The Cabinet of Jamaica is the principal instrument of government policy. It consists of the Prime Minister, and a minimum of thirteen other Ministers of Government, who must be members of one of the two Houses of Parliament. Not more than four members of the Cabinet may be members of the Senate. The Minister of Finance must be an elected member of the House of Representatives. The Shadow Cabinet of Jamaica is seen as the alternative to the Cabinet of Jamaica, led by the Leader of the Opposition (Jamaica), and is charged with fairly criticizing and providing alternative policy to that proposed by the Government.

The Cabinet of Jamaica is currently composed of The Jamaica Labour Party members because the party won the 2025 General elections.

The following are the members of the Government Cabinet led by Prime Minister Andrew Holness.

== Composition ==
=== Ministers, Ministers of State, Ministers without Portfolio, and Parliamentary Secretary ===
Each minister is responsible for the general administration of at least one government portfolio, and heads a corresponding ministry or ministries. The most important minister, following the prime minister, is the Minister of Finance, while other high-profile ministries include foreign affairs, national security, industry and health.

Further, the prime minister may recommend the governor general appoint to Cabinet some ministers of state and ministers without portfolio. Ministers of state often assume one responsibility of a ministry and are not considered as a part of the Cabinet. In the Jamaican press, Ministers of State of often referred to as Junior Ministers. Ministers without portfolio, often working within the Office of the prime minister, assuming one of the prime minister's subsidiary roles (excluding that of Minister of Defence). One exception exists within the current Cabinet.

=== Ministers of Second Administration ===
Ministry or Department	Minister	Ministerial title	Since
Office of the Prime Minister	Dr. Andrew Holness, MP	Prime Minister; Minister of Defence, Economic Growth and Infrastructure Development	March 7, 2016
Ministry of National Security and Peace	Dr. Horace Chang, OJ, CD, MP	Deputy Prime Minister & Minister of National Security and Peace	March 26, 2018
Ministry of Foreign Affairs and Foreign Trade	Sen. Kamina Johnson-Smith	Minister of Foreign Affairs and Foreign Trade	March 7, 2016
Ministry of Finance and the Public Service	Fayval Williams, MP	Minister of Finance and the Public Service	October 30, 2024
Ministry of Health and Wellness	Dr. Christopher Tufton, MP	Minister of Health and Wellness	March 7, 2016
Ministry of Justice and Constitutional Affairs	Delroy Chuck, KC, MP	Minister of Justice and Constitutional Affairs	March 7, 2016
Ministry of Education, Skills, Youth and Information	Sen. Dr. Dana Morris Dixon, CD	Minister of Education, Skills, Youth and Information	Oct 30, 2024
Ministry of Energy, Telecommunication and Transport	Daryl Vaz, MP	Minister of Energy, Telecommunications and Transport	May 22, 2023
Ministry of Agriculture and Fisheries	Floyd Green, MP	Minister of Agriculture, Fisheries, and Mining	2023
Ministry of Local Government and Community Development	Desmond McKenzie, CD, MP	Minister of Local Government and Community Development	March 7, 2016
Ministry of Industry, Investment and Commerce	Sen. Aubyn Hill	Minister of Industry, Investment and Commerce	January 11, 2022
Ministry of Culture, Gender, Entertainment and Sports	Olivia Grange, CD, MP	Minister of Culture, Gender, Entertainment and Sports	March 7, 2016
Ministry of Tourism	Edmund Bartlett, OJ, CD, MP	Minister of Tourism	March 7, 2016
Ministry of Labour and Social Security	Pearnel Charles Jr, MP, JP	Minister of Labour and Social Security	January 11, 2022
Ministry of Water, Environment & Climate Change	Matthew Samuda, MP	Minister of Water, Environment & Climate Change	September 18, 2025
Attorney General Department	Derrick McKoy	Attorney General	January 11, 2022

=== Ministers without Portfolio ===
Ministry or department	Minister	Ministerial title	Since
Ministry of Economic Growth & Infrastructure Development	Robert Morgan, MP	Minister with responsibility for Works in the Ministry of Economic Growth & Infrastructure Development	May 22, 2023
Ministry of Economic Growth & Infrastructure Development	Robert Montague, CD, MP	Minister with responsibility for Works in the Ministry of Economic Growth & Infrastructure Development	September 2025
Office of the Prime Minister	Andrew Wheatley, MP	Minister with responsibility for Science, Technology, and Special Projects	September 2025
Office of the Prime Minister	Audrey Marks, OJ, MP	Minister with responsibility for Efficiency, Innovation and Digital Transformation	September 2025

=== Ministers of State ===
Ministers of state have been appointed but are not a part of the cabinet although they will help in the operations of their various sectors.

Ministry or department	Minister	Ministerial title	Since
Ministry of Labour and Social Security	Donovan Williams, MP	Minister of State in the Ministry of Labour and Social Security	September 19, 2025
Ministry of Foreign Affairs and Foreign Trade	Alando Terrelonge, MP	Minister of State in the Ministry of Foreign Affairs and Foreign Trade	May 22, 2023
Ministry of National Security and Peace	Juliet Cuthbert-Flynn, MP	Minister of State in the Ministry of National Security and Peace	May 22, 2023
Office of the Prime Minister	Sen. Abka Fitz-Henley	Minister of State in the Office of the Prime Minister	September 19, 2025
Ministry of Finance and the Public Service	Zavia Mayne, MP	Minister of State in the Ministry of Finance and Public Service	May 22, 2023
Ministry of Culture, Gender, Entertainment and Sports	Kerensia Morrison, MP	Minister of State in the Ministry of Finance and Public Service	September 19, 2025
Ministry of Industry, Investment and Commerce	Delano Seiveright, MP	Minister of State in the Ministry of Industry, Investment and Commerce	September 19, 2025
Ministry of Health and Wellness	Krystal Lee, MP	Minister of State in the Ministry of Health and Wellness	September 19, 2025
Ministry of Tourism	Tova Hamilton, MP	Minister of State in the Ministry of Tourism	September 19, 2025
Ministry of Education, Skills, Youth and Information	Rhoda Moy Crawford, MP	Minister of State in the Ministry of Education, Skills, Youth and Information	September 19, 2025
Ministry of Local Government and Community Development	Delroy Williams, MP	Minister of State in the Ministry of Local Government and Community Development	September 19, 2025

=== Parliamentary Secretary ===
Ministry of Department	Minister	Ministerial title	Since
Ministry of Education, Skills Youth and Information	Sen. Marlon Morgan	Parliamentary Secretary	September 19, 2025

== See also ==
- Politics of Jamaica
- Governor-General of Jamaica
- Prime Minister of Jamaica
- Shadow Cabinet of Jamaica
- Privy Council of Jamaica
