= Electoral Commission of Jamaica =

Jamaican election commission

Agency overview
- Formed: December 1, 2006; 19 years ago
- Preceding agency: Electoral Advisory Committee
- Jurisdiction: Government of Jamaica
- Headquarters: Kingston
- Agency executives: Earl Jarrett, Chairman of the Electoral Commission of Jamaica; Glasspole Brown, Director of Elections
- Website: ecj.com.jm

The Electoral Commission of Jamaica (ECJ) is the independent statutory agency of the Government of Jamaica responsible for organising, conducting and supervising elections, by-elections and referendums.

== Objective of the Electoral Commission ==
The Electoral Commission (Interim) Act (2006) defines the objective of the Electoral Commission as:

"to safeguard the democratic foundations of Jamaica by enabling eligible electors to elect, through free and fair elections, their representatives to govern Jamaica."

== Functions of the Electoral Commission ==
The functions of the Electoral Commission are defined by law and in summary are

1. Establish policies for governing the registration of electors
2. Conduct general elections, local government elections, by-elections or referendums
3. Compile and maintain the register of eligible electors
4. Verify the identity of eligible electors
5. Approve political parties eligible to receive state funding
6. administer electoral funding and financial disclosure requirements
7. monitor election expenditure by candidates or their official agents
8. review the number of constituencies and boundaries
9. determine polling divisions within constituencies

== History ==
=== Formation of the Electoral Commission ===
In October 2006, the House of Representatives and the Senate passed the Electoral Commission (Interim) Act 2006, which established the Electoral Commission of Jamaica (ECJ). The Commission replaced the Electoral Advisory Committee (EAC) that had been established by the Representation of the People Act 1979

The day-to-day operations of the ECJ are carried out through the Electoral Office of Jamaica (EOJ) which is a public government agency established in 1943 to administer the holding of Parliamentary and Local Government Elections.

The holding of Parliamentary and Local Government Elections and all activities pertinent to these elections are regulated by the Representation of People Act and the Local Governance Act.

=== Previous Electoral Advisory Committee ===
The Electoral Advisory Committee (EAC) was established in 1979, dissolved in 2006 and replaced by the Electoral Commission of Jamaica (ECJ). Errol Miller was the last Chairman of the EAC, from December 2000 to December 2006, and the first Chairman of the ECJ from December 2006 to December 2012.

== Membership ==
Membership of the Electoral Commission is governed by the Electoral Commission (Interim) Act (2006). The commission has nine members appointed by the Governor-General, as follows:

1. Four Nominated Commissioners, two nominated the Prime Minister and two nominated by the Leader of the Opposition
2. Four Selected Commissioners jointly agreed upon by both the Prime Minister and the Leader of the Opposition.
3. The eight Commissioners unanimously nominate the Director of Elections
4. The Commissioners also nominate one their number to be Chairman of the Commission

Selected Commissioners and the Director of Elections are appointed for a period of seven years, while Nominated Commissioners serve for four years. The Director of Elections and the Selected Commissioners are disqualified by law to vote in any General or Local Government Elections or referendums.

== List of Electoral Commissioners ==
=== Current Commissioners ===
Current Commissioners
Name	Role	Since	Term ends
Hon. Earl Jarrett	Chairman	March 5, 2013	February 28, 2027
Hon. Patrick Brooks (Ret'd)	Selected Commissioner	January 27, 2025	January 27, 2032
Maurice Barnes	Selected Commissioner	November 1, 2021	November 1, 2028
Hon. Zaila McCalla	Selected Commissioner	January 1, 2020	December 31, 2027
Glasspole Brown	Director of Elections	July 1, 2018	
Hon. Thomas Tavares-Finson	Nominated Commissioner (JLP)	June 1, 2005	May 31, 2029
Wensworth Skeffery	Nominated Commissioner (PNP)	January 1, 2018	December 31, 2022
Dr. Aundre Franklin	Nominated Commissioner (JLP)	December 1, 2010	November 30, 2022
Dr. Dayton Campbell	Nominated Commissioner (PNP)	December 1, 2020	December 1, 2028

=== Former commissioners ===
Former Commissioners
Name	Role	Since	Term ends
Hon. Karl Harrison	Selected Commissioner	March 1, 2014	February 28, 2021
Prof. Alvin G. Wint	Selected Commissioner	March 1, 2014	February 28, 2021
Hon. Dorothy Pine-McLarty	Selected Commissioner	December 18, 2000	December 31, 2019
Dr. Herbert Thompson	Selected Commissioner	2000	2013
Hon. Clarence Walker	Selected Commissioner	2006	2014
Prof. Hon. Errol Miller	Selected Commissioner	November 1, 2006	December 31, 2012
Hon. Danville Walker	Director of Elections	1997	2008
Orrete Fisher	Director of Elections	November 1, 2008	March 2018
Hon. Karl Samuda	Nominated Commissioner (JLP)	November 1, 2006	2010
Dr. D. K. Duncan	Nominated Commissioner (PNP)	December 1, 2010	December 31, 2014
Donald Buchanan	Nominated Commissioner (PNP)	November 1, 2006	2010
Paul Burke	Nominated Commissioner (PNP)	March 2015	June 30, 2017
Linton Walters	Nominated Commissioner (PNP)	2002	2008
Peter Bunting	Nominated Commissioner (PNP)	2008	
