= Constitutional Reform Committee =

Committee of the Government of Jamaica

The Constitutional Reform Committee is a committee of the Government of Jamaica tasked with revising and reforming Jamaica's constitutional arrangements, including the abolition of the monarchy.

== Mandate ==
Its mandate is four-fold:

1. To assess the implementation of the recommendations of the Joint Select Committee on Constitutional and Electoral Reform (JSCCER), whose report was approved by Parliament in 1995.
2. To evaluate the recommendations of the JSCCER on establishing the Office of President.
3. To assist in coordinating the required bipartisan collaboration and national consultation during the various phases of reform work.
4. To educate the electorate on their role in the referendum process.

== Proposed reforms ==
The committee was approved by the Cabinet of Jamaica on 16 November 2022 as a consultative, collaborative committee. It was to be supported by a secretariat provided by the Ministry of Legal and Constitutional Affairs. The opposition leader, Mark Golding, criticised the government for excluding discussion of the Judicial Committee of the Privy Council from the purview of the committee.

=== First phase ===
The first phase of reform, expected to run for two months, was to include the repatriation of the Jamaican constitution, the abolition of constitutional monarchy, and the establishment of a republic. The aim was to table legislation in parliament to make Jamaica a republic in May 2023. In late April, Marlene Malahoo Forte said that the scope of the first phase would just be reduced to the abolition of constitutional monarchy: "Maybe we have to deal with the narrow question of just abolishing the monarch in the constitutional make up of Jamaica while we work out the other issues."

== Members ==
The 14 original members of the committee were announced on 23 March 2023.

Name	External position	Position within committee	Appointment date
Marlene Malahoo Forte	Minister of Legal and Constitutional Affairs	Co-chair	23 March 2023
Rocky Ricardo Meade	Ambassador Plenipotentiary for National Strategic Interests	Co-chair	23 March 2023
Derrick McKoy	Attorney General		23 March 2023
Tom Tavares-Finson	President of the Senate		23 March 2023
Ransford Braham	Senator		23 March 2023
Donna Scott-Mottley	Senator		23 March 2023
Anthony Hylton	Member of Parliament for Saint Andrew Western		23 March 2023
Richard Albert	Professor of Law at the University of Texas at Austin		23 March 2023
Lloyd Barnett	Attorney-at-law		23 March 2023
Hugh Small	Attorney-at-law		23 March 2023
David Henry	Pastor at Swallowfield Chapel	Faith-based society representative	23 March 2023
Nadeen Spence	Student services manager at Mary Seacole Hall, UWI	Civil society representative	23 March 2023
Lalieta Davis-Mattis	Chair of the National Committee on Reparations		23 March 2023
Sujae Boswell	Former president of the UWI, Mona Guild of Students	Youth advisor	23 March 2023

== Criticism ==
The appointment of Richard Albert was criticised by Christian groups Jamaica CAUSE and Jamaica Coalition for a Healthy Society as he is a non-national and because of his pro-LGBT views. Dancehall artist Spragga Benz claimed Albert's appointment was a cover for "the West" to promote gender-affirming surgery in Jamaica.
