= Leslie Campbell (politician) =

Jamaican politician (1958–2026)

MP for Saint Catherine North Eastern
- In office 2016–2020
- Succeeded by: Kerensia Morrison

Personal details
- Born: 29 August 1958
- Died: 3 May 2026 (aged 67)
- Party: Jamaica Labour Party

Leslie Campbell (29 August 1958 – 3 May 2026) was a Jamaican politician from the Labour Party. He was a member of the Senate of Jamaica and was Minister of State in the Ministry of Foreign Affairs and Foreign Trade in the Cabinet of Jamaica. Campbell died on 3 May 2026, at the age of 67.
