= Princess Lawes =

Jamaican politician (1945-2024)

Member of the House of Representatives of Jamaica for Saint Ann North Western
- In office 1980–1989

Member of the Senate of Jamaica
- In office 1976–1980

Personal details
- Born: Princess May Lawes; 1945 Mandeville, Jamaica
- Died: 19 April 2024 (aged 79)
- Party: Jamaica Labour Party
- Education: University of Kentucky

Princess May Lawes (1945 - 19 April 2024) was a Jamaican politician from the Jamaica Labour Party. She served in both houses of the Parliament of Jamaica.

== Early life and education ==
Lawes grew up in Mandeville, Manchester Parish. She studied in the United States at the University of Kentucky in Lexington and returned to Jamaica in 1974.

== Career ==
She elected for Saint Ann North Western in the 1980 Jamaican general election defeating cabinet minister Arnold Bertram. Before then she was a member of the Senate of Jamaica.

Lawes was appointed Parliamentary Secretary in the Ministry of Youth and Community Development from 1980 to 1983.

She was later president of the Inter-American Commission of Women at the Organization of American States. She also worked at the Jamaica Union Conference.

== Personal life ==
Lawes was a Seventh-day Adventist. She served the church for years in various capacities.

She died on 19 April 2024, at the age of 79. Prime Minister Andrew Holness paid tribute to her as did current Saint Ann North West MP Krystal Lee. On her death the opposition People's National Party (PNP) said her "advocacy for women, children, and the marginalised, resonated deeply with many”.

== See also ==
- List of female members of the House of Representatives of Jamaica
