= Horace Dalley =

Jamaican educator and politician

Horace Washington Dalley CD

Minister of Health
- In office 2015–2016
- Monarch: Elizabeth II
- Governor General: Sir Patrick Allen
- Prime Minister: Portia Simpson-Miller
- Preceded by: Fenton Ferguson
- Succeeded by: Christopher Tufton

Minister of Health
- In office 2006–2007
- Monarch: Elizabeth II
- Governor General: Sir Patrick Allen
- Prime Minister: Portia Simpson-Miller
- Preceded by: John Junor
- Succeeded by: Rudyard Spencer

Minister of Labour and Social Security
- In office 2002–2006
- Monarch: Elizabeth II
- Governor General: Sir Howard Cooke
- Prime Minister: P. J. Patterson
- Preceded by: Donald Buchanan
- Succeeded by: Derrick Kellier

Minister of Land and Environment
- In office 2001–2002
- Monarch: Elizabeth II
- Governor General: Sir Howard Cooke
- Prime Minister: P. J. Patterson
- Preceded by: Seymour Mullings
- Succeeded by: Dean Peart

Personal details
- Born: 17 December 1954 (age 71) Clarendon, Colony of Jamaica, British Empire
- Party: People's National Party
- Children: 4
- Awards: Order of Distinction (2014)

Horace Washington Dalley CD (born 17 December 1954) is a Jamaican educator and politician, representing the People's National Party (PNP). He was Member of Parliament (MP) for the constituency of Clarendon Northern, serving from 1989 to 2007, and again from 2011 to 2020. He served as Minister of Land and Environment from 2001 to 2002, Minister of Labour and Social Security from 2002 to 2006, Minister of Health from 2006 to 2007 and again from 2015 to 2016.

== Early life and education ==
Dalley was born on 17 December 1954, in Mitchell Town, Clarendon. He was educated at Mico University College. Prior to entering representational politics Dalley worked with the Ministry of Education in special projects. He served in the Diplomatic service and also worked as International Secretary for the People’s National Party (PNP).

== Political career ==
Dalley was first elected to the House of Representatives from the Clarendon Northern constituency in the 1989 general election, polling 7,015 votes to 6,135 for J. A. G. Smith of the Jamaica Labour Party (JLP). He went on to win the constituency for the People's National Party (PNP) in the 1993, 1997, and 2002 general elections. From 1989 to 2001, Dalley served as Parliamentary Secretary in the Ministry of Youth and Community Development, Ministry of Finance and Planning, Ministry of Production, Mining and Commerce and the Minister of State in the Ministry of Labour and Social Security. In 2001, he was appointed to the cabinet of P. J. Patterson as Minister of Land and Environment, succeeding Seymour Mullings. He was subsequently appointed Minister of Labour and Social Security in November 2002, succeeding Donald Buchanan. When Portia Simpson Miller became Prime Minister on 30 March 2006, she appointed Dalley to her cabinet as Minister of Health. He remained in office until the PNP went into opposition after its election defeat in September 2007. Dalley lost his seat in the 2007 general election to Laurence Broderick of the JLP, who polled 6,118 votes to Dalley's 5,891. Dalley was succeeded as Minister of Health by Rudyard Spencer. He regained the seat in the 2011 general elections, polling 7,663 votes to the JLP's Laurence Broderick (5,958). After the PNP returned to power in the 29 December 2011, general elections, Prime Minister Simpson-Miller appointed Dalley as Minister without portfolio in the Ministry of Finance, Planning and Public Service. On 9 November 2015, he again assumed the portfolio of Minister of Health upon the resignation of Fenton Ferguson. After the defeat of the PNP at the polls in the 2016 general election, Dalley served as opposition spokesman on Labour and Welfare. He again lost his seat in the 2020 general election, polling 5,345 votes to the JLP's Dwight Sibblies (6,058).

== Honors and awards ==
Dalley was awarded the Order of Distinction, Commander Class, in 2014.

== See also ==
- Ministry of Labour and Social Security (Jamaica)
- List of ministers of health of Jamaica

Political offices
Preceded by Seymour Mullings	Minister of Land and Environment; 2001 – 2002	Succeeded by Dean Peart
Preceded by Donald Buchanan	Minister of Labour and Social Security; 2002 – 2006	Succeeded by Derrick Kellier
Preceded by John Junor	Minister of Health; 2006 – 2007	Succeeded by Rudyard Spencer
Preceded by Rudyard Spencer	Minister of Health; 2006 – 2007	Succeeded by Christopher Tufton
