= Wykeham McNeill =

Jamaican politician

The Honourable Wykeham McNeill CD MP
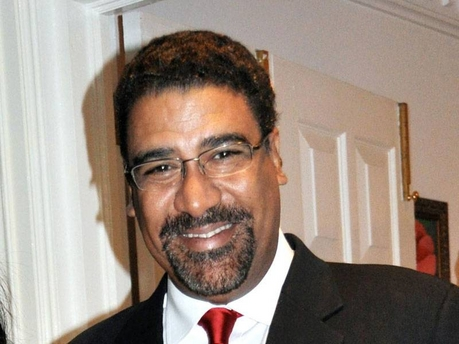

Opposition Spokesman on Tourism and Entertainment
- Incumbent
- Assumed office 18 March 2016
- Monarch: Elizabeth II
- Governor General: Patrick Allen
- Prime Minister: Andrew Holness
- Preceded by: Edmund Bartlett
- In office 11 September 2007 – 6 January 2012
- Monarch: Elizabeth II
- Governors General: Kenneth Hall; Patrick Allen
- Prime Minister: Bruce Golding; Andrew Holness
- Preceded by: Edmund Bartlett
- Succeeded by: Edmund Bartlett

Minister of Tourism and Entertainment
- In office 6 January 2012 – 3 March 2016
- Monarch: Elizabeth II
- Governor General: Patrick Allen
- Prime Minister: Portia Simpson-Miller
- Preceded by: Edmund Bartlett
- Succeeded by: Edmund Bartlett

Minister of State in the Ministry of Industry and Tourism
- In office 5 January 2000 – 11 September 2007
- Monarch: Elizabeth II
- Governor General: Kenneth Hall
- Prime Minister: P. J. Patterson; Portia Simpson-Miller

Member of Parliament for Westmoreland West
- In office 16 December 1997 – 3 September 2020
- Monarch: Elizabeth II
- Governors General: Kenneth Hall; Patrick Allen
- Prime Minister: P. J. Patterson; Portia Simpson-Miller; Bruce Golding; Andrew Holness; Portia Simpson-Miller; Andrew Holness
- Preceded by: Trevor Ruddock
- Succeeded by: Morland Wilson

Personal details
- Born: 10 October 1957 (age 69) Kingston, Colony of Jamaica, British Empire
- Party: People's National Party
- Spouse: Sheila Benjamin McNeill
- Education: University of Havana, Cuba

Kenneth Wykeham McNeill CD MP (born October 1957 in Kingston, St. Andrew Parish) is a Jamaican politician and former member of parliament for Westmoreland West, Jamaica. He is a former government minister. He was the Minister of Tourism of Jamaica from 2012 to 2016. He was elected the first vice chair of the Executive Council of the United Nations World Tourism Organization representing Jamaica in 2012 and elected chairman of the Executive council for the 2014-2015 period. McNeill was elected a Vice President of The People's National Party at the Party's annual conference in September 2016.

== Early life and education ==
Born in 1957 in the parish of Kingston, Jamaica, McNeill is the youngest son born to former Minister of Health Kenneth McNeill and his wife Valerie.

McNeill is a physician by profession, having graduated from Medical school at The University of Havana, Cuba in 1983. He has served in various hospitals in Jamaica including St. Anns Bay, Spanish Town, Kingston Public Hospitals and the University of the West Indies. He later went on to private practice at the Eureka Medical Center.

An avid lover of sports, McNeill served as a member of the Boxing Board of Control from 1994 to 1997 and chaired the Amateur Development and the Medical Committees of the board. He is also the founding chairman of the Sports Development Foundation (SDF), which he headed from 1995 to 2000. He is also a co-founder of the Clinic of Sports Medicine and Physical Therapy. He has worked with a number of national teams including the Reggae Boyz and in 1996, traveled as a member of the medical team to the Olympic Games in Athens.

== Political career ==
His constituency is the Western Westmoreland Parish. He was first elected in 1997 and then re-elected in 2002, being the first Member of Parliament in the history of this constituency to do so.

In 2000, he was appointed Minister of State in the Ministry of Tourism and Sports, and was reappointed again in 2002 with the responsibility of directly overseeing tourism operations, including cruise shipping and tourism development. In 2007 when Portia Simpson-Miller was appointed prime minister, McNeill was again appointed the Minister of State and continued in the post until the party faced by the Jamaica Labour Party (JLP) in 2007.

McNeill was then appointed the Spokesman of the Tourism Sector in Jamaica, who was part of the shadow Cabinet while in opposition. McNeill is also the former chairman of The Public Administration and Appropriations Committee He was former chairman of region 6 for the People's National Party (PNP) but later resigned from the post in his bid to seek Vice Presidency of the party. He has held the constituency of Western Westmoreland, Jamaica since his first bid for Parliament. In the 2012 Local government election the parish of Westmoreland won all 14 parish councils for the PNP. McNeill's constituency won all 5 divisions.

== Elections ==
The 2011 general election was called by former prime minister Andrew Holness on 29 December 2011. McNeill won his seat of Western Westmoreland in what was considered to be a landslide victory for himself while his party, the PNP also garnered a landslide victory winning 42 of the 63 Parliamentary seats. On 6 January 2012 he was appointed the Minister of Tourism in the new PNP 2012 Government.

As McNeill assumed the position of Minister of Tourism and Entertainment in Jamaica, the island experienced growth in the sector. He began discussions with senior officials in the Ministry of Tourism and several of its key agencies to prepare for future initiatives under the new government.

On 25 February 2016 the general elections were once again called with the ruling People's National Party expected to retain state power. However, the JLP won the elections with a one-seat majority.

On 3 September 2020 parliamentary elections, McNeil lost his seat to JLP newcomer and Business Development Specialist, Morland Wilson in one of the most shocking losses in the PNP camp. The JLP retained state power with a massive 49 seats of the 63 seats in the Lower House.

== Family life ==
McNeill is married to Sheila Benjamin McNeill and has two children, his son Jordan McNeill and stepdaughter Ashleigh Fernandez.
