= Colin Fagan =

Jamaican politician

MP for Saint Catherine South Eastern
- In office 2007–2020
- Preceded by: Keith Blake
- Succeeded by: Robert Miller

Personal details
- Party: People's National Party

Colin Fagan is a Jamaican politician from the People's National Party (PNP) who represented Saint Catherine South Eastern in the Parliament of Jamaica.

== Career ==
Colin Fagan became the first deputy mayor of Portmore in 2003. Fagan was elected in the 2007 Jamaican general election and re-elected in 2011 and 2016. He was appointed Minister of State at the Ministry of Local Government and Community Development. In the 2020 Jamaican general election he was unseated by Robert Miller from the Jamaica Labour Party.
