= Heatha Miller-Bennett =

Jamaican politician

MP for Hanover Western
- Incumbent
- Assumed office 3 September 2025
- Preceded by: Tamika Davis

Personal details
- Party: People's National Party

Heatha Miller-Bennett is a Jamaican politician from the People's National Party who has been MP for Hanover Western since 2025.

Miller-Bennett unseated incumbent MP Tamika Davis. She is an attorney-at-law by profession. Her father Fredricous Miller is the former deputy mayor of Lucea.

== See also ==
- 15th Parliament of Jamaica
