= Delano Seiveright =

Jamaican politician

The Honourable Delano Seiveright MP
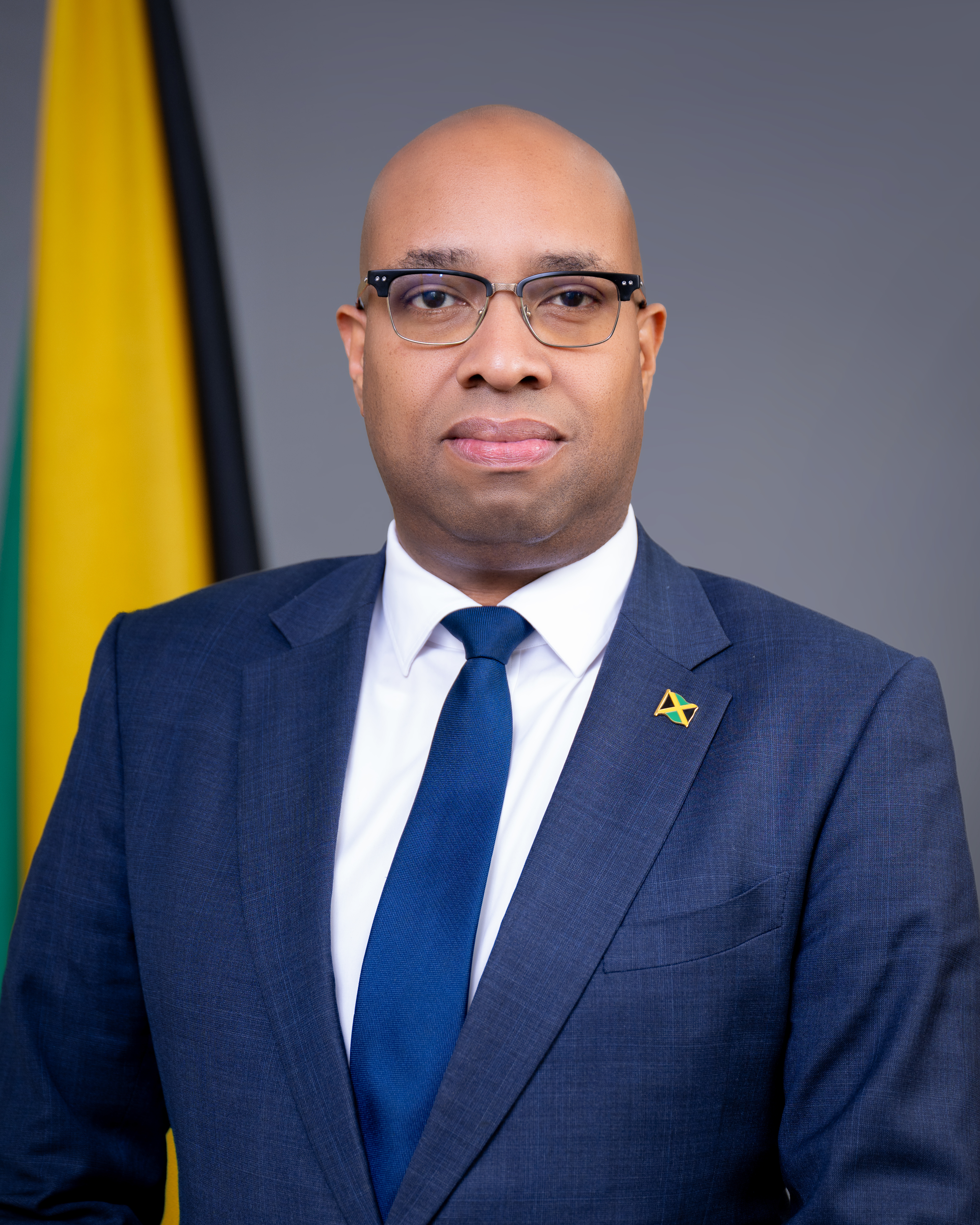
- Seiveright in 2025

Minister of State in the Ministry of Industry, Investment and Commerce
- Incumbent
- Assumed office September 2025
- Minister: Aubyn Hill

MP for Saint Andrew North Central
- Incumbent
- Assumed office 3 September 2025
- Preceded by: Karl Samuda

Personal details
- Born: August 2, 1984 (age 41)
- Party: Jamaica Labour Party
- Education: University of the West Indies (BSc); University of London (MSc)

Delano Orlando Seiveright (MP) is a Jamaican politician and public policy strategist who currently serves as the minister of state in the Ministry of Industry, Investment and Commerce. He was elected Member of Parliament for the St Andrew North Central Constituency in the general election held on 3 September 2025 representing the Jamaica Labour Party (JLP). Previously, Seiveright served as a senator, Strategic Consultant and Minister of State in the Ministry of Tourism, where he was credited with initiatives that resulted in the record visitor arrivals, expanded airlift and linkages throughout the sector.

He has also been appointed to the boards of several public organizations, including the Jamaica Promotions Corporation (JAMPRO), the Jamaica Tourist Board (JTB), and the Cannabis Licensing Authority (CLA), and National Insurance Fund (NIF).

== Early life and education ==
Delano Seiveright was raised in West Central St. Andrew. He attended Calabar High School, where he excelled academically and in leadership activities. Seiveright earned a Bachelor of Science degree in political science from the University of the West Indies, Mona, and later a Master of Science degree in public policy and management from the University of London.

== Political career ==
=== Early involvement ===
Seiveright served as president of the University of the West Indies, Mona Campus Youth League, a chapter of the Jamaica Labour Party’s young professional affiliate, Generation 2000 (G2K). He later joined G2K’s central executive and was elected president of the organisation in 2009.

=== Representative politics ===
Seiveright entered representational politics in 2016 as the Jamaica Labour Party (JLP) candidate for the Eastern St. Thomas constituency. In November 2024, he was elected by unanimous ballot as the JLP vice-chairman for North Central St. Andrew constituency, with the support of veteran parliamentarian Karl Samuda and local councillors. In the general election held on 3 September 2025, he was elected Member of Parliament for the constituency.

== Government service ==
=== Advisory roles ===
Seiveright began his political career working under the leadership of Prime Minister Bruce Golding in the Office of the Prime Minister, and later in the Ministry of Energy and Mining between 2007 and 2011.

In 2016, Seiveright was appointed senior advisor and strategist to the minister of tourism, Edmund Bartlett. In this role, he was credited with contributing to the growth of Jamaica’s tourism industry through increased airlift, record visitor arrivals, and the development of the Tourism Workers’ Pension Scheme. During this period, more than 350,000 Jamaicans were employed in tourism and related sectors, and Seiveright was involved in initiatives that strengthened economic linkages and enhanced the sector’s resilience. He was later elected to the Senate of Jamaica in 2025, where he participated in parliamentary debates and contributed to policy formulation.

=== Ministerial roles ===
In 2025, Seiveright was appointed Minister of State in the Ministry of Tourism, with responsibility for strengthening linkages between tourism and other sectors of the economy to ensure that the benefits of the industry are widely shared. In this role, he focused on enhancing the sector’s resilience and competitiveness, and on advancing policies to deepen connections with agriculture, manufacturing, and other areas of the Jamaican economy.

After his election as Member of Parliament to represent St Andrew North Central in September 2025, he was appointed as Minister of State, in the Ministry of Industry, Investment and Commerce, with a mandate to support the development of the industry, industry linkages and the development of the private sector as a part of the overall economic development strategy of Jamaica.

=== Other Public Services ===
Seiveright has also contributed to national development through service on the boards of several public institutions, including:

- Jamaica Promotions Corporation (JAMPRO).
- The Jamaica Tourist Board (JTB)
- The Tourism Product Development Company (TPDCo)
- The Cannabis Licensing Authority (CLA)
- The National Insurance Fund (NIF)

== See also ==
- Cabinet of Jamaica
- Politics of Jamaica
- Tourism in Jamaica
