= Richard Albert (professor) =

Canadian-American legal scholar

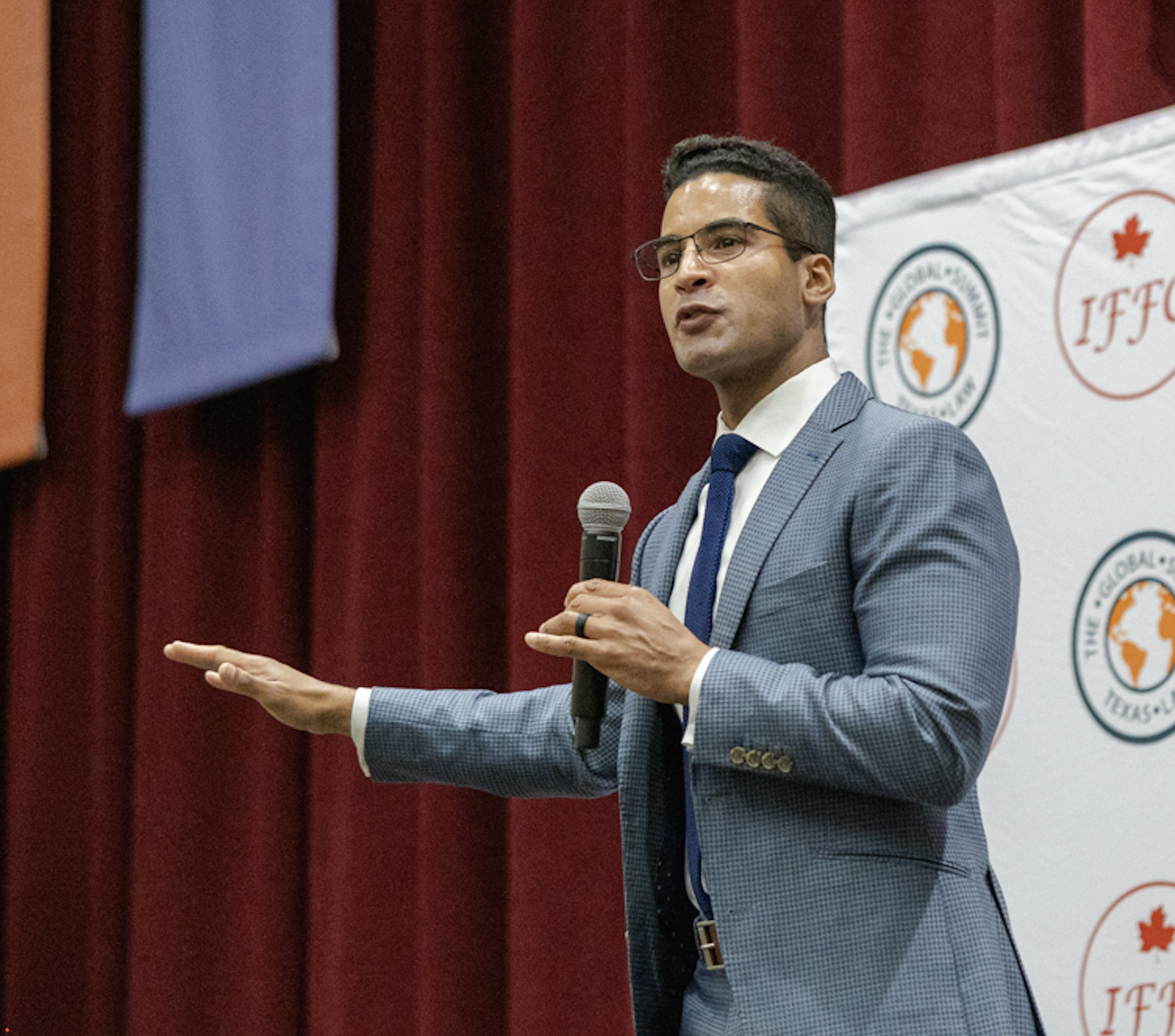
- Albert chairing the 2025 Global Summit of Constitutionalism in Austin, Texas

Academic background
- Education: Yale University (BA, JD); University of Oxford (BCL); Harvard University (LLM)

Academic work
- Discipline: Legal scholar
- Sub-discipline: Constitutional law
- Institutions: University of Texas School of Law
- Website: Official website

Richard Albert is a Canadian legal scholar who serves as the William Stamps Farish Professor in Law, Professor of Government, and Director of Constitutional Studies at the University of Texas School of Law in Austin, Texas. He is also the only non-Jamaican member of the Constitutional Reform Committee, which is advising the Jamaican government on how to revise their constitution. He also serves as co-president of the International Society of Public Law.

== Early life and education ==
Albert was born in Quebec to a Trinidadian father and a Haitian mother. He received his B.A. and J.D. degrees from Yale University, his B.C.L. from the University of Oxford, and his LL.M. from Harvard University. He clerked for Beverley McLachlin, Chief Justice of the Supreme Court of Canada.

== Controversy ==
In 2023, local Christians in the area advocated for the removal of Albert from the Constitutional Reform Committee saying "he has a distinct pro-LGBT and pro-abortion bias".

== Publications ==
- Constitutional Amendments: Making, Breaking, and Changing Constitutions. Oxford University Press. 2019. ISBN 9780190640491.
- The Law and Legitimacy of Imposed Constitutions. Routledge. 2020. ISBN 9780367519926.
- Richard Albert; Yaniv Roznai, eds. (2020). Constitutionalism Under Extreme Conditions. Springer International Publishing. ISBN 9783030490003.
