= List of ministers of health of Jamaica =

The following is a list of health ministers of Jamaica since adult suffrage (1944).

1. Rose Leon (1953–1955)
2. C. L. A. Stuart (1955–1959)
3. Ivan Lloyd (1959–1962)
4. Herbert Eldemire (1962–1972)
5. Kenneth McNeill (1972–1977)
6. Douglas Manley (1977–1980)
7. Kenneth Baugh (1980–1989)
8. Easton Douglas (1989–1993)
9. Desmond Leakey (1993–1995)
10. Peter Phillips (1995–1997)
11. John Junor (1998–2006)
12. Horace Dalley (2006–2007)
13. Rudyard Spencer (2007–2012)
14. Fenton Ferguson (2012–2015)
15. Horace Dalley (2015–2016)
16. Christopher Tufton (2016–present)

== See also ==
- Cabinet of Jamaica
- Ministries and agencies of the Jamaican government
