= Saphire Longmore =

Jamaican politician

Senator The Honourable Dr. Saphire Longmore MP

Member of the Senate of Jamaica
- Incumbent
- Assumed office 2018

Personal details
- Born: Saphire Indrea Longmore; 1976 (age 49–50)
- Party: Jamaican Labour Party
- Education: University of the West Indies; Glenmuir High School
- Beauty pageant titleholder
- Title: Miss Universe 2000
- Hair color: Brown
- Eye color: Brown
- Major competitions: Miss Jamaica Universe 2000 (Winner); Miss Universe 2000 (Unplaced)

Saphire Indrea Longmore-Dropinski (born 1976) is a Jamaican politician and former Miss Jamaica Universe pageant titleholder. She is member of the Jamaica Labour Party who served as a Government Senator in the Upper House of Parliament of Jamaica for two full terms, spanning ten years of public service. Dr. Longmore also works as a psychiatrist and model. She represented her country at Miss Universe 2000 pageant in Cyprus, after winning the Miss Jamaica Universe.

== Education ==
Dr. Longmore attended Glenmuir High School where she was Deputy Head girl, and Graduated Medical school at 22 years old, earning a Bachelor of Medicine and Bachelor Of Surgery (MBBS) degree, becoming the first doctor to win a major beauty title in Jamaica in 2000; as well as earning a Phd Doctorate degree in Psychiatry from the University Of The West Indies, Mona.

== Personal life ==
In 2008, she is married European Union diplomat Alex Dropinski, with whom she shares two sons.

== See also ==
- 14th Parliament of Jamaica
