= Purkiss =

Purkiss is a surname. Notable people with the surname include:

- Andrea Purkiss, Jamaican politician
- Anne-Katrin Purkiss (born 1959), German photographer
- Ben Purkiss (born 1984), English footballer
- Diane Purkiss (born 1961), British literary historian
- Marina Purkiss, British political commentator
- William Purkiss (1844–1906), Australian politician
