= Jennifer Edwards (politician) =

Jamaican politician

MP for Saint Catherine South Western
- In office 1997–2002
- Preceded by: unknown
- Succeeded by: Everald Warmington

Personal details
- Party: People's National Party

Jennifer Edwards is a Jamaican politician from the People's National Party (PNP) who served as a one-term member of the Parliament of Jamaica.

== Political career ==
Edwards was MP for Saint Catherine South Western from 1997 to 2002. She was later Executive Director of the National Solid Waste Management Authority (NSWMA).

Edwards was President of the PNP Women’s Movement.
