= John Junor (Jamaican politician) =

Jamaican politician

MP for Manchester Central
- In office 1989–2007
- Preceded by: unknown
- Succeeded by: Peter Bunting

Personal details
- Political party: People's National Party

John Junor is a Jamaican retired politician from the People's National Party (PNP) who was Member of Parliament for Manchester Central.

After leaving politics he returned to the legal profession at the law firm Knight, Junor and Samuels.
