= Richard Azan =

Jamaican politician (born 1964)

Richard Azan MP

Minister of State in the Ministry of Transport and Housing
- In office January 2012 – September 2013

Member of the Jamaican Parliament for Clarendon North Western
- Incumbent
- Assumed office 2025
- In office 16 October 2002 – 7 September 2020
- Preceded by: Phillip Henriques

Personal details
- Born: 8 June 1964 (age 62)
- Party: People's National Party
- Education: Holmwood Technical High School

Richard Edward Azan (born 8 June 1964) is a Jamaican politician from the People's National Party (PNP) who represented Clarendon North Western in the Parliament of Jamaica.

Azan served as state minister in the Ministry of Transport, Works and Housing.
