= Gregory Mair =

Jamaican politician

Desmond Gregory Mair is a Jamaican Labour Party (JLP) member of the Parliament of Jamaica representing the Saint Catherine North East constituency.

== Background ==
Mair's family is historically associated with the JLP. His grandfather, Gerald Mair, was a JLP senator and treasurer of the party. Mair's mother was born in Munich, Germany and raised in Venezuela. She came to Jamaica to study English and married his father, founder and owner of the Desmond G. Mair insurance brokerage. After their divorce she returned to Venezuela with Gregory, where he studied civil engineering. Mair earned an MBA in Chile, and then chose to return to Jamaica in 1999. He has since expanded the family business beyond insurance brokerage into housing development.

Mair is an active Roman Catholic. He is married to a dentist, Dr. Paula Mair; they have two sons, Sebastian and Andrew, and a daughter, Nicole.

== Political career ==
Originally a member of the National Democratic Movement, by 2003 Mair had affiliated with the JLP. Former MP Abe Dabdoub accused Mair of being part of a conspiracy by former NDM members led by Bruce Golding to take over the JLP. Mair was elected to Parliament in 2007 with 5,996 votes (53.9%), to 5,134 (46.1%) for his opponent, former MP Phyllis Mitchell of the People's National Party. Following the election, Mitchell filed an election petition stating that since Mair was a Venezuelan citizen, he was not entitled under Jamaican law to be an MP. In 2009, the Supreme Court declared the seat vacant and called for a by-election, after Mair conceded that he had held Venezuelan citizenship as well as Jamaican when he was nominated for the 2007 election. In the by-election, Mair (who had since renounced his Venezuelan citizenship) defeated PNP candidate Granville Valentine by 6,329 votes (63.3%) to Valentine's 3,672 (36.7%). (The constituency has roughly 19,000 voters.) Valentine attributed his defeat to his low profile in the district and the size of the constituency.
