= Karl Samuda =

Jamaican politician

Karl Samuda OJ CD MP

Minister of Education, Youth Skills and Information
- In office 2019–2020
- Prime Minister: Andrew Holness
- Preceded by: Ruel Reid
- Succeeded by: Fayval Williams

Minister of Labour and Social Security
- In office 2020–2023
- Preceded by: Mike Henry
- Succeeded by: Pearnel Charles Jr.

Minister of Industry, Investment and Commerce
- In office 2007–2011

Minister of Industry, Commerce, Agriculture and Fisheries
- In office 2016–2018

Member of Parliament for Saint Andrew North Central
- In office 1980–2025
- Preceded by: constituency established
- Succeeded by: Delano Seiveright

Personal details
- Born: February 8, 1942 (age 84) Kingston, Colony of Jamaica
- Party: Jamaica Labour Party
- Spouse: Pauline Samuda
- Children: 3
- Education: Ardenne High School; University of Ottawa

Karl George Samuda OJ (born 8 February 1942) is a Jamaican politician. He is also known as a businessman, farmer and technocrat.

== Education ==
He attended Ardenne High School and pursued tertiary education in Canada, where he obtained a Bachelor of Commerce Degree from the University of Ottawa. Steeped in the discipline of Business Administration, he returned to Jamaica and was employed to Alcan Jamaica Limited and Industrial Gases Limited before venturing into furniture manufacturing and later farming, vocations which still occupy his interest, if and when his ministerial duties and political activities allow.

== Career ==
A former General Secretary of the Jamaica Labour Party, Karl Samuda was the Member of Parliament for Saint Andrew North Central from 1980 until 2025, and has the distinction of representing both major political parties in that constituency.

He was the Minister without Portfolio in the Ministry of Economic Growth and Job Creation with responsibility for Water, Works and Housing in Jamaica until his resignation in 2023. He was previously the Minister of Industry, Commerce, Agriculture and Fisheries and served in that position between 2007 and 2011.

Karl Samuda also served on the Electoral Commission of Jamaica, having previously served an eight-year stint as a member of the Electoral Advisory Committee.

He served as Minister of State in earlier administrations and was Minister of Industry, Commerce Agriculture & Fisheries as well as Minister without Portfolio in the Ministry of Economic Growth and Job Creation (MEGJC), He also served as Minister of Education from 2019-2020.

Samuda stood down at the 2025 Jamaican general election and was succeeded by Delano Seiveright.

== 1993 Nomination Day Incident ==
During the lead-up to the 1993 Jamaican general election, Samuda, contesting as the People's National Party (PNP) candidate for St. Andrew North Central, was involved in a violent political clash on Nomination Day, March 12, 1993. According to contemporary reports, a confrontation erupted outside Samuda's constituency office on Charlton Avenue between PNP supporters and Jamaica Labour Party (JLP) supporters led by his opponent, Tom Tavares-Finson. Two people were shot and a police officer was stabbed during the fracas. Samuda stated that his wife, Pauline, narrowly escaped being shot after a supporter pushed her out of the crossfire. While PNP officials accused JLP supporters of instigating the violence, Tavares-Finson countered that PNP supporters had initiated the clash by throwing stones and bottles at his procession.

== 1990 Spy Scandal, Shadow Cabinet Sacking, and JLP Expulsion ==
Following the Jamaica Labour Party's (JLP) defeat in the 1989 general election, Samuda became a prominent internal critic of Party Leader Edward Seaga's centralized leadership style. This growing friction culminated in April 1990 when former JLP Senator Abe Dabdoub presented an intercepted letter and audio recordings to the JLP Central Executive exposing an illegal, internal wiretapping operation targeting party dissidents.

The crisis solidified a distinct faction of five former cabinet ministers—Samuda, Pearnel Charles, Edmund Bartlett, Errol Anderson, and Douglas Vaz—who were dubbed the "Gang of Five" by pollster Professor Carl Stone as they pushed to democratize the party. Seaga quickly deployed punitive measures against Samuda. In May 1990, Seaga refused to reappoint Samuda to the Electoral Advisory Committee upon the expiration of his term. In June 1990, Samuda and his colleagues successfully mobilized delegates to vote down the Standing Committee nomination of Seaga’s close ally, Olivia Grange, over her admitted role in supplying the recording equipment used to spy on them. Samuda publicly demanded an official apology from Grange for attempting to "entrap" senior members, a demand she defiantly rejected.

Tensions escalated dramatically in September 1990 when Samuda delivered a speech to the Jamaica Chamber of Commerce advocating for the deregulation of the country's foreign exchange system—a stance that directly contradicted the party's official policy line. Seaga immediately stripped Samuda of his shadow portfolio as Opposition Spokesman on Public Utilities and Transport, citing a breach of the principle of collective responsibility. Concurrently, Party Chairman Bruce Golding hand-delivered a mandatory loyalty oath forcing all JLP parliamentarians to sign and reaffirm their allegiance, an ultimatum Samuda fiercely resisted.

In October 1990, the leadership deployed a strategy to break the faction by isolating Samuda. Seaga extended an offer to open lines of communication with Charles, Bartlett, Anderson, and Vaz on the condition that they individually denounce the group, but completely excluded Samuda. Insiders noted Samuda had further infuriated the leadership by publicly declaring that Seaga had surrounded himself with "yes-men." Seaga delivered an absolute ultimatum to the Standing Committee, threatening to resign as Leader of the JLP unless Samuda was permanently expelled from the party. Samuda was subsequently hauled before a disciplinary committee chaired by Senator Ossie Harding and officially expelled, a decision his colleagues later described as a contrived act of political injustice and one of the darkest moments in the party's history.

== Personal life ==
He is married and has three sons.
