= Rudyard Spencer =

Jamaican politician

The Honourable Rudyard Spencer CD MP

Minister of Finance and the Public Service
- In office 2016–2020
- Prime Minister: Andrew Holness
- Preceded by: Fenton Ferguson
- Succeeded by: Horace Dalley

Member of the Senate of Jamaica
- In office 1995–1997

Minister of Health
- In office 2007–2012

Personal details
- Born: February 23, 1944 (age 82) Grange Hill, Colony of Jamaica, British Empire
- Party: Jamaica Labour Party
- Education: City University of New York; Medgar Evers College; Cornell University

Rudyard Conrad "Ruddy" Spencer, CD (born 23 February 1944) is a Jamaican former politician. A member of the Jamaica Labour Party (JLP), Spencer was first appointed to the Senate of Jamaica in 1993. Spencer was also a member of parliament for South East Clarendon for 18 years. He won every election he contested until his retirement from politics in February 2020.

== Early life ==
Spencer was born on 23 February 1944 in Grange Hill, Westmoreland, Jamaica. He was educated in Medgar Evers College, City University of New York, and graduated from Cornell University with a degree in industrial relations.

== Career ==
In 1993, Spencer was appointed to the Senate of Jamaica. From 1995 to 1997, he was the Leader of the Opposition Business in the Senate. From 2002 to 2020, he was a member of parliament for South East Clarendon. Spencer served as the Minister of Health in Jamaica from 2007 to 2012. In 2016, he was appointed as Minister of Finance and the Public Service. Spencer also directed the Jamaica Confederation of Trade Unions and was a member of the Caribbean Congress of Labour. In February 2020, Spencer announced his retirement from electoral politics. Members of both the JLP and the PNP paid tribute to Spencer for his years of service. While awaiting his appointment to the Jamaican embassy in Berlin, Germany, Spencer served as deputy chairman of the Industrial Disputes Tribunal (IDT).

== Recognition ==
In 1995, Spencer was awarded the Order of Distinction (Officer Class), and promoted to Commander Class in 2014 for "more than 20 years of distinguished service to parliament".

Trade union offices
Preceded by Hugh Shearer	President of the Bustamante Industrial Trade Union; 2004–2007	Succeeded by Kavan Gayle
