= Sophia Frazer Binns =

Jamaican politician

Member of the Jamaican Senate
- Incumbent
- Assumed office 2020

Personal details
- Born: Sophia Lilleth Frazer; September 4, 1982 (age 44)
- Party: People’s National Party
- Education: University of the West Indies; Norman Manley Law School; University of Westminster

Sophia Lilleth Frazer Binns (born 4 September 1982) is a Jamaican politician from the People's National Party (PNP) who is a member of the Senate of Jamaica. She is shadow minister Land Environment and Climate Change.
