= Keste Miller =

Jamaican politician

Keste Miller is a Jamaican politician from the People's National Party. He resigned from the Senate of Jamaica on 10 October 2005, and was succeeded by Donna Scott-Mottley.
