= Fayval Williams =

Jamaican politician

The Honourable Fayval Williams MP
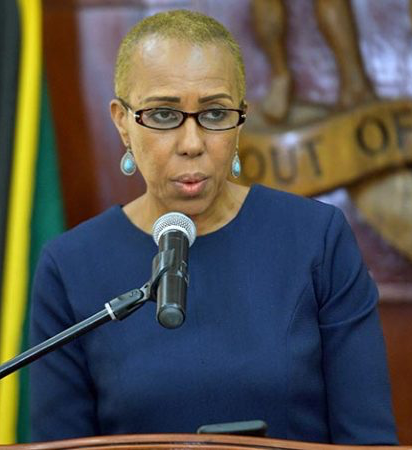

Minister of Finance and the Public Service
- Incumbent
- Assumed office 30 October 2024
- Preceded by: Nigel A. L. Clarke

Minister of Education, Youth and Information
- In office 13 September 2020 – 30 October 2024
- Prime Minister: Andrew Holness
- Preceded by: Karl Samuda
- Succeeded by: Dana Morris Dixon

Minister of Science, Energy and Technology
- In office 14 February 2019 – 12 September 2020
- Preceded by: Andrew Holness
- Succeeded by: Daryl Vaz

Without Portfolio in the Ministry of Finance and the Public Service
- In office 27 March 2018 – 13 February 2019
- Prime Minister: Andrew Holness
- Minister: Nigel A. L. Clarke
- Preceded by: Horace Dalley

State Minister in the Ministry of Finance and the Public Service
- In office 7 March 2016 – 26 March 2018
- Minister: Audley Shaw

Member of Parliament for Saint Andrew Eastern
- Incumbent
- Assumed office 16 February 2016
- Preceded by: Andre Hylton

Personal details
- Born: May 28, 1958 (age 68) St Catherine
- Party: Jamaica Labour Party
- Spouse: Leo Williams
- Education: University of Pennsylvania (MA) Harvard University (BA)

Fayval Shirley Williams (née Johnston; born 28 May 1958) is a Jamaican politician who is the Minister of Finance and the Public Service and the Member of Parliament for the St Andrew Eastern constituency. Williams has held multiple ministerial positions, including Minister of Education and Youth, Minister of Science, Energy and Technology, and Minister without Portfolio in the Ministry of Finance and the Public Service. She is the first female to be a minister in the Ministry of Finance and the Public Service, and also the first female Minister of Science, Energy and Technology.

In the September 3, 2025 General Elections, Williams was re-elected to the House of Representatives as the member of parliament for St Andrew Eastern. She was sworn in at a ceremony held at the Houses of Parliament on 18 September 2025. It marked her third consecutive victory at the polls.

She had previously been re-elected in the September 3, 2020 General Elections, and was sworn in on 15 September 2020 at the Jamaica Conference Centre, in a ceremony adapted to public health protocols during the coronavirus pandemic.

Williams was first elected as Member of Parliament in the 2016 general election when she polled 7,143 votes to become the first female Member of Parliament for St Andrew Eastern. She is a member of the governing Jamaica Labour Party and has served as secretary for the party's Central Executive Committee. In June 2014, Fayval Williams was named as a member of the Jamaica Labour Party's Economic Advisory Council.

== Education ==
Fayval Williams is a Chartered Financial Analyst (CFA). She has a Master in Business Administration (MBA) with concentration in Finance from The Wharton Business School at the University of Pennsylvania. Williams is also the holder of and a Bachelor of Arts (cum laude) in Economics from Harvard University in Cambridge, Massachusetts. Fayval attended Ferncourt High School in St Ann, Jamaica.

== Early life and career ==
Fayval Williams grew up in Ty Dixon, St Catherine and is the seventh of nine children of her parents Myrtle Johnston and James Johnston. Williams father was a carpenter who was known as a builder of Seventh Day Baptist Churches. Williams grew up as a Sabbath keeper under the influence of her mother and would attend church regularly on Saturdays. Williams attended Ty Dixon All-Age, now Ty Dixon Primary and Infant School. She then had to board with another family while she attended Ferncourt High School.

== Politics ==
Fayval Williams was first sworn in as Member of Parliament in the House of Representatives on 10 March 2016.

She was presented as caretaker for the St Andrew Eastern constituency 23 March 2015 by the leader of the Jamaica Labour Party Andrew Holness after having been organising the constituency since early 2014. She was officially nominated as the Jamaica Labour Party candidate on February 9, 2016, at the Mona High School. Williams succeeded Dr Saphire Longmore as caretaker, who lost to the People's National Party's (PNP) Andre Hylton by 254 votes in the 2011 General Election. During the tenure of Dr St Aubyn Bartlett (former Member of Parliament), she served as constituency treasurer.

Williams secured a second term as member of parliament for St Andrew Eastern in the September 3, 2020 General Elections. Preliminary numbers published by the Electoral Office of Jamaica (EOJ) showed that Williams polling 6,972 votes to her opponent Venesha Phillips total of 4,730. The official results published by the EOJ showed that Williams polled 6,954 representing 58.77 per cent of the votes while Phillips polled 4,642 representing 39.23 per cent of the votes.

In the September 3, 2025 General Elections, Williams was against victorious at the polls, defeating the Peoples National Party's Patricia Duncan Sutherland. According to the official results, Williams amassed 6,737 votes while her opponent received 6,303. Carl Cargill of the Jamaica Progressive Party received 67 votes. With her victory, Williams has become the winningest MP for the constituency surpassing all the others who had been elected for two terms at most.

== Ministry of Finance and the Public Service ==
Following the results of the September 3, 2025 General Elections, Prime Minister Andrew Holness reappointed Williams to the Cabinet as minister of finance as the public service. She was sworn to office at King's House on September 17, 2025.

On 30 October 2024, Williams was announced as the Minister of Finance and the Public Service by Prime Minister Andrew Holness. She replaced Dr Nigel Clarke who resigned from the post to take up duties at the International Monetary Fund. Her appointment makes her the first female to become minister of finance and the public service.

Williams had been promoted to a full minister on March 23, 2018, by Prime Minister Andrew Holness in a Cabinet reshuffled to join Dr Nigel Clarke as ministers in the Ministry of Finance and the Public Service. She held the position of minister without portfolio. Her elevation to minister, made her the first female to be a full minister in the finance and public service ministry. On 7 March 2016, Fayval Williams was appointed as State Minister in the Ministry of Finance to work alongside Audley Shaw and Rudyard Spencer. Her portfolio responsibilities include but not limited to fiscal policy.

=== Budget 2025 ===
On 11 March 2025, Fayval Williams opened the Budget Debate in the Jamaican House of Representatives, making her the first woman to do so in Jamaica's history. She defended the J$1.3 trillion expenditure budget for the 2025/26 fiscal year, announcing that, for the tenth consecutive time, the administration would not introduce any new taxes. Williams tabled the budget amid news that Jamaica had experienced two consecutive quarters of economic decline, meeting the criteria for a technical recession. However, the finance minister maintained that the economy remained resilient, attributing the downturn to a series of shocks during the 2024/25 fiscal year — including a prolonged drought, the devastating impact of Hurricane Beryl, Tropical Storm Raphael, and widespread flooding across all 14 parishes in November. She cited Fitch Ratings' February 2025 affirmation of a BB− rating with a positive outlook Jamaica's Long-Term Foreign-Currency Issuer Default Rating (IDR) as confirmation that the country had strong economic fundamentals.

=== Economic Policy ===
Months after taking up post at the Finance Ministry, Fayval Williams informed that the government would be exploring alternatives 11.4 Billion annual National Housing Trust withdrawals for budget financing, effectively discontinuing the policy of the previous administration.

In her first Sectoral presentation in Parliament June 24, 2016, Williams disclosed that the Pensions (Public Service) Act to establish a contributory pension scheme in the public sector, is to come before Parliament. "Getting the public employee pension administration system completed is a key goal for this administration," Williams announced.

In July 2016, Fayval Williams pointed to the need for Jamaica to implement a national identification system.

As State Minister, Williams invited the Small Business Association of Jamaica (SBAJ) to formulate an implementation team to work with the government of Jamaica to strategise the growth and development of its members. Her invitation was triggered by the SBAJ announcing its three main goals for 2016 for which it seeks government intervention. She noted that government intervention is always necessary for the private sector of any economy. She signaled that the government would be willing to assist, but only if the implementation team was established.

=== Caribbean Financial Action Task Force ===
Williams is the current chairman for the Caribbean Financial Action Task Force (CFAFT). Her period of chairmanship is between the period of December 2024 and November 2025. She chaired the 60th CFAFT Plenary on May 28, 2025 in Trinidad and Tobago. Previously as minister of state in the Ministry of Finance and the Public Service, she delivered a special address at a CFAFT Plenary meeting in Jamaica on June 8, 2016.

=== Public Sector Policy ===
Williams has argued that improving efficiencies through the modernisation and transformation of the public sector is critical in achieving higher levels of economic growth.

== Ministry of Education Youth and Information ==
=== COVID-19 Pandemic ===
Williams became the minister in the ministry during the COVID-19 pandemic. During much of 2020, schools across Jamaica had been closed and teaching and learning were being conducted online. However, Williams led a pilot programme which involved 17 public schools resuming face-to-face teaching and learning. On 12 April 2022, Williams reported to parliament that the government had spent $1.8 billion to militate against learning loss across the education sector resulting from the COVID-19 pandemic. She reported in May 2022 that daily school attendance was almost back to the pre-pandemic level of 75 per cent. The minister however conceded that the figure was still below world standards.

==== Device Distribution ====
As a part of the government's response to COVID-19, Williams' ministry launched initiatives to provide tablets and laptops to students in need. These efforts aimed to bridge the digital divide and ensure that all students had the necessary tools to participate in online learning. She said that some 25,000 teachers across the island had been trained to utilise the technology in order to facilitate online learning amid the COVID-19 pandemic.

Williams announced on 9 January 2023 that civics education was being reintroduced in the National Standards Curriculum at all levels. The minister emphasized that the program is a crucial addition to the curriculum that would help children become more aware of their identity as Jamaicans and progress toward becoming law-abiding, productive citizens in the future.

=== CPFSA Controversy ===
On 11 January 2023, Williams tabled a report in the House of Representatives, published by the Office of the Advocate (OCA), of the findings of an investigation into the relationship between the Child Protection and Family Services Agency (CPFSA) and Carl Robanske, head of the US-based organisation Embracing Orphans. Robanske had been sanctioned in the US for exchanging sexually inappropriate messages to a minor. Williams said she was outraged at the findings of the report provided by the Office of the Children's Advocate while accusing chief executive officer of the CPFSA Rosalee Gage Grey disobeying instructions to sever ties with the American after the claims of sexual misconduct surfaced.

Williams said she was "misled" by Gage Grey and called on her to step aside while investigations are ongoing. Williams told Parliament that the police have been given the information necessary for a deeper probe to determine if charges can be brought against persons named in the OCA report.

Williams would later inform that Gage Grey would be separated from the CPFSA based on the recommendation of the Public Services Commission.

=== Marijuana Incident in School ===
Williams shocked the world when she revealed on October 2, 2023, that over 60 students who attended a school in Saint Ann were hospitalised after they had eaten candy laced with cannabis. According to the education minister, the children, who were between 7 and 12, were in critical condition in hospital. Williams had shared an image on social media platform X showing a colorful packet of "full throttle rainbow sour belts," each containing 100 milligrams of THC. Jamaica decriminalised cannabis for people over 18 in 2015, with possession of 2 ounces (56 grams) or less downgraded to a petty offense. In the aftermath of the incident Williams had not announced any policy change in response.

=== The Atlantis Leadership Academy Controversy ===
Following allegations of physical abuse involving eight American teenagers, Fayval Williams revealed that Atlantis Leadership Academy in Treasure Beach, St Elizabeth, was not officially registered. The minister made the announcement this during a post-Cabinet press briefing on 17 April 2024 in Kingston. The academy, which presents itself as a faith-based institution, targets teens dealing with substance abuse, anxiety disorders, and deviant behaviour. The eight boys reportedly abused were removed from the school, and five male staff members were charged with offenses related to the abuse. The CPFSA discovered the abuse during an unannounced welfare check on 8 February 2024, conducted with U.S. Embassy representatives, leading to the immediate evacuation of the teens from the academy. At the time Minister Williams stated that all educational institutions serving children must be registered with the Ministry of Education and Youth, highlighting that Atlantis Leadership Academy was operating outside the regulatory framework. She noted that the school had inquired about registration years ago but was never officially registered. The affected children were taken into custody by the Child Protection and Family Services Agency (CPFSA). Randall Cook, founder and director of the academy, has denied all allegations of abuse.

Williams had announced an investigation into a private institution that serves children, similarly to the Atlantis Leadership Academy in Treasure Beach, St. Elizabeth. Although Mrs. Williams did not disclose the name or specific location of the facility, she confirmed that it is registered with the Ministry of Education and Youth.

=== Hurricane Beryl ===
In the aftermath of Hurricane Beryl, Williams disclosed that approximately 100 schools in Jamaica were damaged. She said the damage cost exceeded J$700 million. The education minister told a Cabinet press briefing on 31 July 2024 that due to the urgency of the repair work to be carried out on the affected schools, the ministry would utilize the emergency procurement process to expedite the repairs. A total of 94 schools were classified as high priority for repairs.

=== Other ===
As education and youth minister, Williams opined that it is unlikely that artificial intelligence will replace classroom teachers.

== Ministry of Science, Energy and Technology ==
Williams was appointed minister of science, energy and technology on February 14, 2019, by Prime Minister Andrew Holness. She took over from him after he managed the portfolio for 6 months following the resignation of Dr Andrew Wheatley.

Williams was a part of the negotiating team led by Foreign Affairs Minister Kamina Johnson Smith, negotiating a purchase of Venezuela's 49 percent shares in the Jamaica-state-owned oil refinery Petroleum Corporation of Jamaica. On 30 January 2019, Williams in providing an update on the status of the negotiation with Venezuela, said that there was no agreement between the Government of Jamaica and the Government of Venezuela on the issue of the share buy-back. Subsequent to that announcement by the minister, Prime Minister Andrew Holness on 12 February 2019, tabled legislation (The Compulsory Acquisition (Shares in Petrojam) Act 2019) in the House of Representatives to set in motion to compulsory acquisition of the 49 per cent shares held by PDV Caribe, a subsidiary of the Venezuelan state-owned firm Petroleos de Venezuela (PDVSA).

Upon assuming the portfolio, Williams promised complete transparency in the management of the portfolio. Even though the Jamaica's two recognised newspapers welcomed the appointment of Williams as the new portfolio minister, they have said that her task at the ministry will be "tough".

=== Petroleum Corporation of Jamaica (Petrojam) ===
In her contribution to a bill aim at compulsorily acquire the 49 per cent shares held by PDV Caribe, a subsidiary of the Venezuelan state-owned firm Petroleos de Venezuela (PDVSA), Williams told Parliament on 19 February 2019 that an international firm placed the value of Petrojam at US$34 million. Williams said that a valuation conducted in 2006 by the same firm placed the value at US$126 million.

== Political Representation ==
=== August Town ===
Fayval Williams in an interview publish in The Gleaner on September 21, 2018, said there is potential for the August Town community but expressed frustration that crime is retarding the progress of strides made in the community over the years. "I mean, those are programmes that we should be putting our energies into, but you take one step forward and 10 steps back, and it gets frustrating," she said.

Williams has repeatedly make calls for a Zone of Special Operation (ZOSO) to be declared in August Town. She has expressed concern about the level of violence in the community, revealing that residents there are living in fear due to violence.

== Parliament ==
In the Lower House of Parliament, Fayval Williams sat on the Public Administration and Appropriations Committee (PAAC). The committee has the task of monitoring spending by all Government ministries, departments and agencies. She is also a member of the Human Resource and Social Development Committee.

On 25 July 2017, Williams piloted three Bills in Parliament which allow for tax exemption for listed companies using the share buyback option, The bills which she amended where: The Transfer Tax (Amendment) Act, the Income Tax (Amendment) Act and the Stamp Duty (Amendment) Act. Williams explained to the Parliament that she share repurchase option was introduced through an amendment to the Companies Act in 2004. She argued that there was a discrepancy between the option and the related tax laws, which made it unattractive to shareholders.

== Investment and Brokering ==
=== Jamaica ===
==== Kingston Properties ====
Fayval Williams served as executive director of Kingston Properties, a Real Estate Investment Trust company from 2008 until 2015 when she resigned to take up duties in the Jamaica Labour Party as its caretaker for the constituency of St Andrew Eastern. Fayval, her husband Leo Williams and Stuart White conceptualized the real estate investment company in 2007 to invest in the Carlton Savannah Hotel in Port of Spain, Trinidad, naming the company Carlton Savannah REIT (Jamaica) Limited.

During the 7 years Mrs Williams held the position as executive director, shareholders equity in Kingston Properties grew from J$406.6 million to J$793.6 million at end of June 2015.

===== Settlement =====
In 2016, Fayval Williams got a 32 Million payout from Kingston Properties as settlement for a long-term incentive plan (LTIP), which entitled the executive director to an allocation of shares based on the achievement of certain profit performance targets. The LTIP plan was not implemented and that it was mutually agreed between Williams and the board that the amount of $32.85 million be paid in lieu and in full settlement of the non-implementation of the LTIP.

==== Jamaica Money Market Brokers ====
Williams worked with Jamaica Money Market Brokers Limited (JMMB Ltd) at the senior management level at JMMB. Williams served as chief investment officer of JMMB Limited from 2005 to 2007 with investment responsibilities spanning the trading department, investment research, and pensions. She also led JMMB's endeavour to develop world-class investment research capabilities.

Her other duties at the money market brokers company include interfacing with the Financial Services Commission and the Jamaica Security Dealers Association (JSDA) on issues such as the impact of international accounting standards (particularly IAS39), development of a local Jamaican fixed income yield curve, determining capital adequacy and margin requirement for the local Repo Market. At JMMB, Williams also provided oversight for non-standard lending and served as the Head of the Valuation and Pricing team for JMMB's public offering in December, 2002.

==== Financial Services Commission (FSC) ====
Fayval Williams on her return to Jamaica has consulted with the Financial Services Commission (FSC) in the area of risk management, research and policy. Her working papers included: Regulatory framework for private equity funds in developed capital markets; FSC's Competition Policy Statement; Criteria for Recognizing a Caribbean regional Credit Rating Agency; and The Concept of Accredited Investors in the Jamaican Financial Market. She also worked on the development of early warning ratios for the brokerage industry; performed analytical work on Jamaica's bond price volatility and liquidity management strategies; developed FSC's input into the Memorandum of Understanding of the International Organization of Securities Commission ("IOSCO"); researched comparative information on Educational Savings Plans; led efforts to complete the IOSCO-Self Assessment exercise for the FSC.

=== United States ===
==== Putnam Investments ====
Fayval Williams was a vice president and worked in the area of equity analysis at Putnam Investments, a top-10-global mutual fund manager located in Boston, Massachusetts. Her investment recommendations span various companies in a variety of industries such as advertising, restaurant, global airlines, telecom, direct broadcasting satellite, environmental services, defense, power systems and technology. She published detailed financial forecasts and in-depth company and industry reports used by the various product groups at Putnam. Her stock recommendations outperformed the S&P500 during 1997–2001. She also had portfolio management responsibilities for a segment of a core portfolio product and led Putnam's efforts to incubate a market neutral (hedge) fund.

==== Wellington Management Company ====
At Wellington Management Company in Boston, Massachusetts, Fayval Williams performed analysis and issued various recommendations for an expansive range of fixed income securities covering a broad spectrum of commercial enterprises including Transportation, Paper & Forest Products, Cable, Chemicals, Aerospace & Defense, Autos, and Railroad. Her other fixed income responsibilities included the analysis of asset- backed securities (ABS) and commercial mortgage backed securities (CMBS). Assets under her management grew significantly in these securities as a result of the confidence the portfolio managers had in her work.

==== Northwestern Mutual Life ====
At Northwestern Mutual Life, in Milwaukee, Wisconsin, Williams's responsibilities included daily trading of a wide array of various fixed income securities. She also performed analysis of corporate bonds across the credit spectrum (AAA to CCC). In addition, she also had portfolio management responsibilities for approximately US$3 billion. She was a member of the team that provided macro-economic and market input for both the strategic and tactical portfolio decisions.

== Media Industry ==
=== Nationwide News Network ===
Fayval Williams was the chairman of one of Jamaica's leading media entity Nationwide News Network. She also hosted a daily financial programme on the radio station called Global Markets. On her entry into representational politics, she divested her interest in the media house.

=== ReelRock GSW ===
Williams is a co-founder and director of film animation company ReelRock GSW one of Jamaica’s leading animation studios, started in February 2012 and specializes in delivering animation services to both local and international clients, as well as developing original intellectual property. The company is named after Wayne Sinclair, Lorna Green and Williams.

== Energy Industry ==
Fayval Williams serves as a director of Caribbean Energy Finance Company Ltd (CEFC), a renewable energy company chaired by her husband Leo Williams. Williams also serves as company secretary for CEFC. The company specialises in providing renewable energy solutions through affordable finance options. Its main target are companies around the Caribbean.

== Advocacy and community ==
Fayval Williams is a past president of the Beverly Hills Citizens Association Benevolent Society. She is also a past treasurer of the American Women's Group.

== Other activities ==
Williams is also a member of the Women Business Owners Jamaica Limited group. She participated in a BBC programme with more than 100 organisations in more than 50 countries around the world in the third BBC 100 Women Online International Conversation. She has also served at various levels at the Private Sector Organization of Jamaica (PSOJ) while she was active in the private sector.

== Achievements ==
In December 2017, Businessuite Magazine named Williams the number one CEO in the Caribbean for 2016.

== Personal life ==
Fayval Williams is married to businessman Leo Williams with whom she has two daughters.

== See also ==
- Women in the House of Representatives of Jamaica
- List of education ministers of Jamaica
