= Dave Hume-Brown =

Jamaican politician

MP for Hanover Eastern
- In office 25 February 2016 – 3 September 2025
- Preceded by: Donald Keith Duncan
- Succeeded by: Andrea Purkiss

Personal details
- Political party: Jamaica Labour Party

Dave Hume-Brown is a Jamaican Labour Party politician who was Member of Parliament for Hanover Eastern from 2016 to 2025. He attended Cornwall College.
