= Morland Wilson =

Jamaican politician

Morland Wilson MP

MP for Westmoreland Western
- In office 3 September 2020 – 2025
- Preceded by: Wykeham McNeill

Personal details
- Political party: Jamaica Labour Party
- Education: Manning's School
- Alma mater: University of the West Indies

Morland Wilson is a Jamaican politician from the Labour Party. He served as Member of Parliament for Westmoreland Western after being elected in the 2020 Jamaican general election

== Life and career ==
Wilson was the son of a soldier/farmer and a housewife in Burnt Savannah, attending Samuels Preparatory School and Mannings School before attending the UWI in Kingston. Wilson holds a Master’s degree in Public Administration from the University of the West Indies, Mona. He got his early political exposure in the G2K, rising to the rank of Deputy General Secretary.

He worked with the Ministry of Agriculture and Fisheries, British Council and the European Union principally in the development of programmes and funding for rural and urban enablement, improvement in disenfranchised areas and human rights.

Wilson was elected Member of Parliament for Westmoreland Western in the 2020 Jamaican general election. He was the first JLP candidate to win the seat.

He intended to stand in the 2025 Jamaican general election.
