= Tamika Davis =

Jamaican politician

MP for Hanover Western
- In office 7 September 2020 – 3 September 2025
- Preceded by: Ian Hayles
- Succeeded by: Heatha Miller-Bennett

Personal details
- Political party: Jamaica Labour Party

Tamika Y. Davis is a Jamaican politician and attorney-at-law who served as an MP.

== Early life ==
Davis hails from Middlesex County.

== Education ==
Davis attended the Middlesex Corner Primary School and then Montego Bay High School for Girls in St James before being transferred to Rusea’s High School. She graduated from the University of the West Indies

== Political career ==
Davis defeated Ian Hayles in Hanover Western at the 2020 general election. She was unseated in the 2025 Jamaican general election by Heatha Miller-Bennett.

== Electoral history ==
General Election 2020: Hanover Western
Party	Candidate	Votes	%	±%
JLP	Tamika Davis	6,008	54.6	▲11.1
PNP	Ian Hayles	4,987	45.4	▼10.1
Turnout		10,995		
Registered electors				
JLP gain from PNP				
