= Natalie Campbell Rodriques =

Jamaican politician and diplomat

Natalie Campbell Rodriques is a Jamaican politician and diplomat who has served as High Commissioner to Trinidad and Tobago since 19 August 2023.

She previously served as a Labour Party member of the Senate of Jamaica.
