= Alfred Dawes =

Jamaican politician

Dr. Alfred Dawes MP

Shadow Minister of Health and Wellness
- Incumbent
- Assumed office January 2024

MP for Saint Catherine South Eastern
- Incumbent
- Assumed office 3 September 2025
- Preceded by: Robert Miller

Personal details
- Born: January 4, 1981 (age 45) Saint Catherine, Jamaica
- Party: People's National Party
- Spouse: Latoya Dawes
- Education: University of the West Indies (MBBS, MD); Munro College
- Medical career
- Profession: Neurosurgeon
- Institutions: University of the West Indies
- Sub-specialties: Bariatric surgery

Alfred Patrick Dawes is a Jamaican politician from the People's National Party who has been MP for Saint Catherine South Eastern since 2025.

Dawes is a medical doctor by profession. He was Opposition Spokesperson on Health and Wellness.
