= Phillip Henriques =

Jamaican politician

MP for Clarendon North Western
- In office 7 September 2020 – 3 September 2025
- Preceded by: Richard Azan
- Succeeded by: Richard Azan

Personal details
- Party: Jamaica Labour Party

Phillip Henriques is a Jamaican politician, who has represented Clarendon North Western in the Parliament of Jamaica since 2020.

== Political career ==
Henriques was elected on a recount defeating incumbent MP Richard Azan.
