= Robert Miller (Jamaican politician) =

Jamaican politician

Robert Miller MP

MP for Saint Catherine South Eastern
- In office 7 September 2020 – 3 September 2025
- Preceded by: Colin Fagan
- Succeeded by: Alfred Dawes

Personal details
- Political party: Jamaica Labour Party

Robert Miller is a Jamaican Labour Party politician who was Member of Parliament for Saint Catherine South Eastern from 2020 to 2025.
