= Ian Hayles =

Jamaican politician (born 1972)

Member of the Jamaican Parliament for Westmoreland Western
- Incumbent
- Assumed office 3 September 2025

Member of the Jamaican Parliament for Hanover Western
- In office 2007–2020

Personal details
- Born: 1972 (age 53–54) Westmoreland, Jamaica
- Party: People's National Party

Ian Dave Hayles (born 1972) is a Jamaican politician with the People's National Party. He was a Member of the Parliament of Jamaica since 2007 before losing his seat to Jamaica Labour Party Candidate and Attorney-at-Law, Tamika Davis, at the 2020 Jamaican general election.

He is later re-elected in 2025.

== Career ==
Hayles returned to Jamaica from abroad hoping in 2000 to contribute to Jamaica's development, and wrote to PNP Prime Minister P. J. Patterson with the aim of getting involved in politics. However he ended up joining the Jamaica Labour Party instead. He rose to the position of president of the JLP affiliate group Generation 2000, but in the end resigned from the JLP along with Norman Horne and ran under the PNP banner for the Hanover Western seat in the September 2007 election. His victory made him one of the youngest MPs.

However, soon after the election the defeated JLP candidate Donovan Hamilton filed an election petition in the Supreme Court, challenging Hayles' eligibility to be nominated due to his U.S. citizenship. On 23 October 2007, Hayles swore an oath of renunciation of U.S. nationality and submitted his U.S. passport for cancellation; the U.S. State Department later issued him a Certificate of Loss of Nationality dated 25 October 2007. The court case still was not resolved by January 2012, though there were suggestions that Hamilton and Hayles might settle.

After the December 2011 election, PM Portia Simpson-Miller appointed Hayles the new State Minister of Agriculture and Fisheries under minister Roger Clarke.

== Personal life ==
Hayles was born in George's Plain, Westmoreland Parish, a PNP stronghold. His mother Pauline Brown was an organiser for the PNP. He later moved to Blenheim, Hanover Parish and then to Cave Hill in the same parish, and then emigrated to the United States with his family at age 13. He attended university there before returning to Jamaica.
