= Andrea Purkiss =

Jamaican politician

MP for Hanover Eastern
- Incumbent
- Assumed office 3 September 2025
- Preceded by: Dave Hume-Brown

Personal details
- Party: People's National Party

Andrea Purkiss is a Jamaican politician from the People's National Party who has been MP for Hanover Eastern since 2025.

Purkiss unseated incumbent MP Dave Hume-Brown. Purkiss is a tourism executive.

== See also ==
- 15th Parliament of Jamaica
