= Sherene Golding Campbell =

Jamaican politician

Member of the Senate of Jamaica
- Incumbent
- Assumed office September 2020

Personal details
- Born: Sherene Samantha Golding; December 28 1972
- Party: Jamaica Labour Party
- Parent(s): Bruce Golding (father); Lorna Golding (mother)
- Education: Immaculate Conception High School; United World Colleges; Howard University; Norman Manley Law School

Sherene Samantha Golding Campbell is a Jamaican politician from the Labour Party, who has served as a member of the Senate of Jamaica since September 2020.

Golding Campbell's father is former Prime Minister of Jamaica Bruce Golding.
