= Hanover Eastern =

Jamaican parliamentary constituency

Hanover Eastern is a parliamentary constituency represented in the House of Representatives of the Jamaican Parliament. It elects one Member of Parliament (MP) by the first past the post system of election. It was one of the 32 constituencies fixed in the new constitution granted to Jamaica in 1944. The constituency has featured in all 16 contested Parliamentary General Elections from 1944 to 2016. The current MP is Dave Hume-Brown, representing the Jamaica Labour Party, who has been in office since 2016.

== Boundaries ==
The constituency covers three electoral divisions – Sandy Bay, Hopewell, and Chester Castle.

== Members of Parliament ==
=== 1944 to Present ===
Election	Member	Party
1944	Joseph Malcolm	Independent
1949	Joseph Malcolm	Jamaica Labour Party
1955	Joseph Malcolm	Jamaica Labour Party
1959	Eric Campbell	People's National Party
1962	Arnold Jackson	Jamaica Labour Party
1967	Arnold Jackson	Jamaica Labour Party
1972	Arnold Jackson	Jamaica Labour Party
1976	Aston King	People's National Party
1980	Basil Buck	Jamaica Labour Party
1983	Basil Buck	Jamaica Labour Party
1989	Aston King	People's National Party
1993	Francis Tulloch	People's National Party
1997	Canute Brown	People's National Party
2002	Barrington Gray	Jamaica Labour Party
2007	D. K. Duncan	People's National Party
2011	D. K. Duncan	People's National Party
2016	Dave Hume-Brown	Jamaica Labour Party
2020	Dave Hume-Brown	Jamaica Labour Party
2025	Andrea Purkiss	People's National Party

== Elections ==
=== Elections from 2000 to Present ===
General Election 2020: Hanover Eastern
Party	Candidate	Votes	%	±%
JLP	Dave Hume-Brown	5,972	57.7	▲6.7
PNP	Wynter McIntosh	4,377	42.3	▼6.0
Turnout		10,349		
Registered electors				
JLP hold				

General Election 2016: Hanover Eastern
Party	Candidate	Votes	%	±%
JLP	Dave Hume-Brown	6,386	51.0	▲2.1
PNP	Wynter McIntosh	6,046	48.3	▼2.4
Turnout		12,528	53.0	▼9.3
Registered electors		23,618		▲8.8
JLP gain from PNP				

General Election 2011: Hanover Eastern
Party	Candidate	Votes	%	±%
PNP	D. K. Duncan	6,853	50.7	
JLP	Paula Kerr-Jarrett	6,602	48.9	
Turnout		13,513	62.3	
Registered electors		21,699		
PNP hold				

== See also ==
- Politics of Jamaica
- Elections in Jamaica
