= Dayton Campbell =

Jamaican politician

Member of the Jamaican Parliament for Westmoreland Eastern
- Incumbent
- Assumed office 2025
- Succeeded by: Krystal Lee

MP for Saint Ann North Western
- In office 2011–2020

Personal details
- Born: April 1983 (age 43)
- Party: People's National Party
- Education: University of the West Indies; University of London (LLB)

Dayton Ricardo Campbell is a Jamaican politician who is Secretary of the People's National Party (PNP). He was MP for Saint Ann North Western from 2011 to 2020.

In the 2025 Jamaican general election, he is the PNP candidate in Westmoreland Eastern.
