= Kerensia Morrison =

Jamaican politician

The Honourable Kerensia Morrison MP

Minister of State in the Ministry of Culture, Gender, Entertainment and Sport
- Incumbent
- Assumed office September 2025

Member of the Senate of Jamaica
- In office 2016–2020

MP for Saint Catherine North Eastern
- Incumbent
- Assumed office 7 September 2020
- Preceded by: Leslie Campbell

Personal details
- Party: Jamaica Labour Party
- Education: University of the West Indies; University of the West Indies (BLitt); The Mico University College

Kerensia Morrison is a Jamaican Labour Party politician who has been Member of Parliament for Saint Catherine North Eastern since 2020.

She sat in the Senate of Jamaica from 2016 to 2020.
