= Jamaica Money Market Brokers =

Caribbean investment firm

Jamaica Money Market Brokers (JMMB)
- Company type: Investment Bank and Remittance.
- Industry: Finance
- Founded: November 1992
- Founder: Joan Duncan
- Key people: Keith Duncan
- Products: banking, remittances, insurance brokering, individual and corporate and institutional clients.
- Total assets: $3 Billion (US)

Jamaica Money Market Brokers (JMMB) is a Jamaican based, Caribbean investment firm, operating in Trinidad and Tobago, the Dominican Republic as well as Barbados.

It is considered responsible for the development of the secondary money market for debt in Jamaica.

Founded in November 1992 by Joan Duncan, JMMB is headquartered in Kingston, Jamaica, with regional offices in Trinidad, the Dominican Republic, as well as Barbados.
