= Donna Scott-Mottley =

Jamaican politician

Donna Marie Scott-Mottley (previously Scott-Bhoorasingh; born 6 October 1956 in Westmoreland Parish) is a Jamaican politician from the People's National Party.

== Career ==
She was the candidate in Clarendon Central in the 1989 Jamaican general election. She served in the Senate of Jamaica in the 1990s, before returning on 3 November 2005, replacing Keste Miller.

She works as an attorney-at-law.

== See also ==
- 14th Parliament of Jamaica
