= Donald Buchanan =

Jamaican politician

Donald Barrington Buchanan or Danny Buck (born in Saint Elizabeth Parish on September 28, 1942 – died January 10, 2011) was a former Minister of Labour and Social Security for Jamaica. He also served in the Parliament of Jamaica where he represented St. Elizabeth South Western. He died of Colorectal cancer. His son is also a politician.
