= Saint Catherine South Eastern =

Parliamentary constituency of Jamaica

Saint Catherine South East is number 49 on this map.

Saint Catherine South Eastern is a parliamentary constituency represented in the Parliament of Jamaica. It elects one Member of Parliament by the first past the post system of election. The constituency covers the south eastern part of Saint Catherine Parish. It has been represented by Robert Miller from the Jamaica Labour Party since the 2020 general election

== Members of Parliament ==
- Carl Rattray of the PNP (1989–1993)
- Colin Fagan of the PNP (2007 to 2020)
- Alfred Dawes of the PNP (since 2025)
