= Hanover Western =

Jamaican parliamentary constituency

Hanover Western is a parliamentary constituency represented in the House of Representatives of the Jamaican Parliament. It elects one Member of Parliament (MP) by the first past the post system of election. It was one of the 32 constituencies fixed in the new constitution granted to Jamaica in 1944. The constituency has featured in all 16 contested Parliamentary General Elections from 1944 to 2016. The current MP is Heatha Miller-Bennett.

The MP was formerly Ian Hayles, representing the People's National Party, who had been in office from 2007 to 2020.

== Boundaries ==
The constituency covers four electoral divisions – Cauldwell, Green Island, Lucea and Riverside.

== Members of Parliament ==
=== 1944 to present ===
Election	Member	Party
1944	Felix Veitch	Jamaica Labour Party
1949	William Dickson	Jamaica Labour Party
1955	William Dickson	Jamaica Labour Party
1959	Lascelles Murray	People's National Party
1962	Agustus Stanhope	Jamaica Labour Party
1967	Cleveland Stanhope	Jamaica Labour Party
1972	Roy Robinson	People's National Party
1976	Roy Robinson	People's National Party
1980	Horace Chang	Jamaica Labour Party
1983	Horace Chang	Jamaica Labour Party
1989	Benjamin Clare	People's National Party
1993	Benjamin Clare	People's National Party
1997	Benjamin Clare	People's National Party
2002	Anson Ralston	People's National Party
2007	Ian Hayles	People's National Party
2011	Ian Hayles	People's National Party
2016	Ian Hayles	People's National Party
2020	Tamika Davis	Jamaica Labour Party
2025	Heatha Miller-Bennett	People's National Party

== Elections ==
=== Elections from 2000 to present ===
General Election 2020: Hanover Western
Party	Candidate	Votes	%	±%
JLP	Tamika Davis	6,008	54.6	▲11.1
PNP	Ian Hayles	4,987	45.4	▼10.1
Turnout		10,995		
Registered electors				
JLP gain from PNP				

General Election 2016: Hanover Western
Party	Candidate	Votes	%	±%
PNP	Ian Hayles	6,829	55.5	▲0.4
JLP	Brian Wallace	5,358	43.5	▼0.8
NDM	Leonard Sharpe	27	0.2	
Turnout		12,307	40.3	▼15.4
Registered electors		30,528		▲9.5
PNP hold				

General Election 2011: Hanover Western
Party	Candidate	Votes	%	±%
PNP	Ian Hayles	8,583	55.1	
JLP	Donovan Hamilton	6,905	44.3	
Turnout		15,584	55.7	
Registered electors		27,983		
PNP hold				

== See also ==
- Politics of Jamaica
- Elections in Jamaica
