= Manchester Central (Jamaica Parliament constituency) =

Parliamentary constituency of Jamaica

Manchester Central is number 18 on the map.

Manchester Central is a parliamentary constituency represented in the House of Representatives of the Jamaican Parliament. It elects one Member of Parliament (MP) by the first past the post system of election. It is located in Manchester Parish. The former MP was Peter Bunting from the People's National Party.

== Representation ==
- John Junor (until 2007)
- Peter Bunting (2007 to 2020)
- Rhoda Moy-Crawford (since 2020)
