= Kavan Gayle =

Jamaican politician

Kavan A. Gayle is a Jamaican politician from the Labour Party, who currently serves as a member of the Senate of Jamaica.
