= Lambert Brown =

Jamaican politician

Lambert Brown is a member of the Senate of Jamaica from the People's National Party. He is a member of the Shadow Cabinet of Jamaica.

== Political views ==
Brown is an advocate for a higher minimum wage.
