= Saint Catherine South Western =

Parliamentary constituency in Jamaica

Saint Catherine South Western is a parliamentary constituency represented in the Parliament of Jamaica. It elects one Member of Parliament by the first past the post system of election. The constituency covers the south western part of Saint Catherine Parish. It has been represented by Everald Warmington of the Jamaica Labour Party since 2002.

== MPs ==
- Jennifer Edwards - People's National Party (1997-2002)
- Everald Warmington - Jamaica Labour Party (2002-present)
