= Charles Sinclair Jr. =

Jamaican politician

Senator The Honourable Charles Sinclair Jr. OD CD

Deputy President of the Senate
- Incumbent
- Assumed office 14 September 2020
- President: Tom Tavares-Finson

Mayor of Montego Bay
- In office 2008–2012
- Preceded by: Noel Donaldson
- Succeeded by: Homer Davis

Personal details
- Party: JLP

Charles Anthony Sinclair Jr. is a Jamaican politician from the Labour Party. He is a member of the Senate of Jamaica and is Deputy President of the Senate.

In addition, he is the councillor for the Montego Bay North East Division. Senator/Councillor Charles Sinclair is a former Mayor of Montego Bay.
