= Constitution of Jamaica =

- The Coat of Arms of Jamaica

Overview
- Jurisdiction: Jamaica
- Date effective: 6 August 1962
- System: Unitary parliamentary constitutional monarchy

Government structure
- Branches: Parliament; Executive government; Judicature
- Chambers: House of Representatives; Senate
- Executive: Cabinet of Jamaica
- Judiciary: Judiciary of Jamaica
- Federalism: Unitary
- Supersedes: 1959 Jamaica Constitution

The Constitution of Jamaica is the collection of laws made by the government. It is the supreme law of Jamaica.

It was drafted by a bipartisan joint committee of the Jamaican legislature in 1961–62, approved in the United Kingdom and included as the Second Schedule of the Jamaica (Constitution) Order in Council, 1962 under the West Indies Act, 1962. It came into force with the Jamaica Independence Act, 1962 of the Parliament of the United Kingdom, which transformed Jamaica into a sovereign state and independent constitutional monarchy with Elizabeth II as head of state and Queen of Jamaica.
