= Clarendon North Western =

Parliamentary constituency of Jamaica

Clarendon North Western is a parliamentary constituency represented in the House of Representatives of the Jamaican Parliament. It elects one Member of Parliament (MP) by the first past the post system of election. It is located in Clarendon Parish.

== Representatives ==
- Until 2020 - Richard Azan (PNP)
- From 2020 - Phillip Henriquez (JLP)
