= Clarendon North Central =

Parliamentary constituency of Jamaica

Clarendon North Central is a parliamentary constituency represented in the House of Representatives of the Jamaican Parliament. It elects one Member of Parliament (MP) by the first past the post system of election. It is located in Clarendon Parish.

== Representation ==
- Pearnel Charles (JLP) 2002 to 2020
- Robert Nesta Morgan (JLP) from 2020
