= BLitt =

BLitt may refer to:

- Bachelor of Letters, a second bachelor's degree awarded in Australia, Brazil, UK, and US
- Bachelor of Literature, the statutory bachelor's degree in literature studies awarded in China
