= Saint Ann North Western =

Parliamentary constituency of Jamaica

Saint Ann North Western is a parliamentary constituency represented in the House of Representatives of the Jamaican Parliament. It elects one Member of Parliament by the first past the post system of election. The constituency consists of the north-west part of Saint Ann Parish. It is represented by Jamaica Labour Party MP Krystal Lee.

== Members of Parliament ==
- Arnold Bertram (until 1980)
- Princess Lawes (1980–1989)
- Burchell Whiteman (1989 to 2007)
- Dayton Campbell (until 2020)
- Krystal Lee (2020 to present)
