= Saint Andrew North Central =

Parliamentary constituency of Jamaica

Saint Andrew North Central is a parliamentary constituency represented in the House of Representatives of the Jamaican Parliament. It elects one Member of Parliament MP by the first past the post system of election.

== Members ==
- Karl Samuda since the 1980 Jamaican general election.
- Delano Seiveright since the 2025 Jamaican general election

== Boundaries ==
Includes the communities of Norbrook and Whitehall.

General Election 2007: Saint Andrew North Central
Party	Candidate	Votes	%	±%
JLP	Karl Samuda	6,090	63.57	
PNP	Christopher Munroe	3,490	36.43	
Total votes		9,580	100.0	
Turnout			58.84	
JLP hold				
