= Aubyn Hill =

Jamaican politician

Senator The Honourable Aubyn Hill
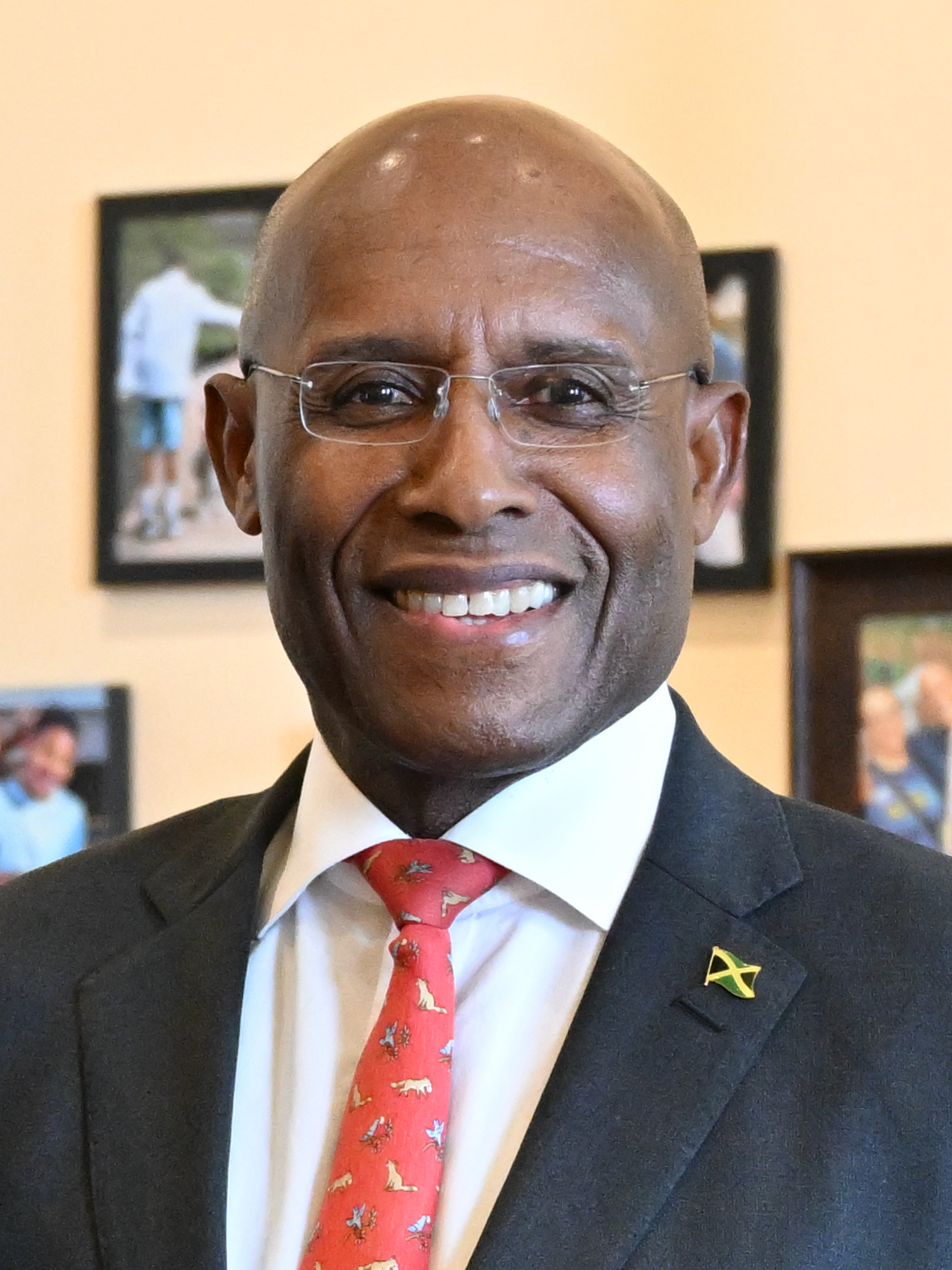

Minister of Industry, Investment and Commerce
- Incumbent
- Assumed office January 11, 2022

Member of the Senate of Jamaica
- Incumbent
- Assumed office March 2016

Personal details
- Party: Jamaican Labour Party
- Children: 2
- Education: Harvard Business School (MBA)

Aubyn Rochester Hill is a Jamaican politician from the Labour Party. He is a member of the Senate of Jamaica.

== Political career ==
He was appointed Minister of Industry, Investment and Commerce in the Cabinet of Jamaica in January 2022. He earned an MBA from Harvard Business School.
