= Marlon Morgan =

Jamaican politician

Senator The Honourable Marlon Morgan

Parliamentary Secretary in the Minister of Education, Youth and Information
- Incumbent
- Assumed office 19 September 2025

Member of the Senate of Jamaica
- Incumbent
- Assumed office September 2025

Personal details
- Born: November 28, 1982 (age 43) Wood Hall, Saint Catherine, Jamaica
- Party: Jamaica Labour Party
- Education: Kingston College
- Alma mater: deCarteret College; University of the West Indies

Marlon Andre Morgan is a Jamaican politician from the Labour Party who currently serves as Parliamentary Secretary of the Ministry of Education, Youth, Skills and Information and a member of the Senate of Jamaica since 2025. a

Morgan was educated at Kingston College and graduated University of the West Indies in 2007.
