= Generation 2000 =

Centre-right political youth organisation in Jamaica

Generation 2000 (G2K) is the young professional affiliate of the Jamaica Labour Party (JLP). It is a Center-Right political Youth Organization that was founded in 2000 by a group of young professionals that saw a need for professional politics in Jamaica. The organization was incorporated as a corporate non-profit body, with a board of directors chaired by Dr. David Panton in the year 2000. The current President of Generation 2000 is Sashana-Lee Edwards, a business woman, who was the first woman elected as President of the organization.

Presidents of Generation 2000 typically become Members of Parliament, Senators and Constituency Caretakers in Government of Jamaica.

PRESIDENT	Term In Office	Roles Played in Government of Jamaica
Sashana-Lee Edwards	2026-Present	
Shayne Kerr	2022-2026	
Ryan Strachan	2019-2022	
Stephen Edwards	2016–2019	Managing Director - National Road Operating and Constructing Company Limited (NROCC)
Matthew Samuda	2015-2016	Government Senator/Minister without Portfolio in the Ministry of National Security
Floyd Green	2012-2015	Member of Parliament / Minister of State in the Ministry of Education
Delano Seiveright	2009-2012	Constituency Caretaker / Senior Adviser Ministry of Tourism
Warren Newby	2006-2007	Government Senator
Christopher Tufton	2003-2005	Government Senator / Member of Parliament / Minister of Agriculture / Minister of Health
Ronald Robinson	2002-2003	Government Senator
David Panton	2000-2002	Government Senator
