= Abka Fitz-Henley =

Jamaican politician

Abka Lincoln Ramon Fitz-Henley (born January 17, 1989) is a Jamaican politician from the Labour Party and multiple award-winning former media practitioner, who has served as a member of the Senate of Jamaica since May 2023.

Senator Fitz-Henley is State Minister in the Office of the Prime Minister and Chairman of the Jamaica Labour Party's Communication Taskforce.

Fitz-Henley formerly worked as a radio host and journalist for Nationwide News Network.

== Career ==
In January 2022, Fitz-Henley walked away from broadcast media where he had hosted a popular current affairs morning show on Nationwide News Network and became known as "The Breaking News Boss", bringing the curtains down on a thirteen year media career which began when he was 20 years old.

Over the course of this media career Fitz-Henley accumulated over 15 awards. During his first year in media, Fitz-Henley was recognized with the Young Journalist of the year award from The Press Association of Jamaica (PAJ) and in 2016 went on to cop one of the country’s highest recognized journalism prizes, the PAJ National Journalist of the Year Award.

He was the final recipient of the prestigious corporate Jamaica Broilers Fairplay 1st place Award for investigative journalism and is the recipient of the Caribbean Blog Award for coverage of the infamous Kartel murder trial.
