= Westmoreland Western =

Jamaican Constituency

Westmoreland Western is a parliamentary constituency represented in the House of Representatives of the Parliament of Jamaica. It elects one Member of Parliament (MP) by the first past the post system of election. It was one of the 32 constituencies fixed in the new constitution granted to Jamaica in 1944. Unlike Westmoreland Eastern, which was phased out when the constituency boundaries were redrawn in 1966, this seat remained and has featured in all 16 contested Parliamentary General Elections 1944 to 2016. The MP was Hon. Dr. Wykeham McNeill of the People's National Party from 1997 to 2020.

Morland Wilson from the Jamaica Labour Party defeated McNeill in the 2020 general election in one of the most shocking losses in the PNP camp.
