= Rhoda Moy Crawford =

Jamaican politician

Minister of State in the Ministry of Education, Youth, Skills and Information
- Incumbent
- Assumed office September 2025
- Minister: Dana Morris Dixon

MP for Manchester Central
- Incumbent
- Assumed office 7 September 2020
- Governor-General: Patrick Linton Allen
- Prime Minister: Andrew Holness
- Preceded by: Peter Bunting
- Constituency: Manchester Central

Personal details
- Born: 1988 (age 37–38)
- Party: Jamaica Labour Party
- Education: University of the West Indies (BEd, MEd)

Rhoda Moy Crawford (born 1988) is a Jamaican politician, who is currently the Jamaica Labour Party Member of Parliament for Manchester Central. She was first elected in the landslide 2020 general election.

== Political career ==
Crawford defeated incumbent MP Peter Bunting.
