= Saint Catherine North Eastern =

Parliamentary constituency of Jamaica

Saint Catherine North East is a parliamentary constituency represented in the Parliament of Jamaica. It elects one Member of Parliament by the first past the post system of election. The constituency covers the north east part of Saint Catherine Parish. It is currently represented by Kerensia Morrison from the Jamaica Labour Party.

== Boundaries ==
Constituency covers Mount Industry, Troja and Guys Hill.

General Election 2007: Saint Catherine North East
| Party | Candidate | Votes | % | ±% |
|---|---|---|---|---|
| JLP | Gregory Mair | 5,996 | 53.87 | |
| PNP | Phyllis Mitchell | 5,134 | 46.13 | |
| Total votes | | 11,130 | 100.0 | |
| Turnout | | | 60.86 | |
| JLP gain from PNP | | | | |

General Election 2020: Saint Catherine North East
| Party | Candidate | Votes | % | ±% |
|---|---|---|---|---|
| JLP | Kerensia Morrison | 5,980 | 64.35 | |
| PNP | Oswest Senior-Smith | 3,312 | 35.64 | |
| Total votes | | 9,292 | 100.0 | |
