= Peter Bunting =

Jamaican politician

Honourable Peter Bunting MP
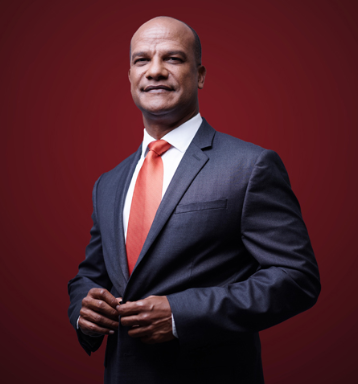

Minister of National Security
- In office 5 January 2012 – February 2016
- Monarch: Elizabeth II
- Governor General: Patrick Allen
- Preceded by: Dwight Nelson
- Succeeded by: Robert Montague

Member of Parliament for Manchester Central
- In office 11 September 2007 – 3 September 2020
- Preceded by: John Junor
- Succeeded by: Rhoda Moy-Crawford

Member of Parliament for Manchester Southern
- Incumbent
- Assumed office 3 September 2025
- Preceded by: Robert Chin

Member of Parliament for Clarendon South Eastern
- In office 30 March 1993 – 18 December 1998
- Preceded by: Hugh Shearer
- Succeeded by: Basil Burrell

Personal details
- Born: Peter Murcott Bunting; 7 September 1960 (age 66) Clarendon, Jamaica
- Party: People's National Party
- Education: McGill University (BEng); University of Florida (MBA)

Peter Murcott Bunting, MP (born 7 September 1960) was the fifth National Security Minister of Jamaica (Jan 2012 - Feb 2016) and the Former Member of Parliament representing the constituency of Central Manchester. Bunting was the General Secretary of the People's National Party, a position which he has held from January 2008 to January 2014. In the 2020 People's National Party leadership election, Bunting was the lead contender in the polls before the PNP's stunning defeat in the 2020 Jamaican general election, in which he lost his Manchester Central seat in Jamaica's parliament.

== Early life and education ==
Bunting was born 7 September 1960 in a rural district in Clarendon, Jamaica, to farmers, Juan and Pauline Bunting. He attended Campion College, Jamaica (1971–1979), a renowned high school in Kingston. After completing high school, Bunting pursued undergraduate studies in mechanical engineering at McGill University in Canada (1983), where he received the James McGill Award and the Quebec Iron and Titanium Scholarship for academic achievement. Two years later, he earned an MBA in finance from the University of Florida, where he was conferred the esteemed title of Matherly Scholar.

== Early professional career ==
As a young MBA graduate, Bunting gained employment at Citibank (1985–1987), where he worked first, as an accounting officer of the Corporate Banking Group, and then as Manager of Specialized Finance. The business prowess with which he operated attracted the attention of prominent Jamaican businessmen O.K. Melhado and Clifton Cameron, who recruited him in 1988 to establish Manufacturers' Merchant Bank (MMB). Bunting headed the MMB as chief executive officer, and through his strategic direction, along with the support from other creditable bankers, MMB became the largest independent merchant bank in Jamaica. Known today as Pan Caribbean Investment Services, MMB continued to grow and posted profits. In 1990, Bunting took a hiatus from banking to undertake a political career.

== Political life ==
Bunting was hired as personal advisor to then prime minister, Michael Manley in 1990. Following from his post as advisor, he was appointed CEO of the National Investment Bank of Jamaica, now known as Development Bank of Jamaica (DBJ).

== The establishment of Dehring, Bunting and Golding (DB&G) Ltd. ==
An investment banker by profession, Bunting returned to banking. This time he would collaborate with two long-time friends, Christopher Dehring and Mark Golding, to establish Jamaica's first private sector investment banking firm, Dehring, Bunting and Golding (now Scotia Investments) in 1992. DB&G gained monumental success, catapulting itself to being one of the most reputable banks in Jamaica and the Caribbean. The investment house gained a reputation for progressiveness and innovation and gained widespread consumer confidence. Under Bunting's stewardship, DB&G went on to win awards on the Jamaica Stock Exchange for being the best performing company in 2005 and 2006 then later the Governor General's Award for excellence in 2006.

Achieving sustained success, DB&G attracted the attention of one of Jamaica's most profitable commercial banks, the Bank of Nova Scotia (BNS). The principals of DB&G and BNS later came to an agreement in 2006, which saw BNS acquiring DB&G, renaming it Scotia DBG, and later Scotia Investments.

== Representational politics ==
Bunting's desire to serve the Jamaican populace in a more meaningful way, led to his return to politics. This time however, saw him representing the PNP in the 1993 Jamaican general election for the South East Clarendon constituency. Although traditionally a Jamaica Labour Party (JLP) stronghold, Bunting won the seat, ousting JLP candidate and former Prime Minister of Jamaica, the Most Honourable Hugh Shearer. He served as Member of Parliament until 1998; after which he reverted to his career in banking to take up the lead role in DB&G. Bunting lost his Manchester Central seat to the Jamaica Labour Party's Rhoda Moy-Crawford in 2020, which he first won in 2007. Deemed a 'stunning defeat' by the Jamaica-Gleaner, Bunting won 7,112 votes to Crawford's 8,097. Bunting's party, the People's National Party, had held the seat since in 1989.

== Launch of Proven Investment Limited ==
In 2010, Bunting re-entered the financial services sector to launch Proven Investments Limited, an investment company with a portfolio of regional and international securities. Bunting served as chairman of the board, which subsequently acquired Guardian Asset Management and was renamed Proven Wealth Limited (PWL). Bunting resigned his position after being sworn in as Jamaica's Minister of National Security in January 2012.

== Minister of National Security ==
Peter Bunting was appointed Minister of National Security on 6 January 2012. During his assignment as Minister, he embarked on a strategic programme of policy reform at the Ministry, as a response to Jamaica's national security challenges, both existing and potential.

National Security was familiar territory for Minister Bunting, as prior to assuming duties as minister, he served in the capacity of Opposition Spokesman on National Security, a position he held from 2008. During his tenure as Opposition Spokesman, he actively participated in the National Security Council, where he was vocal on the many issues compromising the country's national security. He also played an instrumental role in the Bi-partisan Working Group established to develop a framework for the Police Management Authority (PMA).

As Opposition Spokesman he was also an active opponent of the death penalty, an issue on which he has presented in Parliament. He was also a lead agitator of the no confidence motion brought against then Prime Minister, Bruce Golding, after his integrity was brought into question based on his handling of the Christopher 'Dudus' Coke extradition case.

== Public sector involvement ==
In addition to his role in representational politics, Bunting has served many public sector bodies in varying capacities. He has served as chairman for the National Water Commission, parliamentary secretary in the Ministry of Health, president and CEO of the National Investment Bank of Jamaica (Now Development Bank of Jamaica DBJ), and chairman of JAMPRO. As the former general secretary before Julian Robinson, he had also represented the party as a commissioner of the Electoral Commission of Jamaica (2008 to 2016).
