= Krystal Lee =

Jamaican politician

The Honourable Krystal Lee MP

Minister of State in the Ministry of Health and Wellness
- Incumbent
- Assumed office September 2025
- Minister: Christopher Tufton

MP for Saint Ann North Western
- Incumbent
- Assumed office 7 September 2020
- Preceded by: Dayton Campbell

Personal details
- Born: June 30, 1984 (age 42)
- Party: Jamaica Labour Party
- Education: Walden University (DBA); California State University (MSA); University of Technology, Jamaica (BSc)

Krystal Lee (born 1984) is a Jamaican Labour Party politician currently serving as Member of Parliament for Saint Ann North Western.

== Political career ==
In the 2020 general election, she defeated incumbent People's National Party MP Dayton Campbell. She was re-elected in the 2025 Jamaican general election and was appointed Minister of State in the Ministry of Health and Wellness by Prime Minister Andrew Holness.

She is an advocate for renovation of Brown's Town.
