= Tom Tavares-Finson =

Jamaican senator (born 1953)

Senator the Honourable Tom Tavares-Finson OJ CD KC JP
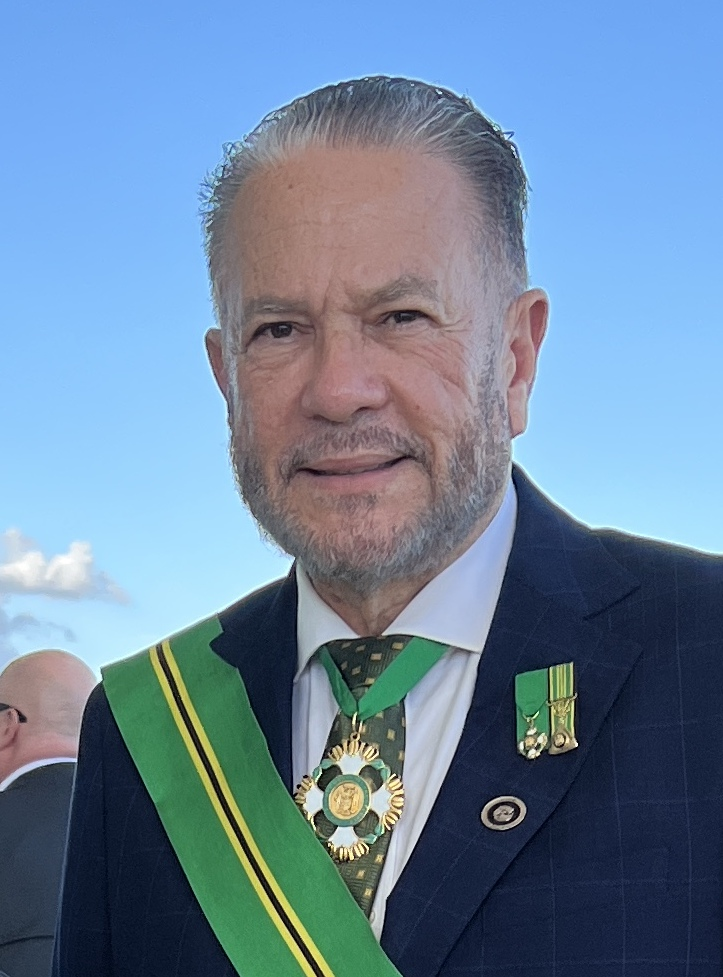
- Tavares-Finson in 2023

President of the Senate of Jamaica
- Incumbent
- Assumed office 10 March 2016
- Deputy: Charles Sinclair Jr.
- Preceded by: Floyd Morris

Personal details
- Born: 7 July 1953 (age 73) Kingston, Colony of Jamaica
- Party: Labour
- Spouse(s): Rose Costantini; Cynthia Jean Cameron Breakspeare (1981–1995)
- Relations: Clem Tavares (uncle)
- Children: 5

Thomas Tavares-Finson (born 7 July 1953) is a Jamaican lawyer and politician who has been the President of the Senate of Jamaica since 2016, and a member of the Senate since 2007. He has been a member of the Electoral Commission of Jamaica since 2006.

== Early life and education ==
Thomas Tavares-Finson was born on 7 July 1953. He was educated at Jamaica College, McMaster University, Institute of Commonwealth Studies, and the University of London.

== Career ==
Tavares-Finson was admitted to the English bar in 1979, the Jamaica Bar in 1981, and is a member of the Middle Temple. He is a justice of the peace and a notary public.

The Jamaican Labour Party ran Tavares-Finson as a candidate in the 1993 Jamaican general election. On 12 March 1993, he led a group of supporters to the office of the People's National Party (PNP) in the North Central St. Andrew Constituency. A fight broke out between the JLP and PNP supporters and resulted in two men being shot and a police officer being stabbed.

Tavares-Finson was a member of the Electoral Advisory Committee from 2005 to 2006, and he became a member of the Electoral Commission of Jamaica in 2006. He was a member of the JLP's central executive and standing committees. He is currently the chair of the National Gallery of Jamaica.

Tavares-Finson was a member of the Senate in the 1980 session, and returned in 2007. He was elected Deputy President of the Senate in 2007. He was in charge of the opposition business in the Senate. He succeeded Floyd Morris as President of the Senate on 10 March 2016 and reelected on 15 September 2020.

== Personal life ==
Tavares-Finson married Cindy Breakspeare, who had an affair with Bob Marley. In 1998, he married Rose Costantini. He had two children with Breakspeare and two with Costantini. His son, Christian Tavares-Finson, ran for a seat in the House of Representatives in 2025.

The Order of Jamaica was awarded to Tavares-Finson in 2020.

== Works cited ==
=== News ===
- "JLP to select candidate for St. Andrew North Central this week". Radio Jamaica News. 14 May 2025. Archived from the original on 29 June 2025.
- "Tavares Finson next President of the Senate". Jamaica Observer. 6 March 2016. Archived from the original on 29 June 2025.
- Barrett, Courtney (13 March 1993). "2 men shot, cop stabbed". The Gleaner. p. 2.
- Silvera, Janet (24 February 2014). "Cindy says goodbye to Bob, pays tribute to Tom". The Gleaner. Archived from the original on 29 June 2025.

=== Web ===
- "Jamaica". Inter-Parliamentary Union. Archived from the original on 29 June 2025.
- "President of the Senate". Parliament of Jamaica. Archived from the original on 29 June 2025.
- "Tom Tavares-Finson". Electoral Commission of Jamaica. Archived from the original on 5 January 2012.
