= Gordon House (Jamaica) =

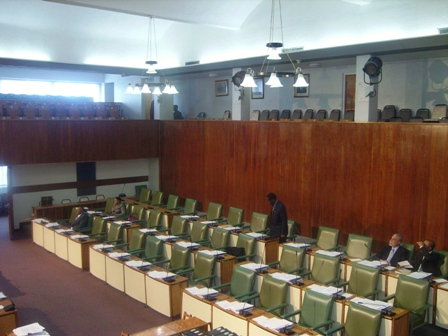
- Interactive map of the Gordon House area

General information
- Type: Parliament building, government building
- Location: 81 Duke Street, Kingston, Jamaica, Jamaica
- Coordinates: 17.9740°N 76.7906°W
- Current tenants: Parliament of Jamaica
- Construction started: 1959
- Completed: 1960; 66 years ago

Gordon House (or George William Gordon House) is the meeting place of the Jamaica Parliament, located at 81 Duke Street in Kingston, close to the old parliament building headquarters.

The house serves as the meeting place of both the Senate and the House of Representatives since independence on August 6, 1962

== History ==
The house was built before the 1960s. It became the official seat of the legislature on October 26, 1960. It was named the George William Gordon House in honour and memory of George William Gordon, who served in the Jamaican Parliament. Gordon was accused of instigating the 1865 Morant Bay Rebellion and was condemned to death. Earlier, the Parliament met at nearby Headquarters (Hibbert) House that was in use since 1872.

=== Replacement ===
A new parliament building to replace Gordon House will be built on the National Heroes Park, directly north of Gordon House.

Construction on the new parliament building was expected to start in early 2021. However, the start of construction has been delayed until at least 2022.

== Parliament chamber ==
The house currently has only one chamber. Visitors are often allowed when Parliament is not in session.

The two-story contemporary building has a symmetrical design at the entrance elevation. It is L-shaped with an open courtyard for parking concealed from the adjoining roads.

== Sources ==
- "Gordon House | Book Gordon House Tour Packages - Travelojamaica". www.travelojamaica.com.
- "KSAMC Will Assist With Construction of Ramp at Gordon House". Jamaica Information Service. 2019-10-14.
- "Jamaican Houses of Parliament | Hines Architecture + Design". Archello.
