= Robert Nesta Morgan =

Jamaican politician (born 1981)

The Honourable Robert Morgan MP

Minister of Economic Growth and Job Creation (Minister without portfolio)
- Incumbent
- Assumed office 11 January 2022
- Constituency: Clarendon North Central

Member of Parliament for Clarendon North Central
- Incumbent
- Assumed office 3 September 2020
- Preceded by: Pearnel Charles

Personal details
- Born: Robert Nesta Morgan; November 13, 1981 (age 44) Wood Hall, Clarendon, Jamaica
- Party: Jamaica Labour Party
- Education: University of the West Indies (BA); University of London (LLB)

Robert Nesta Morgan (born 13 November 1981) is a Jamaican politician, the Minister without Portfolio in the Ministry of Economic Growth and Job Creation with the responsibility for Works. He is a member of the governing Jamaica Labour Party. Morgan represents Clarendon North Central.
