= Dana Morris Dixon =

Jamaican politician

Senator Dr. The Honourable Dana Dixon

Minister of Education, Youth and Information
- Incumbent
- Assumed office October 30, 2024
- Prime Minister: Andrew Holness
- Preceded by: Fayval Williams

Member of the Senate of Jamaica
- Incumbent
- Assumed office September 2025
- In office May 2023 – 30 October 2024

Personal details
- Born: Dana Marie Elizabeth Morris; November 23, 1976 (age 49)
- Party: Jamaica Labour Party
- Education: University of the West Indies (BSc, MSc); Josef Korbel of International Studies (PhD)

Dana Morris Dixon is a Jamaican politician from the Jamaica Labour Party, who currently serves as a Minister of Education, Skills, Youth & Information. Dixon has previously served as a member of the Senate of Jamaica from May 2023 to October 30, 2024.

She was Minister without Portfolio in the Office of the Prime Minister and had direct oversight for Skills and Digital Transformation. In 2024, she was appointed Minister of Education, Youth and Information. Dixon is a 2004 Fulbright Scholar and a graduate of the University of the West Indies.

She is a former broadcast journalist.
