= Christopher Tufton =

Jamaican politician

The Honourable Dr. Christopher Tufton CD MP

Minister of Health and Wellness
- Incumbent
- Assumed office March 2016

MP for Saint Elizabeth South Western
- In office 2007–2011

Minister of Industry Investment and Commerce
- In office July 2011 – December 2011

JLP candidate for Saint Catherine West Central
- In office November 2015 – 2016

Member of Parliament for Saint Catherine West Central
- Incumbent
- Assumed office 2016

Personal details
- Born: Christopher Charles Tufton; January 21, 1971 (age 55)
- Spouse: Neadene Tufton
- Children: 3
- Education: University of the West Indies; Manchester Business School, University of Manchester (DBA)

Christopher Charles Tufton is a Jamaican politician. A member of the governing Jamaica Labour Party, and Jamaica's Minister of Health and Wellness. He previously served as the Minister of Industry, Investment and Commerce from July 2011 to December 2011, having previously served as the Minister of Agriculture and Fisheries since 2007. Tufton served as the Member of Parliament for parliamentary constituency St. Elizabeth South Western from 2007 up until his defeat in 2011. In 2016 Tufton won the St. Catherine West Central seat against the PNP's Clinton Clarke and thus being returned to the Lower House. In March 2016 he was appointed as Minister of Health and Wellness, He currently still serves that post.

He was the president of the Generation 2000 and a lecturer in the Department of Management Studies, UWI, Mona. In 2011 Tufton lost his seat to his PNP counterpart Hugh Buchanan by 13 votes.

He is a former talk show host and columnist. He holds a Doctorate in Business Administration (DBA) from the Manchester Business School.

Tufton is married to Neadene Shields-Tufton with three children.
