= Parliament of Jamaica =

Legislative branch of the Jamaican government

Coordinates: 17.9740°N 76.7906°W

Houses of Parliament Ouses a Paaliment
- 15th Parliament of Jamaica
- Coat of arms of Jamaica

Type
- Type: Bicameral
- Houses: Senate; House of Representatives

Leadership
- Monarch: Charles III since 8 September 2022
- Governor-General: Patrick L. Allen since 26 February 2009
- President of the Senate: Thomas Tavares-Finson, JLP since 10 March 2016
- Speaker of the House of Representatives: Juliet Holness, JLP since 26 September 2023

Structure
- Seats: 84; 21 Senators; 63 Members of Parliament
- Senate political groups: HM Government: JLP (13); Official Opposition: PNP (8)
- House of Representatives political groups: HM Government: JLP (35); Official Opposition: PNP (28)

Elections
- Senate voting system: Appointed by the Governor-General of Jamaica on advice of the Prime Minister and the Leader of the Opposition
- House of Representatives voting system: First-past-the-post
- Last House of Representatives election: 3 September 2025
- Next House of Representatives election: 3 September 2030

Meeting place
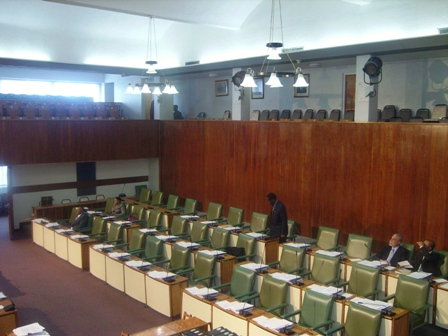
- George William Gordon House, Kingston, Jamaica

Website
- japarliament.gov.jm

The Parliament of Jamaica (Jamaican Patois: Paaliment a Jumieka) is the legislative branch of the government of Jamaica. Officially, they are known as the Houses of Parliament. It consists of three elements: the Crown (represented by the Governor-General), the appointed Senate and the directly elected House of Representatives.

The Senate, the Upper House, is the direct successor of a pre-Independence body known as the "Legislative Council" and comprises 21 senators appointed by the Governor-General: thirteen on the advice of the Prime Minister and eight on the advice of the Leader of the Opposition.

The House of Representatives, the Lower House, is made up of 63 (previously 60) Members of Parliament, elected to five-year terms on a first-past-the-post basis in single-seat constituencies.

== Overview ==
As Jamaica is a parliamentary democracy modelled after the Westminster system, most of the government's ability to make and pass laws is dependent on the Prime Minister's ability to command the confidence of the members of the House of Representatives. Though both Houses of Parliament hold political significance, the House of Representatives, of which the Prime Minister and the Leader of the Opposition are both required to be members, holds a more powerful and prestigious role since it is the main source of legislation.

== Parliament building ==
The Parliament meets at Gordon House at 81 Duke Street, Kingston. It was built in 1960 and named in memory of Jamaican patriot George William Gordon.

Construction on a new parliament building directly north of Gordon House was expected to start in early 2021. However, the start of construction was delayed. As of May 2024, the project was still in the procurement phase.

== House of Representatives ==
The House of Representatives is the Lower House. It is the group of elected members of parliament.

== Senate ==
The Senate is the Upper House. The current members, who were sworn in at the opening of the 15th Parliament in September 2025, are:

Jamaica Labour Party:

- The Hon. Thomas George Lewis Tavares-Finson, OJ, CD, KC, JP, President
- Charles Anthony Sinclair, CD, Deputy President
- The Hon. Aubyn Rochester Hill
- The Hon. Kamina Elizabeth Johnson Smith, Leader of Government Business
- Dr. The Hon. Dana Marie Elizabeth Morris Dixon
- Abka Lincoln Ramon Fitz-Henley
- Kavan Anthony Gayle, CD
- Sherene Samantha Golding Campbell
- Marlon Andre Morgan
- Dr. Elon Beresford Thompson
- The Hon. Keith Patrice Duncan, OJ, CD
- Rose Marie Bennett-Cooper, OD
- Christian George Louis Tavares-Finson

People's National Party:

- Donna Marie Scott-Mottley, Leader of Opposition Business
- Floyd Emerson Morris
- Lambert Alexander Brown, CD
- Allan Rutherford Bernard
- Dr. Maziki Thame
- Cleveland Tomlinson
- Kisha Gaye Anderson
- Ramon Small-Ferguson

Amendments to the Constitution of Jamaica are subject to different requirements depending on the provision being amended. Some provisions may be amended by a majority of all members of both Houses, while entrenched provisions generally require the support of two-thirds of all members of each House. Amendments to specially entrenched provisions additionally require approval in a national referendum.

== Last election ==
Party	Votes	%	Seats	+/–
Jamaica Labour Party	413,814	50.48	35	–14
People's National Party	403,349	49.20	28	+14
Jamaica Progressive Party	2,131	0.26	0	New
United Independents' Congress of Jamaica	184	0.02	0	New
Independents	271	0.03	0	0
Total	819,749	100.00	63	0
Source: Jamaica Observer

== See also ==
- List of presidents of the Jamaican Council
- List of presidents of the Legislative Council of Jamaica
- List of presidents of the Senate of Jamaica
- List of speakers of the House of Representatives of Jamaica
- Women in the House of Representatives of Jamaica
- Jamaican Parliamentary by-elections
- Politics of Jamaica
- List of legislatures by country
- Roy McGann – assassinated member
