= Bible translations into Hebrew =

Translations of the New Testament of the Christian Bible into the Hebrew language

Bible translations into Hebrew primarily refers to translations of the New Testament of the Christian Bible into the Hebrew language, from the original Koine Greek or an intermediate translation. There is less need to translate the Jewish Tanakh (or Christian Old Testament) from the Original Biblical Hebrew, because it is closely intelligible to Modern Hebrew speakers. There are more translations of the small number of Tanakh passages preserved in the more distantly related biblical Aramaic language. There are also Hebrew translations of Biblical apocrypha.

== Hebrew Bible ==
The Hebrew Bible (i.e. the Jewish Tanakh or Christian Old Testament) is almost entirely in Classical (or Biblical) Hebrew. However, there are some significant sections in Biblical Aramaic: about a third of the Book of Daniel and several quoted royal letters and edicts in the Book of Ezra. These are written in the same square-script as the Hebrew parts, and many readers of the Bible in Hebrew are sufficiently familiar with Aramaic as not to require translation for them. Nevertheless, numerous Hebrew translations and paraphrases for these Aramaic parts have been written from the Middle Ages to the present day. The medieval commentary of Gersonides on these books, for instance, contains a Hebrew paraphrase of their Aramaic sections which translates them nearly in their entirety. Many modern editions of the Masoretic Text also contain Hebrew translations of these sections as appendices. Such translations may be found for instance in some versions of the Koren edition, in the Dotan IDF edition, and in the text published by The Bible Society in Israel. Hebrew translation of biblical Aramaic is also standard fare in numerous multivolume Hebrew commentaries meant for popular audiences, such as those of Samuel Leib Gordon, Elia Samuele Artom, Moshe Zvi Segal, Da`at Mikra and Olam ha-Tanakh.

Some modern Israeli editions of the Bible have running footnotes rendering more archaic Biblical Hebrew words and phrases into Modern Hebrew. A Christian translation of the Hebrew Bible into Modern Hebrew was completed in 2006 and called "the Testimony" or העדות. Published in four volumes, all volumes are translated into simple, modern Hebrew vocabulary by Shoshan Danielson and edited by Baruch Maoz. The "Ram Bible" (Tanakh Ram; תנ"ך רם) began to be published in 2008. Of a planned four volume set, currently the first two, Torah and Early Prophets, are available. These editions include the original text in a parallel column.

== Apocrypha ==
The books of the apocrypha were not preserved in the Jewish tradition (as reflected in the Hebrew Masoretic Text). Though the majority of them were originally composed in Hebrew, they have reached us mostly in Greek form, as found in the Septuagint and preserved by the Christian church. A few are extant only in (secondary) translations from the Greek into other languages, such as Latin, Christian Aramaic, or Ge'ez. In modern times there has been renewed Jewish interest in these books, which has resulted in a few translations into Hebrew. In the 19th century most of the apocrypha was translated by Seckel Isaac Fraenkel in Ketuvim Aharonim ("Late Writings" 1830), and a few books were translated by other authors. The Hebrew-language website Daʿat, which collects texts related to Jewish education, has published an online version of these public domain Hebrew translations in digital form; the texts have been formatted and slightly modernized.

Two major annotated Hebrew translations of the apocrypha were published in the 20th century. Both editions include commentaries by the editors, both are vowelized, and both of them incorporate parts of the original Hebrew for Ben Sira that were found in the Cairo Geniza and the Dead Sea Scrolls.

- Avraham Kahana, ed. and trans., Ha-Sefarim ha-Hitsonim. Tel-Aviv: Hotsaat Meqorot, 1937 (2 vols.), most recently reissued in 2006.
- Eliyah Shemuel Hartom (aka. Elia Samuele Artom), ed. and trans., Ha-Sefarim ha-Hitsonim. Tel-Aviv: Yavneh, 1965–69.

Another annotated Hebrew edition of Ben Sira was published by Moshe Zvi Segal in 1953 and subsequently revised; it also takes into account Hebrew copies found in the Cairo Geniza, among the Dead Sea Scrolls, and at Masada. It is current available from the Bialik Institute.

In the early 21st century, the Yad Ben-Zvi Institute in Jerusalem inaugurated a major project of a scholarly publication called Bein Miqra la-Mishnah ("Between the Bible and the Mishnah"), whose scope includes new Hebrew translations and in-depth commentaries on apocryphal books. So far Maccabees 1 & 2 and Jubilees, along with many non-Apocrypha volumes, have appeared; Maccabees 3 & 4 are in preparation.

== New Testament ==
=== Polemical rabbinical translations ===
Quotes of the New Testament in Hebrew occur in polemical or apologetic Hebrew texts from the 6th century CE. Three medieval polemical rabbinical translations of Matthew predate the Hutter Bible [Which?]. A fourth rabbinical translation, that of Ezekiel Rahabi, Friedrich Albert Christian and Leopold Immanuel Jacob van Dort, 1741–1756, may have been the same text as the "Travancore Hebrew New Testament of Rabbi Ezekiel" bought by Claudius Buchanan in Cochin, and later given to Joseph Frey. An ecumenical approach is seen in Elias Soloweyczyk's Matthew, 1869.

=== The Hutter Dodecaglott Bible ===
The New Testament was first translated into Hebrew by Elias Hutter in his Polyglott edition of the New Testament in twelve languages: Greek, Syriac, Hebrew, Latin, German, Bohemian, Italian, Spanish, French, English, Danish and Polish, at Nuremberg, in 1599, 1600, in two volumes.

Some individual books were translated before Hutter's complete New Testament, such as Alfonso de Zamora's Letter to the Hebrews (1526). Carmignac (1978) identifies at least 23 translators of the Gospel of Matthew into Hebrew.

=== Christian translations ===
As part of the Christian mission to Jews the Greek New Testament has been translated into Hebrew several times since the 19th century. These versions sometimes exist in bilingual editions.

These Christian versions generally use the Hebrew word משיחיים Meshiẖiyyim ("Messianics") for Greek Χριστιανοί, Khristianoi ("Christians") in the text in preference to the Talmudic term נוצרים, Notsrim ("Nazarenes").

The majority of these versions use the Tetragrammaton (YHWH) when citing quotations from the Hebrew Bible, although this does not mean that Hebrew-speaking Christians necessarily pronounce aloud the name as "Yahweh", any more than Hebrew-speaking Jews, and may read as "Adonai" or "HaShem".

==== Gospels of Matthew ====
- 1537, Gospel of Matthew, Sebastian Münster, Basel – based on one of the Rabbinical translations of Matthew.
- 1551, 1550 Gospel of Matthew, J. Quinquarboreus (Jean Cinqarbres) and 1550 Jean Mercier (Hebraist), Paris – confused with Sebastian Münster's adaption of a Rabbinical text of Matthew, but prepared from another of the Rabbinical translations of Matthew, purchased in Italy by bishop Jean du Tillet.
- 1553, Psalms and first 2 chapters of Matthew, Anton Margaritha, Leipzig – a Jewish convert.
- 1869, Gospel of Matthew, Elias Soloweyczyk
- 1875, Gospel of Matthew, William Henry Guillemard, Cambridge
- 1948–1950, Gospels of Matthew and Mark, J.-M. Paul Bauchet, Jerusalem. These are slightly revised versions of Delitzsch.

==== Gospels of Mark ====
- 1575, Gospel of Mark, Walther Herbst, Wittemberg
- 1813–1817, New Testament, Thomas Fry and William Bengo' Collyer, London
- 1969, The Gospel of Mark, Robert Lisle Lindsey

==== Gospels of Luke ====
- 1574, Gospel of Luke, Fredericus Petrus, Lutheran pastor of the church of Brunswick.
- 1735, Gospel of Luke, Heinrich Frommann, Halle

==== Gospels of John ====
- 1957, Gospel of John, Moshe I. Ben Maeir, Denver

==== Hebrew Gospels ====
- 1576, The Anniversary Gospels in four languages, Johannes Claius (Johann Klaj), Leipzig
- 1668, Latin-Hebrew Gospels, Jona, Giovanni Battista (1588–1668),(originally Jehuda Jona ben-Isaac), Rome
- 1805, The four gospels, Thomas Yeates, London. Apparently a revision of Jona, Giovanni Battista 1668 (see above)
- 1831, New Testament, Novum Testamentum, Hebraice ed. William Greenfield (philologist), London

==== New Testament ====
- 1560s? unpublished manuscript of the New Testament. Erasmus Oswald Schreckenfuchs (1511–1579) Professor of Mathematics, Rhetorics, and Hebrew, first at Tübingen, afterwards at Freiburg in Breisgau.
- 1569, Tremellius publishes an edition of the Syriac Peshitta in Hebrew letters.
- 1599, New Testament in 12 languages, Elias Hutter, Nuremberg
- 1661, New Testament, William Robertson, London. Revised version of Hutter 1599
- 1796, New Testament, Dominik von Brentano, Vienna and Prague
- 1798–1805, NT, Richard Caddick, London. Revised version of Hutter 1599 and Robertson 1661
- 1817, New Testament: Berit hadasha 'al pi Mashiah: ne'etak mi-leshon Yavan lileshon 'Ivri. London: A. Mactintosh, 1817. Early edition of the London Jews' Society's New Testament in Hebrew. T. Fry, G.B. Collier and others
- 1838, New Testament, Alexander M'Caul (1799–1863), Johann Christian Reichardt (1803–1873), Stanislaus Hoga and Michael Solomon Alexander for the London Society for Promoting Christianity Amongst the Jews.
- 1846, New Testament, Johann Christian Reichardt (1803–1873), London
- 1863, New Testament, Hermann Heinfetter, London
- 1865, New Testament, Ezekiel Margoliouth, London Jews' Society, London. This is the only complete cantillated translation of the New Testament.
- 1866, New Testament, J. C. Reichardt and J. H. R. Biesenthal, London
- 1877–1889, New Testament, Franz Delitzsch (1813–1890), Leipzig. The first edition was published in 1877, the 10th edition – which was the last one revised by Delitzsch himself – in 1889. The first edition was based on the Codex Sinaiticus. However, at the behest of the British and Foreign Bible Society, subsequent editions followed the Textus Receptus, a more traditional and less critical edition. The translation was revised by Arnold Ehrlich (1848–1919).
- 1885, New Testament, Isaac Salkinsohn (c. 1820 – 1883)
- 1886, New Testament, I. Salkinson and C. D. Ginsburg, London. This edition is a profound revision of Salkinsohn 1885 by Christian David Ginsburg (1831–1914). It was first distributed by the Trinitarian Bible Society, now distributed by The Society for Distributing Hebrew Scriptures. Background information on the translation is available, and there is a revised and modernized by Eri S. Gabe (2000). The translation is issued in bilingual editions (such as Hebrew-English on facing pages) with the explicit aim of making it appealing to Jews.
- 1892, New Testament, Delitzsch and Gustaf Dalman. This is the 11th edition of Delitzsch, extensively revised by Dalman, based on older manuscripts. Most later printed editions of Delitzsch are based on this one.
- 1975, New Testament, J.-M. Paul Bauchet and D. Kinneret Arteaga, Rome. In modern Hebrew, without vowel points.
- 1977, New Testament, United Bible Societies, Jerusalem. This is a modern Hebrew translation prepared by an ecumenical team of scholars in the beginning of the seventies. The translation was first published by The Bible Society in Israel in 1977. It has been revised several times, latest in 2010. Part of this translation – primarily the four gospels and to a lesser grade the Book of Revelation – is apparently based on Delitzsch (see above), while the Acts of the Apostles and the Epistles seem to be independent translations.
- 1977, New Testament, Living Bible International, translator unknown. This is more a paraphrase than a literal translation in modern Hebrew, in line with other translations of The Living Bible. The four gospels and the Acts of the Apostles were published in Israel in 1977 under the title Beit ha-lahmi.
- 1979, Habrit Hakhadasha/Haderekh "The Way" (Hebrew Living New Testament) 2009 by Biblica, Inc.
- 2013, New Testament, New World Translation of the Christian Greek Scriptures, published by the Watch Tower Bible and Tract Society of Pennsylvania.

==== Acts ====
- 1851–1867, Luke, Acts, Romans and Hebrews, Johann Heinrich Raphael Biesenthal (1800–1886), Berlin

==== Epistles ====
- 1557, Epistle to the Hebrews, Sebastian Münster, Basel
- 1586, The Anniversary Epistles in four languages, ed. Conrad Neander,
- 1598, Epistles to the Galatians and the Ephesians, György Thúri (Georgius Thurius), Wittenberg
- 1734, Epistle to the Hebrews, Friedrich Albert Christian, Halle
- 1766, Epistle to the Hebrews, György Kalmár, Amsterdam

=== Comparison ===
Translation	John (Yohanan) 3:16
Giovanni Battista Jona (1668)	כִּי כָּל־כַּךְ אָהַב אֱלֹהִים לָעוֹלָם שֶׁנָּתַן בְּנוֹ יְחִידוֹ כְּדֵי שֶׁכָּל־הַמַּאֲמִין בּוֹ לֹא יֹאבַד כִּי־אִם יִהְי לוֹ חַיִים לַנֶצַח׃
Richard Caddick (1799)	כִּי־כֵן אָהַב אֱלֹהִים אֶת־הָעוֹלָם אֲשֶׁר אֶת־בְּנוֹ יְחִידוֹ נָתַן לְמַעַן־כָּל־הַמַּאֲמִין בּוֹ לֹא יֹאבֵד כִּי אִם יִהְיוּ לוֹ חַיֵּי עוֹלָם׃
Thomas Yeates (1805)	כי־יען אלֹהים אהב לעוֹלם שׁלח בנוֹ יחידוֹ אשׁר כל־המּאמין בוֹ לֹא יאבד כּי־אם יהי לוֹ חיים לנצח׃
Fry and Collyer (1817)	וְכֹה אָהַב אֱלֹהִים אֶת־הָאָרֶץ כִּי־נָתַן אֶת־בֶּן־יְחִידוֹ וְכָל־הַמַּאֲמִין בּוֹ לֹא יֹאבֵד כִּי אִם־חַיֵּי עוֹלָמִים יִהְיוּ לוֹ׃
William Greenfield (1831)	כִּי כֹה אָהַב אֱלֹהִים אֶת־הָעוֹלָם כִּי־נָתַן אֶת־בְּנוֹ הַיָּחִיד לְמַעַן כָּל־הַמַּאֲמִין בּוֹ לֹא יֹאבַד כִּי אִם־חַיֵּי עוֹלָם יִהְיוּ לוֹ׃
Ezekiel Margoliouth (1865)	כִּי כָּכָה אָהַב הָאֱלֹהִים אֶת־הָעוֹלָם עַד אֲשֶׁר נָתַן אֶת־בְּנוֹ יְחִידוֹ לְמַעַן כָּל־הַמַּאֲמִין בּוֹ לֹא יֹאבַד כִּי אִם־יִהְיוּ לוֹ חַיֵּי עוֹלָמִים׃
Delitzsch, 10th edition (1889)	כִּי־כָכָה אָהַב הָאֱלֹהִים אֶת־הָעוֹלָם עַד־אֲשֶׁר נָתַן אֶת־בְּנוֹ אֶת־יְחִידוֹ לְמַעַן לֹא־יֹאבַד כָּל־הַמַּאֲמִין בּוֹ כִּי אִם־יִחְיֶה חַיֵּי עוֹלָמִים׃
Salkinsohn and Ginsburg (1891)	כִּי־כֵן אֹהֵב אֱלֹהִים אֶת־הָעוֹלָם עַד־אֲשֶׁר נָתַן בַּעֲדוֹ אֶת־בְּנוֹ אֶת־יְחִידוֹ וְכָל־הַמַּאֲמִין בּוֹ לֹא־יֹאבַד כִּי בוֹ יִמְצָה חַיֵּי עוֹלָם׃
Dalman and Delitzsch (1892)	כִּי־אַהֲבָה רַבָּה אָהַב הָאֱלֹהִים אֶת־הָעוֹלָם עַד־אֲשֶׁר נָתַן אֶת־בְּנוֹ אֶת־יְחִידוֹ לְמַעַן אֲשֶׁר לֹא־יֹאבַד כָּל־הַמַּאֲמִין בּוֹ כִּי אִם־יִחְיֶה חַיֵּי עוֹלָם׃
The Bible Society in Israel (1977)	כִּי כֹּה אָהַב אֱלֹהִים אֶת הָעוֹלָם עַד כִּי נָתַן אֶת בְּנוֹ יְחִידוֹ לְמַעַן לֹא יֹאבַד כָּל הַמַּאֲמִין בּוֹ, אֶלָּא יִנְחַל חַיֵּי עוֹלָם׃
The Living Bible (1977)	כי אלוהים אהב כל כך את העולם עד שהקריב את בנו היחיד, כדי שכל המאמין בו לא יאבד כי אם יחיה לנצח׃
