= List of mayors of Kingston, Jamaica =

On 15 March 1801, royal assent was given for establishing the city and parish of Kingston, Jamaica as a corporation, with a mayor, aldermen, and council (Geo. III c. 29 p. 144). The first election took place November 15, 1802. Below is a list of mayors of Kingston since 1802:

- John Jaques (1802–1809)
- George Kinghorne (1809–1823)
- Joseph Barnes (1823–1829)
- Thomas Yates (1829–1833)
- Hector Mitchell (1833–1853)
- Philip Lawrence (1853–1854)
- Edward Jordon (1854–1868)
- Lewis Bowerbank (1868–1870)
- John S. Brown (1871–1872), Custos
- Henry J. Kemble (1873–1885), Custos
- James Scott (1885–1886)
- Wellesley Bourke (1886–1888)
- Richard Jackson (1888–1889)
- James Ogilvie (1889–1895)
- Samuel Hammond Watson (1895–1896)
- Philip Stern (1896–1898)
- Adrian Robinson (1899–1902)
- George Eustace Burke (1903–1903)
- Charles Walter Tait (1904–1907)
- George Paton Myers (1910-1911)
- Robert William Bryant (1911–1912)
- Hubert A. L. Simpson, OBE (1913–1916)
- Robert William Bryant (1917–1923)
- Hubert A. L. Simpson, OBE (1923–1924), Commissioner
- Altamont daCosta (1925–1927)
- Sir George Seymour (1931–1934)
- Oswald Anderson (1937–1938)
- William Seivright (1944–1946)
- Geoffrey Gunter (1946–1947)
- Alexander Bustamante (1947–1948)
- Lynden Newland (1948–1951)
- Ken Hill (1951– )
- [Cleveland George Walker (1953-1954
- George McFarlane (1951–1958)
- Iris King (1958–1960)
- Eric Bell (1969–1970)
- Emerson Barrett (1970–1971)
- Eli Matalon (1971–1973)
- Ralph Brown (1974–1977)
- George Mason (1977–1978)
- Arthur Jones (1978–1981)
- Ryan Peralto (1981–1982)
- Colleen Yap (1982–1984)
- Edward Miller (1984–1985), Administrator
- Ralph Brown (1986–1989)
- Marie Atkins (1989–2003)
- Desmond McKenzie (2003–2012)
- Angela Brown-Burke (2012–2016)
- Delroy Williams (2016–2024)
- Andrew Swaby (2024–Present 2026 )
