= Caddick =

Caddick is a surname. Notable people with the surname include:

- Andy Caddick (born 1968), English cricketer
- Bill Caddick (1944–2018), English musician
- Bill Caddick (footballer) (1898–1981), English footballer
- Edward Caddick (1931–2017), English actor
- Helen Caddick (1845–1927), English travel writer
- Melissa Caddick (1971–2020), Australian fraudster
- Paul Caddick (born 1950), British businessman
- Richard Caddick (1740–1819), English Hebraist
- William Caddick (1719–1794), English painter

== See also ==
- Peter Caddick-Adams (born 1960), British military historian
