= Timeline of Kingston, Jamaica =

Coordinates: 17.983333°N 76.8°W

The following is a timeline of the history of the city of Kingston, Jamaica.

== Prior to 19th century ==
- 1692 – 7 June: The Jamaica earthquake destroys Port Royal due to heavy liquefaction and a tsunami; around 5,000 are killed there. Residents resettle nearby thus establishing Kingston.
- 1690s – Parish Church built (approximate date).
- 1703 - Port Royal laid waste by fire.
- 1712 – Hurricane.
- 1720 – Pirate John Rackham hanged.
- 1722
  - Hurricane.
  - Weekly Jamaica Courant newspaper in publication.
- 1729 – Wolmers's School founded.
- 1740 – "Twelve Apostles" battery constructed.
- 1746 – Theatre opens in Harbour Street.
- 1750 – Sephardic synagogue built.
- 1755
  - House of Assembly (legislature of British Jamaica) relocated to Kingston from Spanish Town.
  - Population: 10,000 (approximate).
- 1771 – 3 September: An earthquake causes moderate damage in Port Royal and Kingston.
- 1775 – American Company of Comedians in performance.
- 1780 - Fire.
- 1783 – Kingston Race Course laid out.
- 1788 – Population: 26,478 (of which 16,659 were slaves).
- 1794 – Kingston Medical Society founded.

== 19th century ==
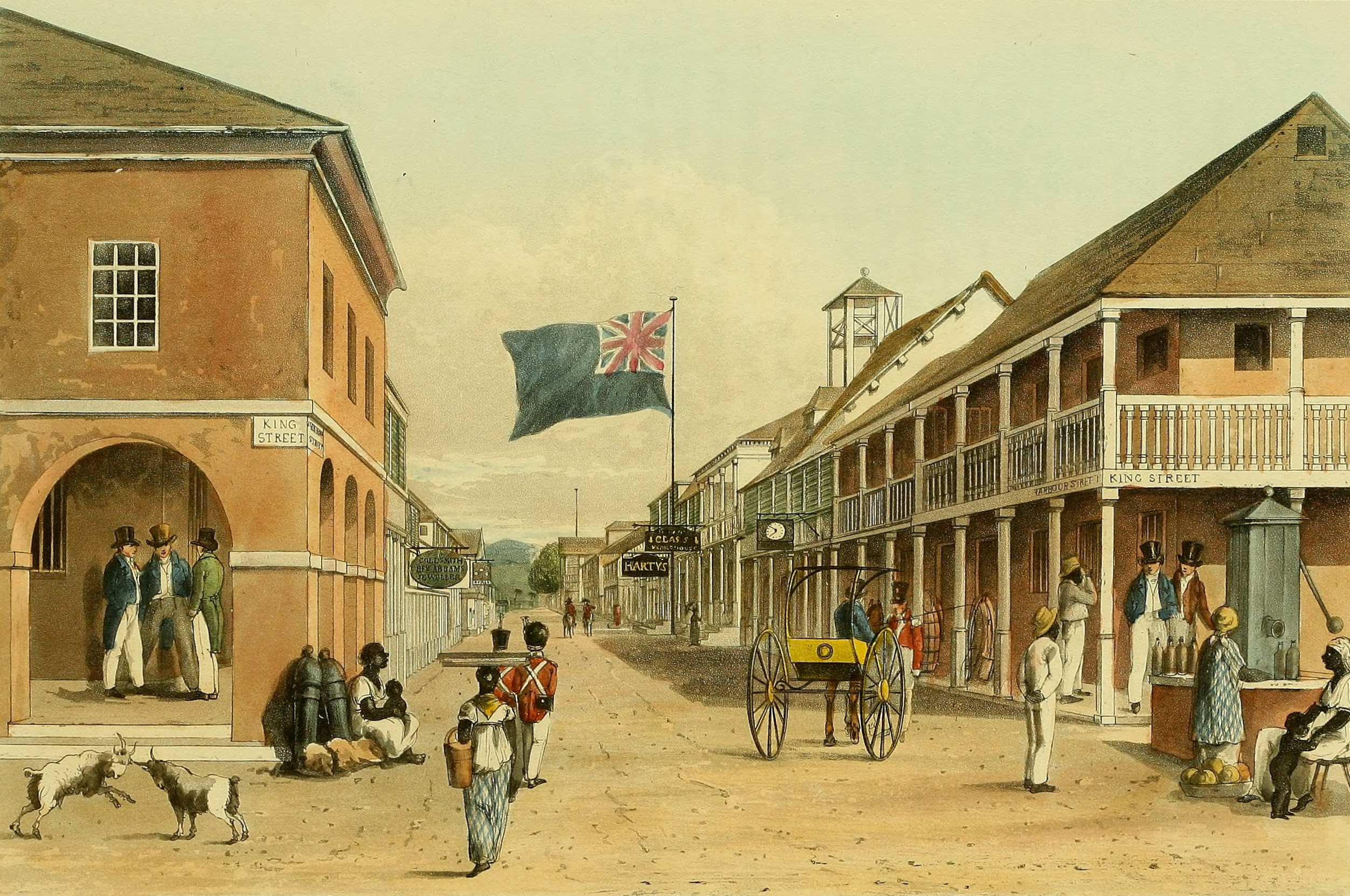
Harbour Street, Kingston, c. 1820

- 1802 – Kingston incorporated.
- 1807 – Slave trade officially abolished per Slave Trade Act.
- 1823 – Population: 33,000 (approximate).
- 1824 – Jamaica Journal and Kingston Chronicle newspaper begins publication.
- 1825 – Jamaica Horticultural Society founded.
- 1834
  - Slavery officially abolished per Slavery Abolition Act.
  - Jamaica Gleaner newspaper begins publication.
  - Mico College founded.
- 1843
  - 26 August: Fire.
  - Agricultural Society founded.
- 1845 – Spanish Town-Kingston railway (Jamaica Railway Company) begins operating and Kingston railway station opens.
- 1862 - Fire.
- 1870 – Legislative Council of British Jamaica moves to Headquarters House.
- 1872
  - Capital of British Jamaica relocated to Kingston from Spanish Town.
  - Victoria Market built on site of "Sunday/Negro market."
  - Jamaica Club founded.
- 1879 – Institute of Jamaica and Sugar Wharf established.
- 1881
  - Population: 36,846.
  - Devon House (residence) built.
- 1882 – 11 December: Fire.
- 1885 – Shaare Shalom Synagogue built.
- 1887 – Jubilee Market dedicated.
- 1890 – Chinese Benevolent Society founded.
- 1891
  - Constant Spring Hotel in business (approximate date).
  - Population: 46,542.
  - Jamaica International Exhibition held.
- 1892 - Electricity came to Jamaica.
- 1894 – Montego Bay-Kingston railway begins operating.
- 1897 – Victoria Park opens (approximate date).
- 1898 – Adrian Robinson becomes mayor.
- 1899 – Electric tram begins operating.

== 20th century ==
=== 1900s–1950s ===
- 1907 – 14 January: The 6.5 M_{w} Kingston earthquake causes 800–1,000 deaths and flooding from a moderate tsunami.
- 1908 – King's House, Jamaica built.
- 1910 – Alpha Boys Band active.
- 1912
  - Ward Theatre established.
  - Hubert A. L. Simpson becomes mayor.
- 1914 – Population: 57,379.
- 1918 – Myrtle Bank Hotel rebuilt.
- 1923 – Kingston and St. Andrew Corporation (city government) formed.
- 1927
  - December: Marcus Garvey returns to Kingston.
  - Heritage Dam built.
- 1929
  - Blackman newspaper begins publication.
  - August: Universal Negro Improvement Association Convention held.
- 1930 – Sabina Park (cricket ground) established.
- 1935 – King of Kings Ethiopian Mission founded (approximate date).
- 1938 – Carib Theatre opens.
- 1947 – Alexander Bustamante elected mayor.
- 1948
  - Kingston Air Traffic Control Centre and Palisadoes Airport established.
  - University College of the West Indies established near city.
- 1951 – August: Hurricane Charlie.
- 1956 – Catholic Diocese of Kingston formed.
- 1957 – Earthquake.
- 1958 – Iris King becomes mayor.

=== 1960s–1990s ===
- 1960
  - Parliament of Jamaica moves to Gordon House.
  - Population: 123,403 city; 376,520 urban agglomeration.
- 1962
  - 6 August: City becomes part of independent Jamaica.
  - Independence Park (sports complex) opens.
  - 15–28 August: 1962 Central American and Caribbean Games held.
  - Tivoli Gardens housing complex in Back O'Wall built.
- 1963
  - Studio One (record label) in business.
  - McIntyre Land Citizens' Association formed.
- 1964 – 11 November: Burial of Marcus Garvey in King George VI Memorial Park.
- 1965 – Ethnic unrest.
- 1966
  - 21 April: Haile Selassie visits Jamaica.
  - August: 1966 British Empire and Commonwealth Games held.
- 1968 – Jamaica Stock Exchange founded.
- 1970
  - Tuff Gong record label founded.
  - Population: 111,879 city; 475,548 urban agglomeration.
- 1972 – Ralph Eugene Brown PNP general-secretary becomes mayor.
- 1973 – Jamaica Pegasus Hotel built.
- 1979 – National Library of Jamaica headquartered in city.
- 1982 – Population: 104,041 city; 524,638 urban agglomeration.
- 1987 – Bob Marley Museum opens.
- 1989 – Marie Atkins becomes mayor.
- 1990 – African Caribbean Institute of Jamaica / Jamaica Memory Bank headquartered in Kingston.
- 1991 – Population: 103,962 city.
- 1993 – The Jamaica Observer newspaper begins publication.

== 21st century ==
- 2001 – Population: 579,137.
- 2002 – Emancipation Park opens in Kingston.
- 2003
  - Passa Passa begins.
  - Desmond McKenzie becomes mayor.
- 2008 – Monument "In Memory of Children Killed" unveiled.
- 2010 – May–June: 2010 Kingston unrest.
- 2011 – Population: 937,700.
- 2012 – Angela Brown-Burke becomes mayor.

== See also ==
- Kingston history
- List of National Heritage Sites in Kingston
- Trenchtown history

== Bibliography ==
Published in the 18th–19th centuries

- Edward Long (1774), "Parish and Town of Kingston", History of Jamaica, London: T. Lowndes
- G. Arnaboldi (1852). Tourist's Guide to the Chief Towns And Villages of the Island of Jamaica. Kingston. hdl:2027/hvd.32044072260029.
- James Henry Stark (1898), "Kingston", Stark's Jamaica Guide, Boston: J.H. Stark
- Lillian D. Kelsey (January 1898). "Winter Days in Jamaica: In and About Kingston". The International: An Illustrated Monthly Magazine. 4. Chicago: Brower.

Published in the 20th century

- "Kingston, Jamaica", Tourist Guide to the West Indies, Venezuela, Isthmus of Panama and Bermuda, New York: Hamburg-American Line, 1909, OCLC 58672123
- "Kingston (Jamaica)" . Encyclopædia Britannica. Vol. 15 (11th ed.). 1910. p. 821.
- Algernon E. Aspinall (1914), "Kingston", Pocket Guide to the West Indies, British Guiana, British Honduras, the Bermudas, the Spanish Main, and the Panama Canal, Chicago: Rand, McNally & Company
- Frederick A. Ober (1920), "Kingston", Guide to the West Indies, Bermuda and Panama, New York: Dodd, Mead & Company, OCLC 1515460
- M. G. Smith; Roy Augier; Rex Nettleford (1967). "The Rastafari Movement In Kingston, Jamaica". Caribbean Quarterly. 13.
- Tom Graham (1972). Kingston 100 years. Kingston, Jamaica: T. Graham.
- Colin G. Clarke (1975), "Ecological Aspects of Population Growth in Kingston, Jamaica", Publication Series (Conference of Latin Americanist Geographers), 4, Conference of Latin Americanist Geographers: 42–55, JSTOR 25765506
- Colin G. Clarke (1975), Kingston, Jamaica: Urban Development and Social Change, 1692–1962, Berkeley: University of California Press, ISBN 0-520-02025-1
- Jack Alexander (1977). "The Culture of Race in Middle-Class Kingston, Jamaica". American Ethnologist. 4 (3): 413–435. doi:10.1525/ae.1977.4.3.02a00020.
- Pauline Knight and Omar Davies (1978). "Analysis of residential location patterns in the Kingston Metropolitan Area". Social and Economic Studies. 27.
- Wilma Bailey (1978). "Social control in the pre-Emancipation society of Kingston, Jamaica". Boletín de Estudios Latinoamericanos y del Caribe (24).
- L. Alan Eyre (1984). "Political Violence and Urban Geography in Kingston, Jamaica". Geographical Review. 74 (1): 24. Bibcode:1984GeoRv..74...24E. doi:10.2307/214758. JSTOR 214758.
- Robert Witmer (1987). "'Local and 'Foreign': The Popular Music Culture of Kingston, Jamaica, before Ska, Rock Steady, and Reggae". Latin American Music Review. 8.
- Swithin Wilmot (1990). "Politics of protest in free Jamaica: The Kingston John Canoe Christmas Riots, 1840 and 1841". Caribbean Quarterly. 36.

Published in the 21st century

- Amanda Sives (2002). "Changing Patrons, from Politician to Drug Don: Clientelism in Downtown Kingston, Jamaica". Latin American Perspectives. 29.
- David Marley (2005), "Kingston", Historic Cities of the Americas, Santa Barbara, Calif: ABC-CLIO, ISBN 1-57607-027-1
- Michelle Stewart (2005). "Creole Language in Kingston: The Emergence of Basilectal Varieties – 1692–1865". Caribbean Quarterly. 51.
- Colin Clarke and David Howard (2006). "Contradictory Socio-Economic Consequences of Structural Adjustment in Kingston, Jamaica". The Geographical Journal. 172.
- Colin G. Clarke (2006). Decolonizing the Colonial City: Urbanization and Stratification in Kingston, Jamaica. Oxford University Press. ISBN 978-0-19-151503-3.
- Patricia Anderson (2007). "Challenge of housing and community conflict in East and West Kingston". Social and Economic Studies. 56.
- Winnifred R. Brown-Glaude (2011), Higglers in Kingston: women's informal work in Jamaica, Nashville: Vanderbilt University Press, ISBN 978-0-8265-1765-4
- Trevor Burnard; Emma Hart (2012). "Kingston, Jamaica, and Charleston, South Carolina: A New Look at Comparative Urbanization in Plantation Colonial British America". Journal of Urban History. 39.
- Trevor Burnard (2013). "Kingston, Jamaica: Crucible of Modernity". In Jorge Canizares-Esguerra; et al. (eds.). Black Urban Atlantic in the Age of the Slave Trade. University of Pennsylvania Press. ISBN 978-0-8122-0813-9.
