= Bauchet =

Bauchet is a French surname. Notable people with the name include:

- Arthur Bauchet (b. 2000), para-alpine skier
- Henry Bauchet (1879–1970), ingénier and inventor
- Jean-Marie Paul Bauchet (b. 1900), Hebraist
- Romain Bauchet (b. 1994), professional footballer (soccer)
