= Thomas Yates =

Thomas Yates may refer to:

- Thomas J. Yates (1870–1958), seminary teacher in The Church of Jesus Christ of Latter-day Saints
- Tom Yates (1896–1978), British trade unionist
- Thomas L. Yates (fl. 1820), politician in Jamaica

== See also ==
- Thomas Yate (c.1604–1681), Principal of Brasenose College, Oxford
- Thomas Yeates (born 1955), American comic book and comic strip artist
- Thomas Yeates (orientalist) (1768–1839), oriental linguist
