= Soloveitchik =

Soloveitchik (Hebrew: סולובייצ'יק Yiddish: סאָלאָווייטשיק) (also Soloveichik) is a surname. The name is an East Slavic patronymic derivation from the nickname Solovey, Russian: соловей, "nightingale", using the diminutive suffix -chik. It is notably the name of a rabbinic family descended from Yosef Dov Soloveitchik (Beis Halevi) (1820-1892). Members include:

- Ahron Soloveichik (1917–2001)
- Avraham Yehoshua Soloveitchik
- Bar Soloveychik (born 2000), Israeli swimmer
- Berel Soloveitchik (1915–1981)
- Chaim Soloveitchik (1853–1918)
- Eliyahu Soloveitchik (Elijah Zevi) (1805–1881)
- Haym Soloveitchik (born 1937), American rabbi
- Joseph B. Soloveitchik (1903–1993), American Orthodox rabbi, Talmudist, and modern Jewish philosopher.
- Max Soloveichik (1883-1957), Lithuanian-Jewish Zionist activist, journalist, and a politician
- Meir Soloveichik (born 1977), American
- Moshe Soloveichik (1879–1941)
- Moshe Soloveitchik (Zürich) (1914-1995)
- Meshulam Dovid Soloveitchik (1921-2021)
- Peter Salovey (born 1958) (unlike the other names listed here, Salovey is not a descendant of Yosef Dov Soloveitchik, but rather of his uncle Eliyahu Zevi)
- Samuel Soloveichik (1909–1967)
- Yitzchok Zev Soloveitchik (1886–1959)
- Yosef Dov Soloveitchik (Beis Halevi)
- Moshe Meiselman (born 1942)

== Family tree ==
Brisker family tree

Rabbanit Esti Rosenberg, director of Migdal Oz (seminary)
Rabbi Yitzchok Lichtenstein, Co-Rosh Yeshiva of Yeshiva Torah Vodaas; Rabbi Bais Avrohom, Monsey, NY
Rabbi Yosef Dov (Reb Berel) Soloveichik	Rabbi Avrohom Yehoshua Soloveichik	Rabbi Mosheh Lichtenstein, Co-Rosh Yeshiva of Yeshivat Har Etzion
Rabbi Meshulam Dovid (Reb Dovid) Soloveichik	Rabbi Yitzchak Zev Soloveichik	Rabbi Mayer Lichtenstein, Rabbi Ohel Menachem Bet Shemesh
Rabbi Yosef Dov (HaLevi) Soloveichik author of Beis HaLevi	Rabbi Chaim Soloveichik "Reb Chaim Brisker"	Rabbi Yitzchak Zev (Reb Velvel) Soloveichik "The GRIZ"; The Brisker Rov	Lifsha Soloveitchik Feinstein	Dr. Tovah Soloveitchik Lichtenstein	Rabbi Jonathan Rosenblatt
Rabbi Refael Shapiro, Rosh Yeshiva of Volozhin yeshiva	Lifsha Shapiro	Rabbi Refoel Soloveichik	Rabbi Dr. Aharon Lichtenstein	Tzipporah Rosenblatt
Rabbi Meir Soloveichik	Dr. Atarah Soloveitchik Twersky	Rabbi Mosheh Twersky z"l, Maggid Shiur at Yeshiva Toras Moshe
Rabbi Dr. Joseph B. (Yosef Dov) Soloveitchik "The Rav"	Rabbi Dr. Isadore Twersky, Talner Rebbe of Boston	Rabbi Mayer Twersky, Rosh Yeshiva at Rabbi Isaac Elchanan Theological Seminary
Rabbi Moshe Soloveichik	Rabbi Ahron Soloveichik	Rabbi Dr. Haym Soloveitchik	Rabbi Moshe Soloveichik, Rosh Yeshivas Brisk (Chicago); Rav of Kehilas Beth Sholom Ahavas Achim
Peshka Feinstein Soloveichik	Dr. Samuel Soloveichik	Rabbi Eliyahu Soloveichik, Rosh Yeshiva at Lander College's Beis Medrash L'Talmud	Rabbi Meir Yaakov Soloveichik
Shulamit Soloveitchik Meiselman	Rabbi Moshe Meiselman, Rosh Yeshiva of Yeshiva Toras Moshe	Rabbi Yosef Soloveichik	Sarah Orenshein
Anne Soloveitchik Gerber	Rabbi Chayim Soloveichik, Maggid Shiur at Yeshivat Reishit; Morah D’Asrah of Kehillat Ohr Shalom, Ramat Beit Shemesh	Moshe Soloveichik
Rabbi Yosef Dov Soloveichik	Rabbi Shmuel Chaim Soloveichik
Rabbi Yitzchok Soloveichik	Rabbi Yisroel Soloveichik
Rabbi Yisroel Gershon Soloveichik	Rabbi Moshe Soloveichik	Rabbi Boruch Soloveichik
Rabbi Avraham Yeshaya Soloveichik
Daughter Soloveichik

Notes:
- Rabbi Chaim Halevi Soloveichik (the second)

== See also ==
- Brisk tradition and Soloveitchik dynasty
- Vorobeichik
