= Eli Matalon =

Jamaican businessman and politician

The Honourable Eli Joseph Matalon OJ

Minister of National Security and Justice
- In office 1974–1976
- Monarch: Elizabeth II
- Governor General: Sir Florizel Glasspole
- Prime Minister: Michael Manley
- Preceded by: (new ministry)
- Succeeded by: Keble Munn (National Security); Carl Rattray (Justice)

Minister of Education
- In office 1973–1974
- Monarch: Elizabeth II
- Governor General: Sir Herbert Duffus
- Prime Minister: Michael Manley
- Preceded by: Sir Florizel Glasspole
- Succeeded by: Sir Howard Cooke

Mayor of Kingston
- In office 1971–1973

Personal details
- Born: Eleyahu Joseph Matalon; January 9, 1924 Kingston, Colony of Jamaica, British Empire
- Died: October 31, 1999 (aged 75) Miami, Florida
- Party: People's National Party
- Spouse: Hilary (née Surridge) (m. 1950)
- Children: 3 sons, 2 daughters
- Awards: Order of Jamaica (1975)

Military service
- Allegiance: Canada
- Branch/service: Royal Canadian Air Force
- Rank: Flying Officer
- Unit: No. 6 Group RCAF
- Battles/wars: World War II

Eli Joseph Matalon OJ (9 January 1924 – 31 October 1999) was a Jamaican businessman and politician representing the People's National Party (PNP). He served as Mayor of Kingston from 1971 to 1973, as Minister of Education from 1973 to 1974, and as the first Minister of National Security and Justice from 1974 to 1976.

== Early life and education ==
Matalon was born Eleyahu Joseph Matalon on January 9, 1924, in Kingston, Jamaica to a family of Syrian-Jewish origin. He was seventh of eleven children born to Joseph Isaac Matalon, merchant, and Florizel Madge Matalon (née Henriques). Matalon was educated at Kingston College.

== Military service ==
During World War II, Matalon served as a flying officer in the Royal Canadian Air Force. He was a bomber pilot in the 6th Group Bomber Command.

== Business career ==
Upon his return to Jamaica after military service, Matalon set up a cocoa-processing factory in the 1950s and ran Tropicair Jalousies and West Indies Paints, subsidiaries of ICD Group Limited, a Matalon family-owned investment holding company. He subsequently rose to become coordinator for all manufacturing and the building products division of ICD Group Limited.

== Political career ==
Matalon first stood for elected office in the Parish Council Elections of 1969. He was elected Councillor for the Kingston and St. Andrew Corporation and subsequently as Mayor of Kingston from 1971 to 1973. In February 1973, after the PNP's victory at the polls in the 1972 general election, Matalon was appointed as Senator and Minister of State in the Ministry of Education in the Michael Manley-led administration. He served in this capacity until he was elevated to the position of Minister of Education, succeeding Sir Florizel Glasspole, who has been appointed Governor General. Glasspole was the first member of Parliament for Kingston East and Port Royal constituency, and had represented the area in Parliament for 29 years. Matalon successfully contested the resulting by-election, becoming the first Jamaican of Jewish descent to be elected to the House of Representatives. In 1974, the Ministry of National Security and Justice was created to replace the former ministries of home affairs and defense. Matalon was appointed as the first holder of the newly created cabinet portfolios. He was succeeded in his former position of Minister of Education by Sir Howard Cooke. Matalon stepped down as Minister of National Security and Justice after only two years in office due to failing health. He was succeeded as Minister of Justice by Carl Rattray and by Keble Munn as Minister of National Security.

== Honors and awards ==
Matalon was awarded the Order of Jamaica for public service in 1975. He was appointed Ambassador-at-large for Jamaica in February 1989. Mico University College, the oldest teacher-training institution in Jamaica, named its main auditorium the Eli Matalon Gymnasium in honour of Matalon.

== Personal life and death ==
Matalon married Hilary (née Surridge) on March 14, 1950. The couple had 3 sons and 2 daughters. In 1976, Matalon suffered a massive heart attack, which caused him to retire from public office. In later years he lived in Miami, Florida, where he died on October 31, 1999, at the age of 75.

== See also ==
- Ministry of Justice (Jamaica)
- List of education ministers of Jamaica
- List of mayors of Kingston, Jamaica

Political offices
| New ministerial post | Minister of National Security and Justice; 1974 – 1976 | Succeeded by Keble Munn (National Security); Carl Rattray (Justice) |
| Preceded by Sir Florizel Glasspole | Minister of Education; 1973 – 1974 | Succeeded by Sir Howard Cooke |
| Preceded by Emerson Barrett | Mayor of Kingston; 1971 – 1973 | Succeeded by Ralph Brown |
