= Hector Mitchell =

Hector Mitchell may refer to:

- Hector Mitchell (footballer)
- Hector Mitchell (politician)
