= William Greenfield (disambiguation) =

William Greenfield was Lord Chancellor of England and Archbishop of York.

William Greenfield may also refer to:

- William Greenfield (minister) (died 1827), Scottish minister, literary critic, author and mathematician
- William Greenfield (philologist) (1799–1831), English philologist
- William Smith Greenfield (1846–1919), British anatomist
