= Ministry of Justice (Jamaica) =

Federal ministry in Jamaica on law

The Ministry of Justice (headed by the Minister of Justice) was established in 2001 after having severed ties with the Ministry of National Security and Justice. As a result, prior to the change in 2001, there are past individuals who were referred to as the Minister of National Security and Justice. Additionally, certain Ministers of Justice has also served simultaneously as the Attorney General of Jamaica. The Ministry of Justice is responsible for tasks such as administering legislation, delivering justice services, and providing policy support and analyses of law-related issues."

== List of ministers ==
- Eli Matalon (1974–1976) [1st Minister of Justice]
- Carl Rattray Q.C. (1976–1980)
- Winston Spaulding Q.C. (1980–1986)
- Oswald Harding Q.C. (1986–1989)
- Errol Anderson (1989–1992)
- K.D. Knight Q.C. (1992-2001)
- Arnold J .Nicholson Q.C. (2001-2007)
- Dorothy Lightbourne C.D., Q.C. (2007–2011) [1st female]
- Delroy Chuck Q.C. (July–December 2011)
- Mark Golding (2012-2016)
- Delroy Chuck K.C. (2016–present)

== List of attorneys general ==
See Attorney General of Jamaica for a listing of the individuals who served pre-1962.

- Victor B. Grant Q.C. (1962-1972)
- Leacroft Robinson O.J., Q.C. (1972-1976)
- Carl Rattray Q.C.(1976–1980)
- Winston Spaulding Q.C. (1980–1986)
- Oswald Harding Q.C. (1986–1989)
- Carl Rattray Q.C. (1989–1993)
- David Coore Q.C. (1993-1995)
- Arnold J. Nicholson Q.C. (2001-2007)
- Dorothy Lightbourne C.D., Q.C. (2007-2011) [1st female]
- Ransford Braham Q.C. (July–December 2011)
- Patrick Atkinson Q.C. (2012–2016)
- Marlene Malahoo Forte Q.C. (2016–2022)
- Derrick McKoy K.C. (2022–present)

== See also ==
- Justice ministry
- Politics of Jamaica
