= Kingston Western (Jamaica Parliament constituency) =

Jamaican parliamentary constituency

Kingston Western is a parliamentary constituency represented in the House of Representatives of the Jamaican Parliament. It elects one Member of Parliament MP by the first past the post system of election. The constituency was one of the original 32 Parliamentary seats. West Kingston is dominated by the Jamaica Labour Party (JLP) which has held the seat continuously since 1955. JLP Prime Ministers Alexander Bustamante, Hugh Shearer, Edward Seaga and Bruce Golding all represented the seat at one time or another, although Bustamante and Shearer did not represent the constituency during their premierships.

== Boundaries ==
The constituency covers the Tivoli Gardens, Fletchers Land, Hanna Town, Rose Town, Greenwich Farm Central Downtown and Denham Town areas of Kingston.

== Members of Parliament ==
Election	Member	Party
1944	Alexander Bustamante	Jamaica Labour Party
1949	Kenneth Hill	People's National Party
1955	Hugh Shearer	Jamaica Labour Party
1962	Edward Seaga	Jamaica Labour Party
2005 by-election	Bruce Golding	Jamaica Labour Party
2011	Desmond McKenzie	Jamaica Labour Party
2020	Desmond McKenzie	Jamaica Labour Party

== Elections ==
General Election 2020: Kingston West
Party	Candidate	Votes	%	±%
JLP	Desmond McKenzie	8,480	90.58	
PNP	Joseph Witter	880	9.42	
Total votes		9,360	100.0	
Turnout				
JLP hold				

General Election 2011: Kingston West
Party	Candidate	Votes	%	±%
JLP	Desmond McKenzie	8,942	82.80	
PNP	Earl Dawkins	1,825	16.90	
Marcus Garvey People's	Arlington Seaton	32	0.30	
Total votes		10,799	100.0	
Turnout				
JLP hold				

General Election 2007: Kingston West
Party	Candidate	Votes	%	±%
JLP	Bruce Golding	10,202	86.06	
PNP	Joseph Witter	1,653	13.94	
Total votes		11,855	100.0	
Turnout			70.97	
JLP hold				

Jamaica by-election (April 13, 2005): Kingston West
Party	Candidate	Votes	%	±%
JLP	Bruce Golding	8,503	87.61%	
PNP	Joseph Witter	1,181	12.17%	
National Democratic Movement	Micheal A. Elliot	12	0.12%	
Independent	Astor G. Black	9	0.09%	
Total votes		9,705	100.0	
Turnout			55.25	
JLP hold				
