= Carl Rattray =

Jamaican jurist and politician

The Honourable Carl Rattray QC MP

Minister of Justice
- In office 1976–1980
- Preceded by: Eli Matalon
- Succeeded by: Winston Spaulding

Attorney General of Jamaica
- In office 1976–1980
- Preceded by: Leacroft Robinson
- Succeeded by: Winston Spaulding
- In office 1989–1993
- Preceded by: Oswald Harding
- Succeeded by: David Coore

Member of Parliament for Saint Catherine South Eastern
- In office 1989–1993

Personal details
- Born: Raphael Carl Ratrray; September 19, 1929 St. Elizabeth, Colony of Jamaica
- Died: March 14, 2012 (aged 82)
- Party: People's National Party

Raphael Carl Rattray QC (18 September 1929 – 14 March 2012) was a Jamaican jurist and politician.

Rattray was born in 1929 in St. Elizabeth and attended St. Jago High School. He began his career in law in England before being called to the Jamaica Bar in 1958. In 1969, he was appointed a Queen's Counsel. He was also a founder of the law firm of Rattray, Patterson, Rattray.

== Political career ==
Rattray was one of the founding members of the People's National Party as well as a founding member and past chairman of the Jamaica Council for Human Rights.

From 1978 to 1980, Rattray was the leader of government business in the Senate. In 1989, he was elected as the MP for the constituency of South East St Catherine.

Rattray served as the Attorney General from 1976 to 1980 and from 1989 to 1993. During the latter term, he concurrently served as the Minister of Justice from 1989 to 1992 and subsequently as the Minister Legal Affairs from 1992 to 1993.

In 1993, Rattray was appointed President of the Court of Appeal. He served in this capacity until 1999, when he retired from the bench.

== Death ==
On 14 March 2012, Rattray died at his home on St. Andrew. He was 82 years of age and had been ailing for the previous four years. He was survived by his wife, Audrey, two sons and two daughters.
