= Delroy Williams =

Jamaican politician

The Honourable Delroy Williams CD MP

Minister of State in the Ministry of Local Government
- Incumbent
- Assumed office 19 September 2025
- Minister: Desmond McKenzie

Member of the Jamaican Senate
- In office 2017 – 11 February 2025
- Appointed by: Andrew Holness

Mayor of Kingston
- In office 2016–2024
- Preceded by: Angela Brown-Burke
- Succeeded by: Andrew Swaby

Member of Parliament for Clarendon Central
- Incumbent
- Assumed office 2025

Personal details
- Born: July 13, 1980 (age 46)
- Party: Jamaica Labour Party
- Relations: Donovan Williams (brother)
- Education: University of the West Indies (BSc)

Delroy Hugh Williams (born 1980) is a Jamaican politician from the Jamaica Labour Party, who currently serves as a member of the House of Representatives Clarendon Central since the 2025 Jamaican general election. He was previously a member of the Senate of Jamaica.

He is the councillor for the Seivwright Gardens Division. In 2016, he was sworn in as mayor of Kingston succeeding Angela Brown-Burke.
