= Rahabi Ezekiel =

Rabbinical writer

Ezekiel Rahabi (1694–1771) was the chief Jewish merchant of the Dutch East India Company in Cochin, India for almost 50 years. Rabbi Rahabi Ezekiel, (or Ezekiel Rahabi) was from Aleppo, in modern Syria. A rabbinical writer known only through his polemical Hebrew translation of the New Testament - The Book of the Gospel Belonging to the Followers of Jesus (c.1750).

The translation contains all the books of the New Testament and was translated between 1741 and 1756 by a certain Ezekiel Rahabi (not R'dkibi, pace Franz Delitzsch p.108) in "an uneven and faulty Hebrew with a strong anti-Christian bias." Oo 1:32 reads: "Heaven is my witness that I have not translated this, God forfend, to believe it, but to understand it and know how to answer the heretics . . . that our true Messiah will come. Amen." The 1756 edition appears to be the work of two different translators - a less educated Sephardi writer (Matthew-John), Ezekiel Rahabi himself, and a more educated German rabbi (Acts-Revelation) Leopold Immanuel Jacob van Dort.
