= Vorobeichik =

Vorobeichik, Vorobeytschik, Barabeitchik and other variants derived from Russian: Воробейчик is a Jewish family name. It is an East Slavic patronymic derivation from the nickname Vorobey using the diminutive suffix -chik. A similarly constructed surname is Soloveitchik ("little nightingale"). Notable people with the surname include:

A branch of this family moved to Mexico in the 1920s and the last name was changed to “Berebichez”. There are several prominent members of the family.

- Issay Dobrowen (1891-1953), born Itschok Barabeitchik, Russian/Soviet-Norwegian pianist, composer and conductor
- Moi Ver (1904-1995), born Moses Vorobeichic, Israeli photographer and painter
- Yevgeny Vorobeichik, general director of Russian oil company Alliance

== Fictional characters ==
- Orderly Vorobeichik, a character from the 1960 Soviet film Probation
- Inspector Venceslas Vorobeychik from the 1942 French comedy thriller The Murderer Lives at Number 21
- Midshipman Vorobeichik, a character in the novel Tsushima by Alexey Novikov-Priboy
