= William Bengo' Collyer =

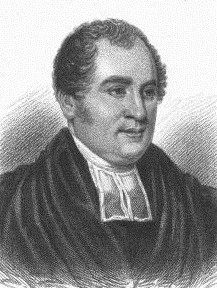
William Bengo' Collyer

William Bengo' Collyer (1782–1854) was an English Congregational minister and religious writer,

== Life ==
He was the only surviving child of Thomas Collyer, a builder of Deptford, where he was born on 14 April 1782. After education at the Leathersellers' Company's school in Lewisham, he entered Independent College, Homerton as a scholar in 1798.

In 1800 Collyer began his ministry in a small congregation at Peckham, over which he was ordained in December 1801. Under his ministry the congregation increased, and the chapel was several times enlarged. Previous to this, he had in 1813 received an invitation to succeed to the pulpit at Salters' Hall Chapel, which, with the consent of the congregation at Peckham, he accepted, an arrangement being made that he should occupy both pulpits. The Peckham chapel was in 1816 rebuilt and reopened under the name of Hanover Chapel.

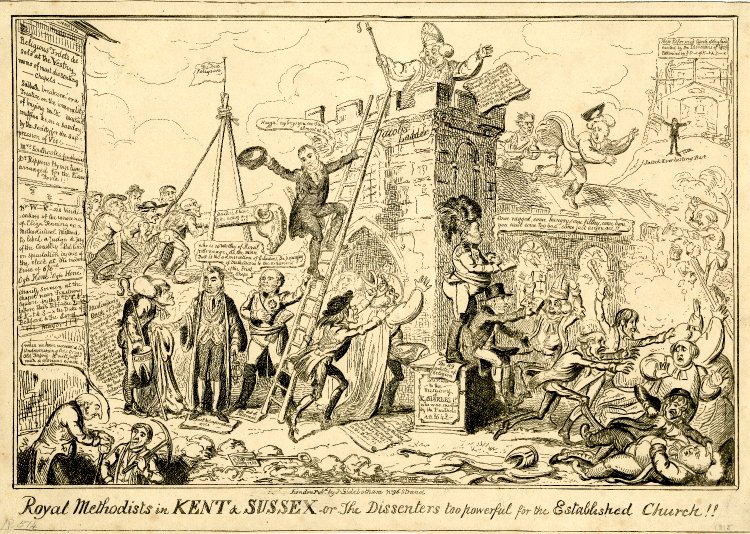
Satirical print by George Cruikshank on the opening of Hanover Chapel by William Bengo' Collyer, a nonconformist minister, and its support by two Royal Dukes

The University of Edinburgh awarded Collyer the degree of D.D. in 1808. In 1812 he succeeded Joseph Fox as joint secretary of the London Society for Promoting Christianity Amongst the Jews, retiring with his Anglican colleague Thomas Fry in 1814. Collyer and Fry's translations into Hebrew of the Gospels of Matthew and Mark, carried out with the help of Judah D'Allemand, were published in 1813 and 1815 respectively.

From 1820 to 1824 Collyer edited, with James Baldwin Brown the elder and Thomas Raffles, The Investigator, a quarterly. It attacked Lord Byron and Percy Bysshe Shelley as immoral. The article "Licentious Publications in High Life" of 1822, after Shelley's death, received a reply "Canting Slander: To the Reverend William Bengo Collyer" over a number of issues of The Examiner, attributed to William Hazlitt. In 1823 Collyer rode out a scandal around his examination of young men, in the Addington Square baths, that was brought up in The Lancet. That same year, he was elected to the American Philosophical Society.

Collyer died aged 71 in 1854. A funeral sermon was preached at Hanover Chapel by John Morison, on 16 January.

== Works ==
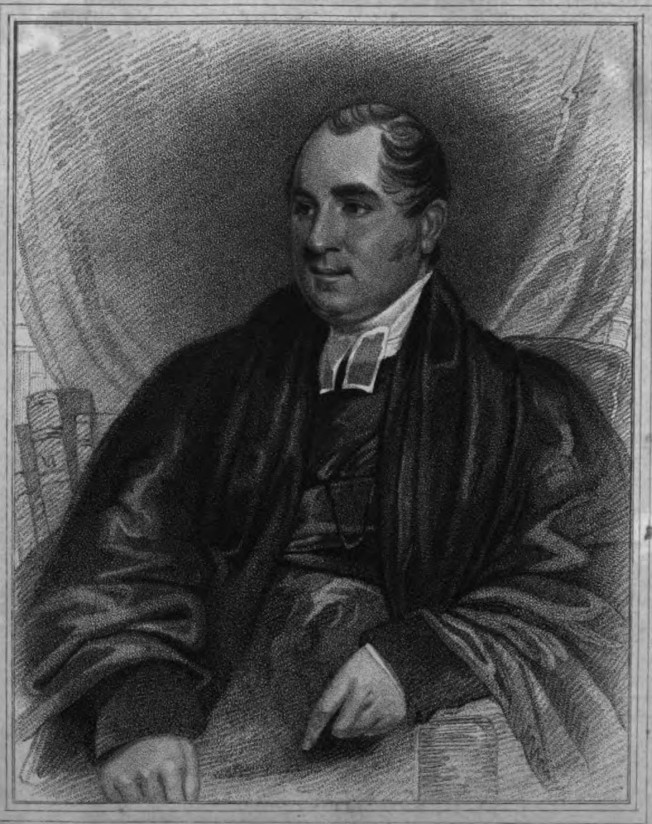
William Bengo' Collyer, from the Evangelical Magazine, 1823

Collyer was the author of:

- Fugitive Pieces for the use of Schools, 1803
- Hymns designed as a Supplement to Dr. Watts, 1812
- Services suited to the Solemnisation of Matrimony, administration of Baptism, &c., with Original Hymns, 1837.

He published sermons, and several series of popular lectures on scriptural subjects, including:

- Lectures on Scripture Facts, 1807
- Scripture Prophecy, 1809
- Scripture Miracles, 1812
- Scripture Parables, 1815
- Scripture Doctrines, 1818
- Scripture Duties, 1819, and
- Scripture Comparison, 1823.

From 1802, Collyer published numerous hymns.

== Family ==
With his wife Mary, daughter and coheiress of Thomas Hawkes of Lutterworth, Collyer left one daughter, Mary Anne Hawkes Collyer. She married the physician Philip Lovell Phillips.
