= Ralph Brown (politician) =

Jamaican politician

The Honourable Ralph Eugene Brown OJ, CD

Minister of Local Government and Community Development
- In office 1989–1992
- Monarch: Elizabeth II
- Governors General: Sir Florizel Glasspole; Sir Howard Cooke
- Prime Minister: Michael Manley
- Preceded by: Neville Lewis
- Succeeded by: Desmond Leakey

Minister of Local Government and Community Development
- In office 1980–1980
- Monarch: Elizabeth II
- Governor General: Sir Florizel Glasspole
- Prime Minister: Michael Manley
- Preceded by: William Isaacs
- Succeeded by: Neville Lewis

Minister of Works
- In office 1978–1980
- Monarch: Elizabeth II
- Governor General: Sir Florizel Glasspole
- Prime Minister: Michael Manley
- Preceded by: Ernest Peart
- Succeeded by: Anthony Spaulding

Personal details
- Born: May 7, 1924 Kingston, Colony of Jamaica, British Empire
- Died: December 31, 1999 (aged 75)
- Party: People's National Party
- Spouse: Veronica Albertha (née Johnson) (m. 1958)

Ralph Eugene Brown OJ, CD (May 17, 1924 – 1999) was a Jamaican politician who represented the People's National Party (PNP). He served twice as mayor of Kingston from 1974 to 1977 and again from 1986 to 1989. He was Minister of Works (1978–1980), and Minister of Local Government and Community Development (1989–1992).

== Early life and education ==
Brown was born on May 17, 1924, in Kingston. He was educated at Kingston Senior School, now Kingston High School.

== Political career ==
Brown first served as a Councillor for the Kingston and St. Andrew Corporation (KSAC) from 1950 to 1958. In the 1958 Federal election, he defeated George P McFarlane of the Jamaica Labour Party (JLP) by 2,042 votes to become the Member of Parliament for the West Indies Federation from the parish of Kingston. He served in this position until Jamaica's independence and exit from the West Indies Federation in 1962. Brown again served as Councillor for the KSAC from 1969, becoming Deputy Mayor of Kingston (1973–1974) and Mayor of Kingston (1974–1976). In the 1976 general election, he polled 7,667 votes against the JLP's Ivan Moore to win the Kingston West Central constituency for the PNP. Brown served as PNP general secretary from 1978, following the resignation of DK Duncan from that position. He was also a past Vice President of the PNP. He served as Minister of State, then Minister of Works (1978–1980) in the cabinet of Prime Minister Michael Manley. He also served briefly as Minister of Local Government and Community Development in 1980. When the PNP lost the 1980 general election, he again won his seat, polling 5,361 votes to the JLP's Ivan Moore (3,803). He did not contest the 1983 general election, which was boycotted by the PNP. Brown again served as Mayor of Kingston from 1986 to 1989. In the 1989 general elections, Brown defeated Olivia Grange (JLP), by 1,869 votes to win the constituency of Kingston Central. He was again appointed Minister of Local Government and Community Development in the cabinet of Michael Manley. He served in this position until his resignation in early 1992. In 1993, Brown retired from representational politics. He was succeeded as member of parliament by Colonel Leslie Lloyd.

== Honors and awards ==
In 1975, Brown was awarded the Order of Distinction, Commander class. He also received the Order of Jamaica. In 2005, the Kingston and St. Andrew Corporation (KSAC) building in downtown Kingston, was renamed in honour of Brown.

== Personal life and death ==
Brown married Veronica Albertha Johnson on June 4, 1958. He died in 1999.

== See also ==
- List of mayors of Kingston, Jamaica

Political offices
Preceded by Eli Matalon	Mayor of Kingston; 1974 – 1977	Succeeded by George Mason
Preceded by Ernest Peart	Minister of Works; 1978 – 1980	Succeeded by Anthony Spaulding
Preceded by William Isaacs	Minister of Local Government and Community Development; 1980 – 1980	Succeeded by Neville Lewis
Preceded by Edward Miller	Mayor of Kingston; 1986 – 1989	Succeeded by Marie Atkins
Preceded by Neville Lewis	Minister of Local Government and Community Development; 1989 – 1992	Succeeded by Desmond Leakey
