= Leopold Immanuel Jacob van Dort =

Translator of an Indian version of the Hebrew New Testament and a Hebrew Quran

- Born: 1712; The Hague, Dutch Republic
- Died: 1761 (aged 48–49)
- Education: University of Leipzig
- Occupation: Professor of Hebrew Language
- Known for: Hebrew Quran of the Library of Congress, rabbinical Hebrew New Testament from Cochin

Leopold Immanuel Jacob van Dort (1712–1761) was a Dutch Hebrew professor, responsible for translating an Indian version of the Hebrew New Testament and a Hebrew Quran.

Leopold Immanuel Jacob van Dort was born Jewish in 1712 in The Hague, Netherlands. He converted to Catholicism in December 1745 in Aachen. He studied briefly philosophy at the University of Leipzig with professor Johann Friedrich May in 1753. In 1754 he was enlisted by the Dutch East India Company (VOC) to work as a professor of Hebrew Language at the Seminary of Colombo, Ceylon. In 1756 he traveled to Cochin, India, where he was commissioned by Ezekiel Rahabi to finish the translation of the Hebrew New Testament (1741–1756), which Claudius Buchanan took with him to England and currently resides in the Cambridge University Library. Ezekiel Rahabi also commissioned van Dort as the translator of the Hebrew Quran (1757–1761), which resides in the Library of Congress in Washington. He also arranged the printing of the prayer books of the Jews of Cochin, India, in Amsterdam in 1757, through the office of Tobias Boas (nl), whom he knew from his childhood. Van Dort is further known for his 1757 translations of the excerpts of the chronicles of the Jews of Cochin.

Van Dort died in 1761, at the age of 48.
