= Thomas Fry (priest, born 1775) =

English cleric and academic

Thomas Fry (1775–1860) was an English cleric and academic.

== Life ==
His father was Peter Fry, of Compton Bassett, Somerset. He matriculated at Oriel College, Oxford in 1792, graduating B.A. in 1796. He was ordained deacon in 1797, by George Pretyman Tomline, and priest in 1798, by Edward Smallwell. At this period he was living in Axbridge, and impressed Hannah More with his maturity and boldness as a preacher. He took his M.A. at Lincoln College, in 1798.

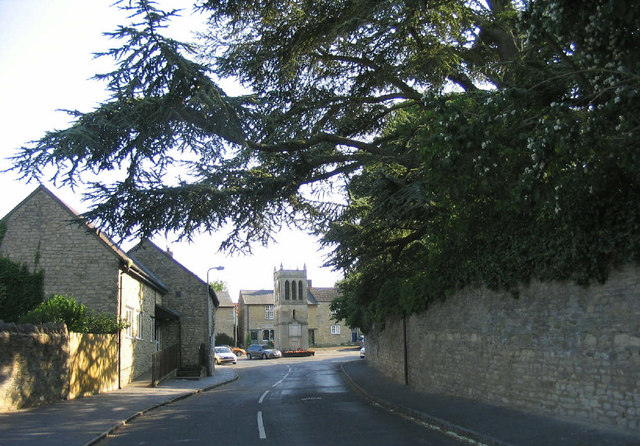
Emberton clock tower, in the centre of the village, erected by Thomas Fry to the memory of his wife Margaret

Fry had a position as tutor at Lincoln College, and curacies at Abingdon and Hanwell. He gave up his fellowship at Lincoln to become chaplain at the Lock Hospital Chapel in London, the successor to Thomas Scott and Charles Edward de Coetlogon who resigned in 1802. There was a new selection of hymns, with Fry creating a hymnbook that replaced over half of Martin Madan's, and charity school boys made up a choir. There his assistant was Legh Richmond, and they became lifelong friends. Fry became rector of Emberton, in Buckinghamshire and the Diocese of Oxford, in 1804, where he was also the patron. Tithe commutation had taken place in 1798. He gave up the chaplaincy, by 1812.

Fry joined Joseph Fox as joint secretary of the London Society for Promoting Christianity Amongst the Jews in 1810. In 1812 Fox was replaced by William Bengo' Collyer. Collyer and Fry both retired in 1814, and were replaced by Charles Sleech Hawtrey.

Fry was granted a license of non-residence at Emberton in 1848, on the grounds of age and infirmity.

== Works ==
Fry wrote:

- The Necessity of Religious Knowledge to Salvation (1805), Christ Church, Newgate Street for the SPCK
- The Reviewer Reviewed (1821) as "Heresiae Mastix", in defence of César Malan.
- Domestic Portraiture; or the successful application of religious principle in the education of a family, exemplified in the memoirs of three of the deceased children of the Rev. L. Richmond (1833), on the family life of his friend Legh Richmond.
- A Father's Reason for Repose (1839), by "the author of Domestic Portraiture", and an extract published as The Causes and Cure of Scepticism.
- New Testament in Hebrew (Berit hadashah 'al pi Mashiah: ne'etak mi-leshon Yavan lileshon 'Ivri. London: A. Macintosh,1817). Published as an early edition of the London Jews' Society's New Testament in Hebrew. Text in vocalized Hebrew; assisted by G. B Collier and other scholars

== Family ==
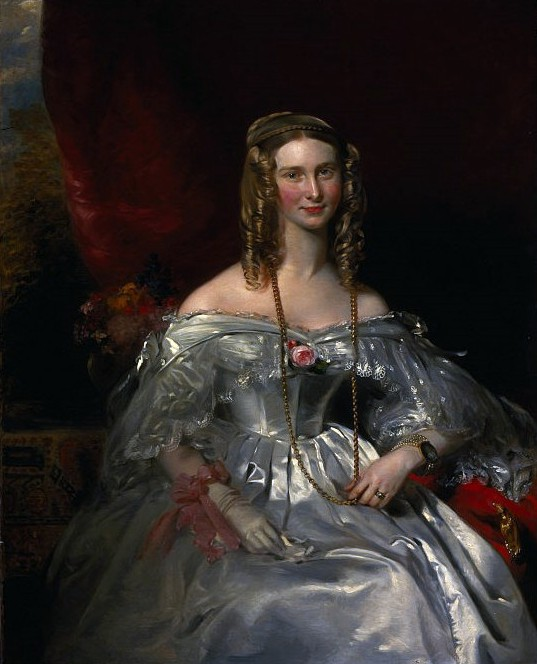
Hannah Fry, 1838 portrait by Andrew Geddes

On 23 September 1802, as vicar of Radley, Fry married Anne Cresswell, daughter of Estcourt Cresswell (died 1823) of Bibury, by his first marriage to Mary Wotton. She died in 1811, and he then married Margaret Henrietta Middleton. The children of this marriage were:

- Peter Samuel, eldest son, married in 1840 to Katherine Eliza Anne Williams, daughter of Rev. John Charles Williams, and father of Thomas Charles Fry.
- Thomas Osmond, second son, died in 1846, aged 26.
- Charles Simeon, died in 1839, aged 18.
- Hannah Mary Elizabeth, only daughter, married Harris Prendergast in 1832.

Mary Ann Foster, a widow, married Fry as his third wife, in 1846. She was the second daughter of Sir William Chambers Bagshawe (1771–1832), a physician (originally Darling), and had married her first husband, William Foster, in 1817.

Complex litigation in Chancery over Cresswell family trusts followed Fry's death in 1860. He had claimed in 1845 title to and a life interest in estates of the Wottons of Inglebourne, through his deceased first wife, which had led to Spitchwick House, Widecombe-in-the-Moor in Devon being attacked.
