= Bill Caddick (footballer) =

English footballer

Personal information
- Full name: William Caddick
- Date of birth: 14 March 1898
- Place of birth: Wolverhampton, England
- Date of death: 1981 (aged 82–83)
- Position: Half-back

Senior career*
Years	Team	Apps	(Gls)
1919–1920	Wellington Town		
1920–1927	Wolverhampton Wanderers	147	(4)
1927–1928	Wellington Town		
Total		147	(4)
- * Club domestic league appearances and goals

William Caddick (4 March 1898 – 1981) was an English footballer who played in the Football League for Wolverhampton Wanderers.
