= Keble Munn =

Jamaican politician and agriculturalist

The Honourable Keble Aubrey Munn OJ (15 February 1920 - 14 April 2008) was a Jamaican politician and agriculturalist.

== Biography ==
Munn received his education at Wolmer's Schools. After graduation, he traveled to Canada, where he enlisted in that country's army in order to serve in World War II. During his wartime service, which lasted more than four years, Munn was stationed in Belgium, England, and France.

After the war, he returned to Jamaica, and in 1956 he began his political career as a Councillor in the Kingston and St. Andrew Corporation. The next year, he received an appointment as Deputy Mayor of Kingston, and in 1959, while with the People's National Party, he was elected as a Member of Parliament representing the East Rural St. Andrew seat. He held that seat until 1967, when he was elected to represent South East St. Andrew, and then held that seat in turn until 1976, when he was elected as the representative for Eastern St. Andrew. This last seat Munn held until his retirement from politics in 1980.

Munn also held several cabinet-level positions during his political career. He was Jamaica's Minister of Agriculture and Minister of National Security from 1959–1962, and again from 1972–1980. His second term as Minister of National Security included the country's 1976 State of Emergency.

Munn was also notable as an agriculturalist. His family had begun growing coffee in 1885, and during his lifetime he worked diligently to restore the reputation of Jamaican Blue Mountain Coffee. He was the owner and director of the Mavis Bank Central Factory, in Mavis Bank, Jamaica where he helped pioneer the use of chicken manure as an organic fertilizer for coffee within Jamaica. He became the first to directly export the Blue Mountain bean to the Japanese market in 1953, and in 1973, he helped pass the Coffee Industry Regulation Act, which defined the regions which were exclusively able to use the Blue Mountain mark when selling their coffee. Munn also served as chairman of the Coffee Industry Board and the Agriculture Credit Board, and was a life member of the Jamaica Agricultural Society.

In 2007, Munn was honored with the Order of Jamaica, in recognition of his political and agricultural accomplishments. Six months later, he suffered a stroke, and then died of related complications at the University Hospital of the West Indies.

Munn had four children: daughter Gwyneth from his marriage to Lillian Bell (deceased) and son Keble Gordon and daughters Leiza and Jodi from his second wife Yvonne Murray.
