= William Robertson (Hebraist) =

William Robertson (fl. 1650 – 1680) was a Scottish Hebraist. He was educated at Edinburgh University, taught Hebrew in London from 1653–1680, then in 1680 was appointed lecturer in Hebrew at Cambridge University.

== Life ==
A graduate of Edinburgh, he is identified by Edgar Cardew Marchant in the Dictionary of National Biography as probably the William Robertson who was laureated by Duncan Forester in April 1645. From 1653 to 1680 he lived in the City of London and taught Hebrew. In 1680 he was appointed university teacher of Hebrew at Cambridge at a salary of £20 a year.

Robertson believed Hebrew could be learned by ordinary people with a minimum of linguistic background. In the Interregnum he was supported by patrons such as John Sadler, William Steele and Lady Katherine Ranelagh, and was able to publish freely. In theology he followed David Dickson and Robert Douglas. After 1660 he had little support, and lost much of his version of the Hebrew New Testament of Elias Hutter in the Great Fire of London.

== Works ==
Robertson's works include:

- A Gate or Door to the Holy Tongue opened in English, London, 1653; this reappeared with a few changes in 1654, as The First Gate or Outward Door to the Holy Tongue, and was followed in 1655 by The Second Gate or the Inner Door.
- Compendious Hebrew Lexicon, London, 1654; this was favourably received, and was edited by Nahum Joseph in 1814.
- An Admonitory Epistle unto Mr. Richard Baxter and Mr. Thomas Hotchkiss, about their applications, or misapplications, rather, of several texts of Scripture, tending chiefly to prove that the afflictions of the godly are proper punishments; in the second of two appended dissertations he defends William Twisse's definition of pardon. London, 1655.
- The Hebrew Text of the Psalms and Lamentations, with text in Roman letters parallel, London, 1656; dedicated to John Sadler, his patron.
- Novum Testamentum lingua Hebræa, London.
- The Hebrew portion of Gouldman's Copious Dictionary, Cambridge, 1674. In the work edited by Francis Gouldman.
- Schrevelii Lexicon Manuale Græco-Latinum, with many additions, Cambridge, 1676. Edition of the lexicon of Cornelis Schrevel.
- Thesaurus linguæ sanctæ, London, 1680; this was used largely by Christian Stock and Johann Friedrich Fischer in their Clavis linguæ sanctæ, Leipzig, 1753.
- Phraseologia generalis: ... A full, large, and general phrase book, Cambridge, 1681; re-issued 1693, reprinted 1696; re-edited in 1824.
- Index alphabeticus hebræo-biblicus, Cambridge, 1683; Johann Leusden translated it into Latin and published it at Utrecht in 1687 as Lexicon novum hebræo-latinum.
- Manipulus linguæ sanctæ, Cambridge, 1683.
- Liber Psalmorum et Threni Jeremiæ, in Hebrew, Cambridge, 1685.
