= Henry Bauchet =

Joseph-Gustave-Henri Bauchet
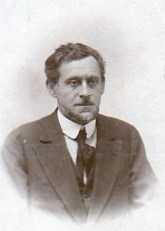
- Born: 22 April 1879; Frévent, France
- Died: 19 December 1970 (aged 91); Lyon
- Occupation: Engineer

Henry Bauchet was a French ingénier (1879–1970) and inventor. He was born on 22 April 1879 in Frevent, Pas-de-Calais and died on 19 December 1970 in Lyon. He designed and manufactured the first prototype of modern automobile, called "La Sirène" from 1899 to 1907.

He graduated from School of Arts and Crafts in Châlons-en-Champagne and was one of the first holders of a driving licence in France.

After a life dedicated to the automobile, in 1963, in Valencia, he was knocked down by a car, which left him with a slight limp. A street in Rethel is named after him.

== The Bauchet car ==
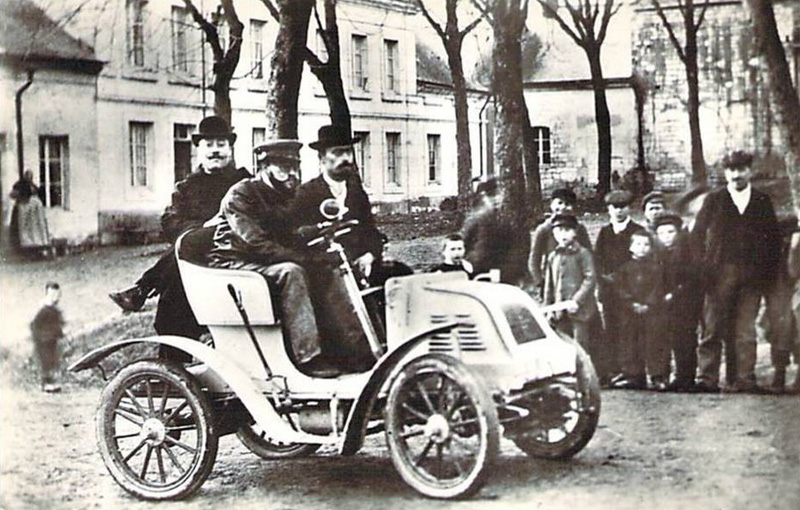
Henry Bauchet driving his 5CV Lessieux-Bauchet, Rethel, Ardennes, France, 1900

In 1899, in Rethel in the Ardennes, a vehicle called La Sirène designed by engineers Henry Bauchet and his collaborator Charles Schmidt took to the road. Until then, automobiles looked more like carriages with large wooden wheels with a motor under the seats. La Sirène was an innovative car with a look close to the ones we know today, with a hooded engine at the front, a steering wheel, a body and four metal wheels equipped with all-new tires invented in 1891 by the Michelin brothers. It had a 5/8 cv twin-cylinder engine, 4-speed transmission and shaft drive. It was fitted with a 4-seat tonneau body.

In 1901 The Siren was entered in the Grand Prix of Pau and won a race in the light car (less than 650 kg) category and in June 1901 took part in the Grand Prix Paris-Berlin, driven by two drivers A.Collin (8th in light cars, and 40th overall) and Chevrein (retirement).

== SA des Moteurs Henri Baucher ==
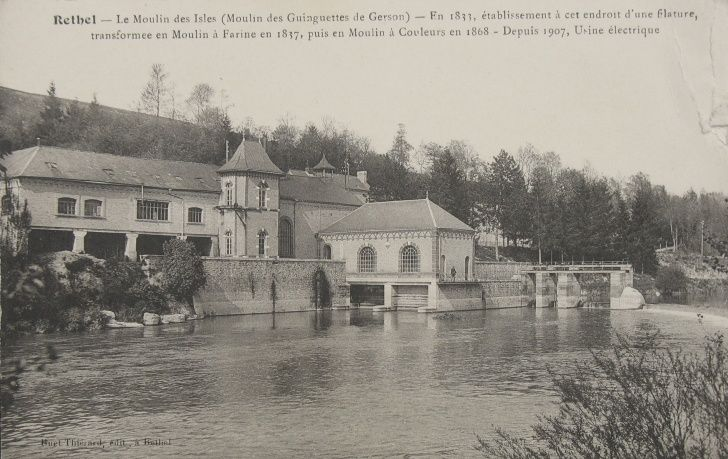
The factory before conversion to electric power in 1907.

In 1902 Bauchet's associate Charles Schmidt, experiencing financial difficulties, went to America where he joined Packard. Henry Bauchet remained at the head of the firm, raised the funds necessary to buy the equipment and continued building more cars.

Following La Sirène, a production car called the Henry Bauchet was introduced in 1903. It was a 5/8 twin-cylinder car built in Rethel, which was sold directly to the public and was called L'Ardennais.

In 1904, Henry Bauchet whose firm Lessieux-Bauchet was dissolved in 1901, moved in to part of an old mill by the river. From 1905 to 1907, the former Moulin des Isles was gradually transformed to electrical power after its acquisition by the Société Anonyme des Usines à Gaz du Nord et de l'Est.

A hundred vehicles left the factory before production stopped in 1907 because of too much competition. They then concentrated on stationary engines many of which were used in agriculture and in 1909 he built a tractor and, at the outbreak of war in 1914, he made his first tracked tractor.

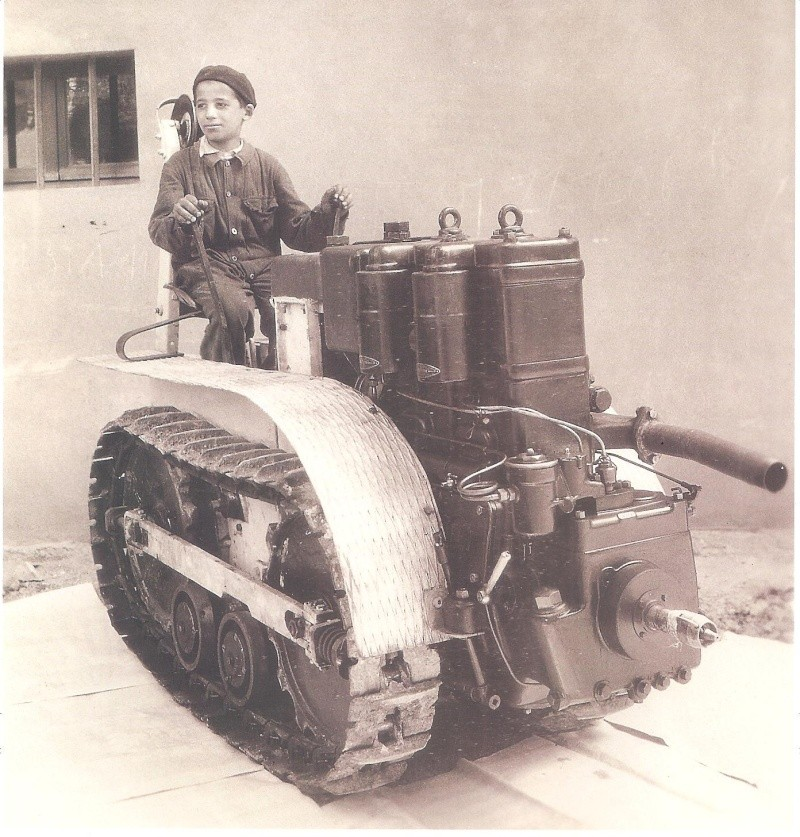
Bauchet tracked tractor

During World War 1, the factory was moved to Sens, on the banks of the River Yonne. Barges on the river were pulled by horses leading to Baucher adapting his engines for boat propulsion.

During World War 2 and the German occupation of France in 1940, Henri Bauchet moved their offices to Lyon, at 1 rue Jeanne-d'Arc, but the production remaining located in Rethel.

In the 1960s production of tractors finally stopped and the plant was converted to general engineering.

The factory closed down permanently in the 1990s.
