= Tanakh Ram =

Type of Tanakh translation

Tanakh Ram (Hebrew: תָּנָ״ךְ רָ״ם) is a translation of the Tanakh from Hebrew and Aramaic texts to Modern Hebrew. Published by RAM Publishing House Ltd. and Miskal Ltd., the work was translated by Polish-Israeli linguist Avraham Ahuvya.

== Publications ==
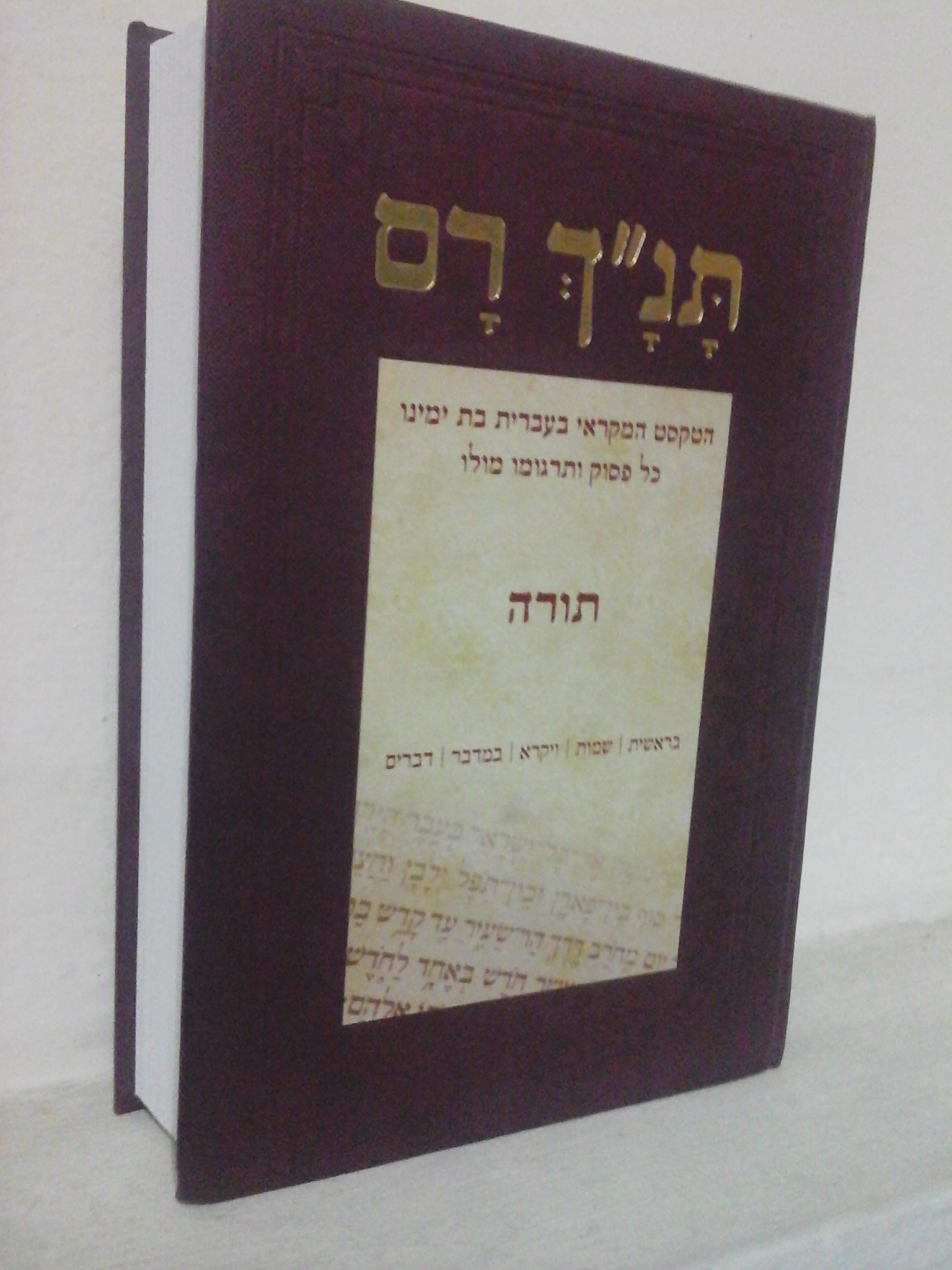
Tanakh Ram, volume I (the Torah).

The first volume, the Torah, was published in 2010, and the second one in 2011. Two more volumes, corresponding to the latter prophets and to the Writings, are currently being prepared. The text of each one of the books of the Bible is presented in Ancient Hebrew on the right and on the left there is a parallel column, in a different font type, with the Modern Hebrew text. At the end of each volume there is a section with tables of measures and weights aimed to be a reference to the reader.

Up to October 2014 there have been published two volumes corresponding to the Torah or Moses' Law, and to the former prophets. The Torah, of dark red hardcovers and 760 pages, includes the books of Genesis, Exodus, Leviticus, Numbers and Deuteronomy; the second volume, dark blue and with 621 pages, includes Joshua, Judges, Samuel and Kings.

== Reception ==
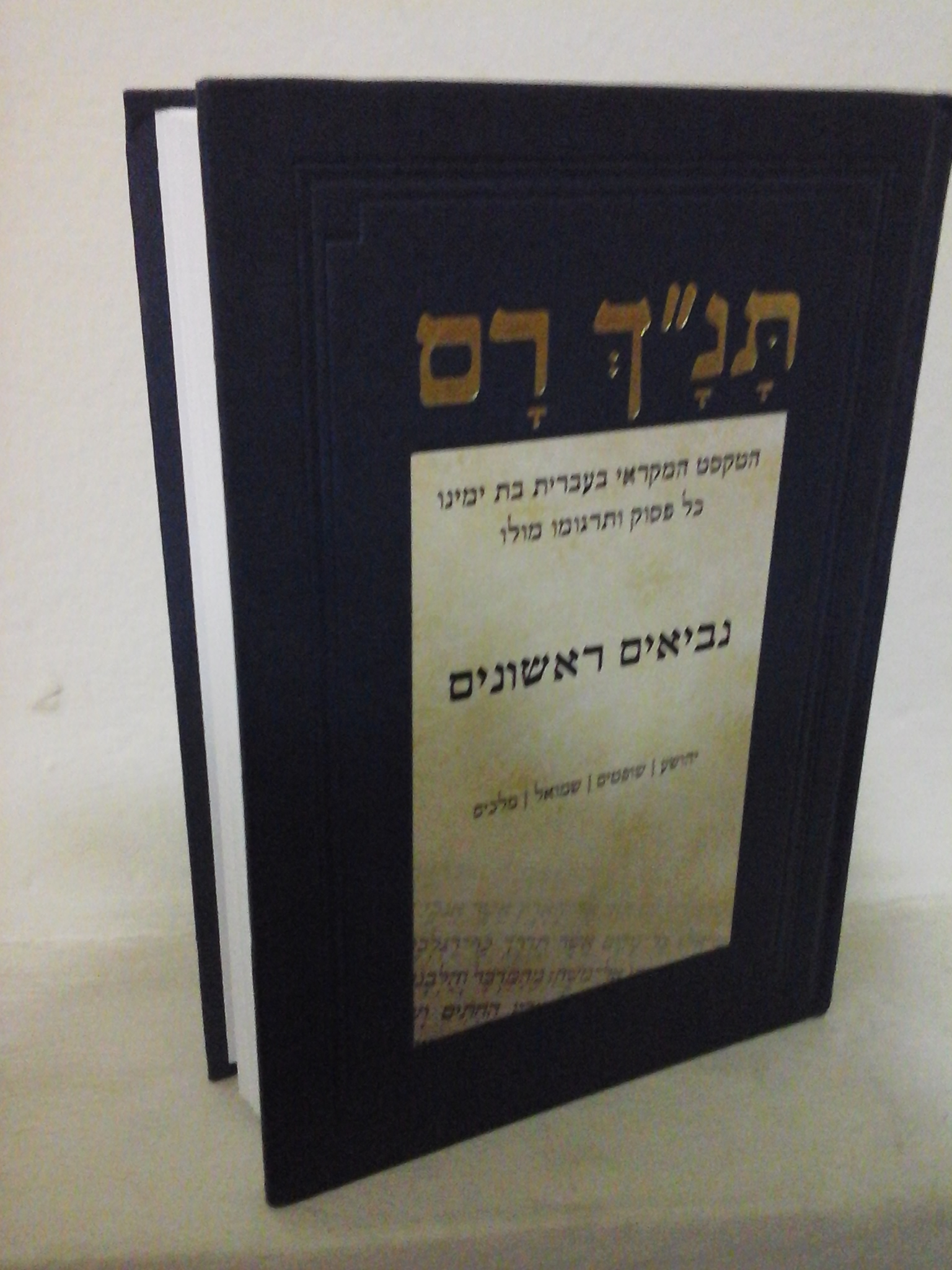
Tanakh Ram Volume II (former prophets).

Being a new translation from the one phase to another of the same language, its publication caused diverse opinions among the Jewish community in Israel. Some sectors argue that it is inconvenient for the reading of the sacred text in that it deviates from the traditional reading established by the masoretes, while other sectors consider that this new translation will allow the new generations to get closer to the Old Hebrew text. Linguist Ghil'ad Zuckermann supported the idea behind the Tanakh Ram since, in his own words, "The bottom line is that Israelis misunderstand the Hebrew Bible".
