= Richard Caddick =

Richard Caddick (1740–1819) was an English Hebraist. He revised William Robertson's New Testament and added his own translation of the Epistle to the Romans.

He also wrote Hebrew made Easy, or an Introduction to the Hebrew Language.

== Life ==
He was baptised in 1741 at the Unitarian meeting house in Moor Street, Birmingham. He was educated at Christ Church, Oxford, taking the degree of B.A. there on 5 June 1776, and that of M.A. on 20 June 1799.

In 1802 Caddick published three sermons: 'True Christianity,’ 'Peace the Christian's Happiness,’ and 'Counsel for Christians.' In 1805 he issued proposals for printing by subscription a Hebrew and English edition of the Book of Common Prayer, an annotated edition of the Old and New Testaments in Hebrew and English, and 'A Volume of Sermons preached in the Parish Churches in and about the Cities of London and Westminster from 1780 to 1804.' It seems, however, that none of these works were actually published. During the last forty years of his life he lived in or near London—in Whitehall, at Islington, and at Fulham, where he died on 30 May 1819.
