= Helen Caddick =

English travel writer

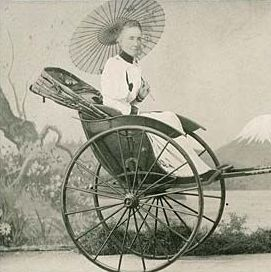
- Caddick, 1893
- Born: 1 January 1845
- Died: 4 June 1927 (aged 82)
- Occupation: Travel writer
- Notable work: A White Woman in Central Africa

Helen Caddick (1845 – 4 July 1927) was an English travel writer. She travelled the world between 1889 and 1914, writing A White Woman in Central Africa in 1900.

== Life ==
Caddick lived in York Road, Edgbaston. She travelled the world between 1889 and 1914, including a journey in the African interior with a team of hired men to carry her bags and her conveyance. In 1891, Caddick crossed Canada to reach Japan, but she first returned to Britain when a friend fell ill. She returned to travelling, and by August 1892 began globetrotting eastwards instead, travelling via South Africa onto India and China. She arrived in Japan in 1893.

In 1900, she published A White Woman in Central Africa, a travel memoir. The Pall Mall Gazette wrote: "The author of this very entertaining record of nearly six months' travel may certainly claim to be a pioneer, not in the sense of having visited virgin regions, but as being the first lady who has toured from the Zambesi's mouth to Tanganyika." The review noted that unlike female missionaries, she travelled solo and "on no sort of business but pleasure and observation."

A local paper wrote in 1900: "It will, no doubt, be somewhat of a surprise to many Edgbastonians to learn that they have living in their midst so adventurous a lady as Miss Helen Caddick, who has explored most quarters of the globe, except for those occupied by perpetual snow or polar ice. She has wondered far and wide...and has studied humanity of all shades and colours in its natural environment…with her the passion for travel is so strong that she finds it impossible to refrain from wandering".

Caddick was the first female member of the West Bromwich Education Committee, and one of the first governors of the University of Birmingham.

She died in 1927, in her eighties.

== Legacy ==
At the end of her life, Caddick presented her diaries to the Birmingham Central Library, and 12 volumes are now in the Library of Birmingham. These are the main source of information available on Caddick. Her typed diaries are also accompanied by hundreds of photos she bought or commissioned, which makes them an important record of the places she visited.

Caddick helped to set up the Oak House, West Bromwich, as a museum, mainly to house her collection, only some of which is still on display there. In the 1950s, Oak House Museum was re-imagined as a historic house, and Caddick's collection was moved to Wednesbury Museum and Art Gallery, where it was on permanent display until the 1990s. Many articles from her collection of ethnographic articles are now in the Sandwell Museum, West Bromwich. Artifacts include a stuffed Bengal tiger, the head of an Egyptian mummy, and embroidered costumes from Palestine.

Caddick is included in Not Just Bonnets and Bustles: Victorian Women Travellers in Africa, edited by Yvonne Barlow and published in 2008.
