= Andrew Swaby =

Jamaican politician

His Worship the Mayor Andrew Swaby

Mayor of Kingston
- Incumbent
- Assumed office 12 March 2024
- Deputy: Delroy Williams
- Preceded by: Delroy Williams

Deputy Mayor of Kingston
- In office 2012–2016

Personal details
- Born: December 15, 1971 (age 54) Black River, St. Elizabeth, Jamaica
- Party: People's National Party
- Spouse: Nicholette Swaby
- Children: 3
- Education: University of the West Indies Bsc; Caribbean Maritime University

Andrew Anthony Swaby (born December 15, 1971), is a Jamaican politician who currently as mayor of Kingston since 2024.

He has been an elected Councillor/representative for the past 26 years; he holds a BSc in Business Administration & a Masters in Logistics & Supply-Chain Management.

== Early life ==
Swaby was born on 15 December 1971 in Black River, St. Elizabeth. He attended Munro College and the University of the West Indies.

== Political career ==
Before ascending to the mayoralty in 2024, Swaby spent over 25 years in public service.

- Entry into Politics: He entered representational politics in 1998 as the Councillor for the Vineyard Town division.
- Local Leadership: He served as the Deputy Mayor of Kingston between 2012 and 2016 under then-Mayor Dr. Angela Brown Burke.
- Civic Roles: He is a long-standing Justice of the Peace (JP), a role he maintained throughout his political career.

== Personal life ==
He is married to Nicholette Swaby and he has 3 daughters.

Political offices
Preceded by Delroy Williams	Mayor of Kingston, Jamaica; 2024–present	Incumbent
