= Stanislaus Hoga =

Hebrew translator

Stanislaus Hoga (Polish: Stanisław Hoga, surname also as Hoge) born Ezekiel Hoga (1791–1860) was a Hebrew translator, a Jewish convert to Christianity.

== Life ==
Hoga was born into a Hasidic family in the Lublin area, then and for a few years in Poland. From Kuzmir (Kazimierz Dolny), he was the son of Yehuda Aryeh Leib, named Yehezkel; his father was the Rabbi there, and a follower of the Lublin Rebbe Jacob Isaac Hurwitz. After rabbinic education, support from Adam Kazimierz Czartoryski made it possible for him to study in Puławy. He became an interpreter for Napoleon's forces in the period 1807 to 1809.

After the war Hoga lived in Warsaw (then part of the Russian Empire). He acted from 1816 as assistant to the Jewish censor Adam Chalmelewski. He was himself appointed to the Jewish Censor Committee in 1818. After that he worked for Luigi Chiarini, of Warsaw University, and became his deputy. Under pressure to be baptised a Christian, he converted in the years after 1822, when he had begun to publish in Hebrew and on Jewish tradition. At this point he dropped his Jewish forename, in favour of the Christian name Stanislaus. By then he had left the Jewish censor post, and was engaged in Polish-Hebrew translation.

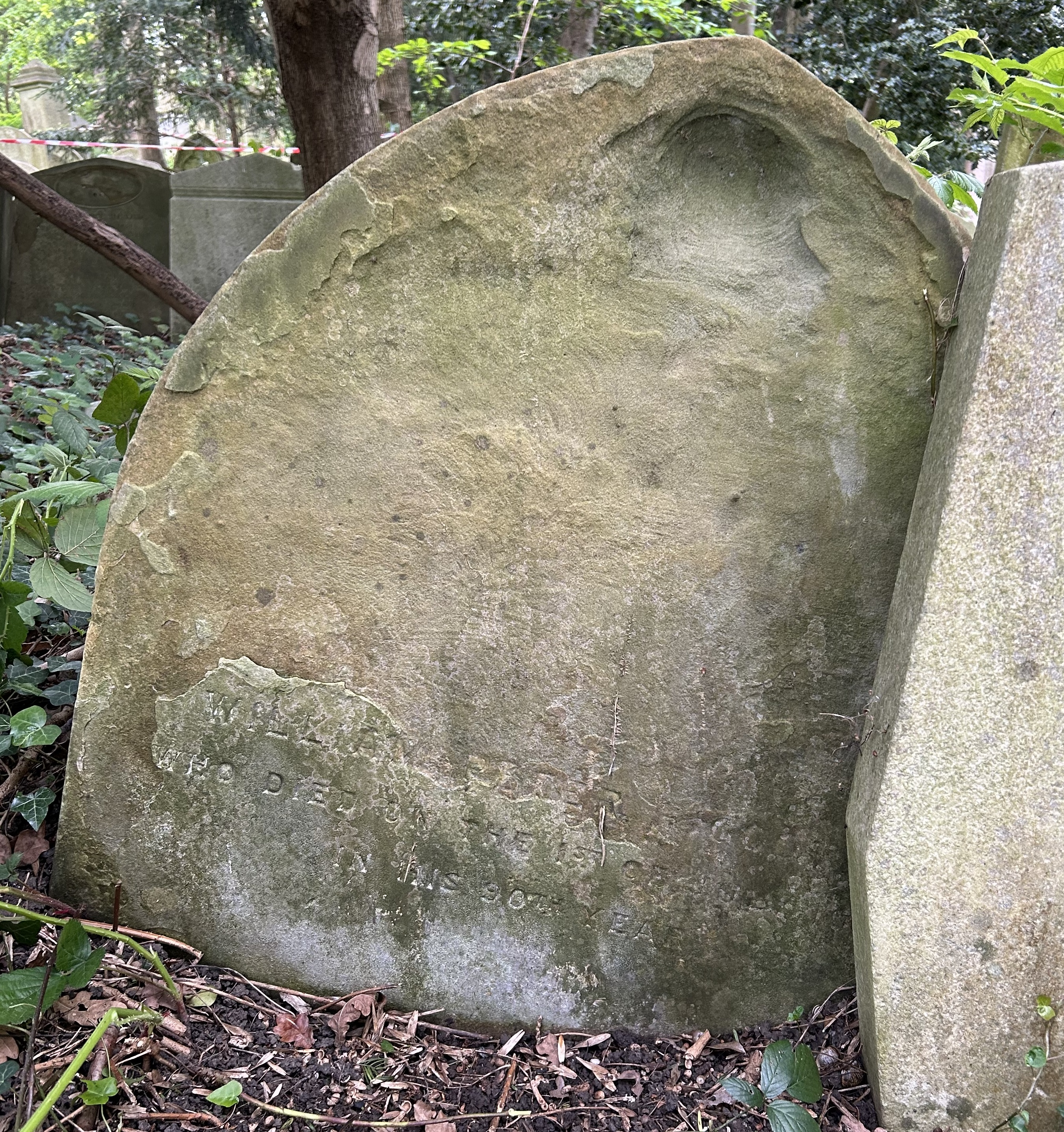
Grave of Stanislaus Hoga in Highgate Cemetery

Despite his apostate standing, Hoga defended Hasidism against state investigation in 1824. The authorities had been alarmed by an inquiry in 1823 into Hasidism in Płock, and the Committee for Religious Affairs was asked for a report. Input to it from Jacob Tugenhold and Hoga helped the conclusions to tend to moderation, Tugenhold being another of the Jewish censorship personnel. On 3 August 1824 Hoga defended Hasidism in a public disputation.

In Warsaw Hoga met Alexander McCaul of the London Society for Promoting Christianity among the Jews (LSPCJ). With McCaul's encouragement he went to London, and by 1838 he participated in a translation into Hebrew of the New Testament.

In later life Hoga took on literary work. He died at 96 Charlotte Street, London, and was buried in Highgate Cemetery.

== Views ==
The Controversy of Zion (1844) was Hoga's intervention in the debate around the methods of the LSPCJ. His view was that Jews, as Christian converts, should retain the traditions of Jewish law. He expanded what he found in the writings of John Oxlee to the same effect, and allied himself with the views of Charlotte Elizabeth Tonna; similar sentiments went back to Joseph Priestley and Thomas Witherby. After a number of years the LSPCJ found his critical attitude unacceptable, and they parted company in 1849, by which time he was writing in a hostile fashion in periodicals. Moses Margoliouth then followed Hoga with public criticism of the LSPCJ and Anglicans.

== Works ==
Hoga wrote:

- (in Polish) Tu chazy czyli Rozmowa o Żydach (1830), dialogue
- Songs of Zion, a selection of English and German hymns translated into Hebrew (1834; 2d ed., with additions, 1842).
- In Hebrew, Śefat Briṭanya: A Grammar of the English Language for the Use of Hebrews (London, 1840), and The Controversy of Zion: a Meditation on Judaism and Christianity (1845).
- In Hebrew translation, Pilgrim's Progress (London, 1844; 2d ed., 1851–52), and Alexander McCaul's Old Paths (1839).

== Notes ==
Attribution
