= William Caddick =

English painter

- Born: 1719; Liverpool
- Died: 29 December 1794 (aged 74–75)
- Occupations: Portrait artist and limner

William Caddick (1719 – 29 December 1794) was a Liverpool portrait artist and limner.

== Personal life ==
William Caddick was reportedly well acquainted with Richard Wright and George Stubbs, both slightly his junior.

From 1766 William, the artist, lived in Old Hall Street (his house was in the part known as North Walk), and he probably died there in 1794. He married Eliza, or Elizabeth, Wood of Burslem, a member of the noted family of potters. She was born on 11 June 1724, and died on 17 September 1795.

They had two sons, William Caddick, junior, and Richard. Richard was born about 1750, perhaps earlier; William was probably younger. Both became painters. William Caddick is therefore sometimes referred to as Caddick senior but references and works relating to him and both junior sons may be easily confused. In 1780 W. Caddick, junior (North Walk, Liverpool), made the family's sole appearance at the 1780 Royal Academy exhibition, with a 'Portrait in the character of Circe'. As W. Caddick, senior, was then sixty-one years of age, and his father had been dead many years, this picture is assumed to have been by his son. This panel portrait, restored in 2001, is believed to be of Stubbs' mistress, Mary Spencer. Irrespective of which Caddick painted it, it provides further evidence that the Caddick family remained acquainted with Stubbs after the latter moved to London.

== Career ==
Caddick was the sole artist listed in the first Street Directory of Liverpool, published in 1760. The initial spelling Caddock was used until the editions of 1774. Caddick, described as the 'elder statesman of Liverpool Artists', was offered and accepted the Presidency of the Liverpool Society of Artists.

== Works ==
Few of Caddick's attributed surviving works are known. The Walker Art Gallery in Liverpool, holds four. One of these is a portrait, painted in 1747, of Aaron Wood, his brother-in-law, a worthy of whom it is recorded that ' he was never heard [or known] to swear, chew tobacco, take snuff, or whistle or sing in his life, and was considered the most lively, pleasant, and merriest man in the county' though Dibdin observes that "W. Caddick has not quite succeeded in telling us all this with his brush".

== Bibliography ==
- Egerton, Judy (2007). George Stubbs, Painter: Catalogue Raisonné. Yale University Press. ISBN 9780300125092.
