= Hector Mitchell (politician) =

Politician in Jamaica

Hector Mitchell was an alderman, magistrate in Kingston and elected to the House of Assembly of Jamaica in 1820.

With the mayor of Kingston Joseph Barnes, Mitchell persecuted two Jamaican free men of colour and had them deported from the island for an imaginary conspiracy against the government. The case was discussed in the British House of Commons. Records relating to Mitchell's activities in Jamaica are held by the British National Archives.
