= Ernest Grafford Peart =

Jamaican politician and diplomat

Minister of Works of Jamaica
- In office 1976–1978

High Commission of Jamaica, London of Jamaica to United Kingdom
- In office September 10, 1978 – April 24, 1981
- Preceded by: Arthur Wint
- Succeeded by: 20. November 1981: Herbert Samuel Walker (born 1924, St. Mary, Jamaica)

Personal details
- Born: May 11, 1918
- Died: April 24, 1981 (aged 62)
- Spouse(s): m. October 25, 1947, Dorothy Searing of London (born 1905 Lincolnshire, Dip. in Sociology)
- Children: Tricia Peart, Dean Peart, Christine Peart-Steele, Michael Peart,
- Parents: Cyril Peart (father); Sarah Peart (mother)
- Education: New Green Primary School, Jamaica, Manchester High School, Jamaica, Royal Air Force College Cranwell Letchworth Tech High School UK, RAF Yatesbury No 9 Radar School, UK.

Ernest Grafford Peart (May 11, 1918 – April 24, 1981) was a Jamaican politician and diplomat.

From 1959 to 1971 he was Member of the Parliament of Jamaica for the People's National Party, Western Manchester Parish constituency. In 1962 he was elected with 8561 votes. While an MP, he sat on the Parliamentary Public Accounts Committee.

In 1972 he was appointed Minister of Labour, followed by Minister of Works from 1976 to 1978. From September 10, 1978 to April 24, 1981 he was High Commissioner (Commonwealth) in London.
