= Marie Atkins =

Jamaican mayor of Kingston, Jamaica

Marie Atkins was mayor of the Kingston and Saint Andrew Corporation (KSAC) from 1989 to 2003. Atkins was the third female mayor for Kingston & St. Andrew, Jamaica, and is the longest-serving mayor to date for Kingston & St. Andrew. She is the first Jamaican to become the president of the World Conference of Mayors. Atkins died at the age of 88 on 28 December 2008.

| Preceded by Ralph Brown (politician) | Mayor of Kingston and Saint Andrew Corporation; 1992–2003 | Succeeded by Desmond McKenzie |
