= Elias Hutter =

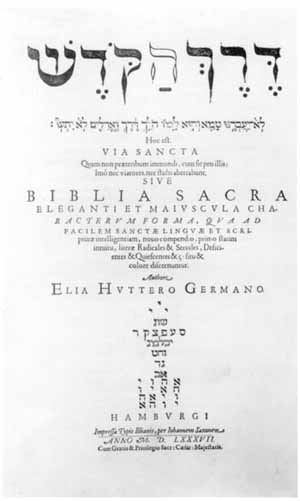

Elias Hutter (Gorlitz or Ulm 1553-Nuremberg or Frankfurt, c.1605) was a German Hebraist.

He studied in Strassburg, studied Asian languages at the Lutheran University in Jena, and was professor of Hebrew at Leipzig University. His Opus Quadripartitum, or Bible in Hebrew, Greek, Latin, and German, was published by David Wolter at Hamburg in 1596.

== Works ==
- Old Testament Via Sancta, sive Biblia sacra Hebraea Veteris Testamenti with an appendix of Psalm 117 in 30 languages
- Opus Quadripartitum
- Expanded edition - with the Old Testament as far as the Book of Ruth in six languages, giving in five columns the Chaldee, Hebrew, Greek, Latin, and German versions, while the sixth column presents either the Low German, French, Italian, or Slavic text.
- New Testament Polyglot (at times referred to as the Nuremberg Polyglot) in two volumes (Gospels plus Acts, Epistles plus Revelation), 1599, Nuremberg, "Novum Testamentum Dn̄i: Nr̄i: Iesu Christi, Syriacè, Ebraicè, Græcè, Latinè, Germanicè, Bohemicè, Italicè, Hispanicè, Gallicè, Anglicè, Danicè, Polonicè." These volumes contain the NT in twelve languages [Syriac, Hebrew, Greek, Latin, German, Czech, Italian, Spanish, French, English, Danish, Polish] presented in two columns of 6 languages across. The English translation Hutter cites appears to be the Geneva translation; the Hebrew is Hutter's original translation and the German appears to be Luther's translation.
- Various editions of the Nuremberg Polyglot are known, including a lectionary (1601) and Matthew & Mark in a single volume (1599)
- Hutter created an edition of the Hebrew Old Testament called Bibliorum Hebraicorum around 1587.
