= Thomas L. Yates =

Politician in Jamaica

Thomas Legall (or Legal) Yates was elected to the House of Assembly of Jamaica in 1820 for the parish of Port Royal.

It is unclear whether this Thomas Yates is the merchant of Kingston (1784–1835), or his uncle, also Thomas Legall Yates (1752–1832).

Thomas Legal Yates appears as the purser on HMS Galatea (1776) from 1785 to 1789.
