= William Greenfield (philologist) =

English philologist

William Greenfield (1 April 1799 – 5 November 1831) was an English philologist.

Greenfield was born in London on 1 April 1799. His father, William Greenfield, a native of Haddington, attended Well Street Chapel, London, then under the ministry of Alexander Waugh. He joined a missionary voyage in the ship Duff, and was accidentally drowned when his son was two years old. In the spring of 1802 Greenfield was taken by his mother to Jedburgh. In the summer of 1810 they returned to London, and Greenfield resided for some time with his two maternal uncles, who gave him instruction. They were men of business who studied languages in order to understand learned quotations, and they taught him.

In October 1812 Greenfield was apprenticed to a bookbinder named Rennie. A Jew employed in his master's house, and a reader of the law in the synagogue, taught him Hebrew gratuitously. At sixteen Greenfield began to teach in the Fitzroy Sabbath School, of which his master was a conductor. At seventeen he became a member of Well Street Chapel, and a close friend of the minister, Dr. Waugh.

In 1824 he left business to devote himself to languages and biblical criticism. In 1827 he published The Comprehensive Bible … with … a general introduction … Notes, &c. The book, though fiercely attacked as heterodox by the 'Record' and a Dr. Henderson, became very popular, especially among Unitarians. An abridgment was afterwards published as The Pillar of Divine Truth immoveably fixed on the foundation of the Apostles and Prophets. … The whole of the arguments and illustrations drawn from the pages of the Comprehensive Bible, by …[W. Greenfield], 8vo, London, 1831. Greenfield's valuable Defence of the Serampore Mahratta Version of the New Testament (in reply to the Asiatic Journal for September, 1829), 8vo, London, 1830, commended him to the notice of the British and Foreign Bible Society, by whom he was engaged, about April of that year, as superintendent of the editorial department. He had no previous knowledge of the Mahratta and other languages referred to in the pamphlet, which, it is said, was written within five weeks of his taking up the subject. He followed it up by A Defence of the Surinam Negro-English Version of the New Testament …, 1830 (in reply to the Edinburgh Christian Instructor).

While nineteen months in the society's service Greenfield wrote upon twelve European, five Asiatic, one African, and three American languages; and acquired considerable knowledge of Peruvian, Surinam Creole, Chippeway, and Berber. His last undertaking for the society was the revision of the Modern Greek Psalter as it went through the press. He also projected a grammar in thirty languages, but in the midst of his labours he was struck down by brain fever, dying at Islington on 5 November 1831. He left a widow and five children, on whose behalf a subscription was opened His portrait by Hayter was engraved by Holl. Greenfield was a member of the Royal Asiatic Society.

== Works ==
- The book of Genesis in English-Hebrew … with notes, &c., by ... [W. Greenfield], 8vo, London, 1828; & 8vo, London, 1831.
- New Testament, Greek, 16mo, London, 1829.
- The Polymicrian Greek Lexicon to the New Testament, &c., 16mo, London, 1829 (new edition as A Greek-English Lexicon to the New Testament, revised by T. S. Green, 8vo, London, 1849; other editions in 1870 and 1885).
- Novi Testamenti Græci Ταμείον,’ … Ex opera E. Schmidii … depromptum a Gulielmo Greenfield, Greek, 16mo, London, 1830.
- A Defence of the Surinam Negro-English Version of the New Testament, 1830
- New Testament, Greek and Hebrew, translated into Hebrew by W. Greenfield, 8vo, London, 1831 (with the Hebrew translation only, 16mo, London [1831]). The Hebrew version was also included in Samuel Lee's Biblia Sacra Polyglotta, fol. London, 1831.
