= Eliyahu Soloveitchik =

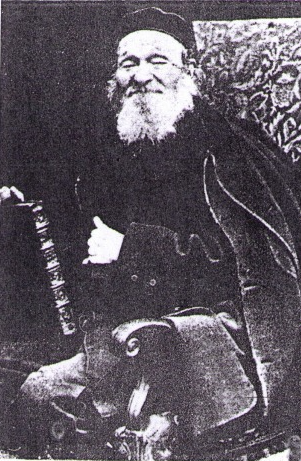

Eliyahu (Elijah, Elias, or Elie) Zevi Soloveitchik (Soloweyczyk) (Hebrew: אליהו סולובייצ'יק; c. 1805–1881) was a Lithuanian rabbi, author and translator from Slutsk. Soloveitchik was a grandson of Rabbi Chaim Volozhin (b. 1749) and the uncle of Rabbi Yosef Dov Soloveitchik, the Beis Halevi (b. 1820).

In 1870 he published a Hebrew commentary on the Gospel of Matthew called Kol Kore (The Calling Voice) which was translated into French, German and English as The Bible, the Talmud and the Gospel. The work followed the approach of Jacob Emden and sought to explain the Talmud to Christians and the Gospel to Jews and to demonstrate the common grounds of belief.

He also published a commentary on the Yad Hachazakah of Maimonides. His English translation of the Mishneh Torah was completed in 1857 and published in England in 1863 by Thomas William Nicholson of London. In his later life he became blind.

Eliyahu Zevi Soloveitchik was the father of Simchah Ha-Levi Soloveitchik (c. 1830-1921), who emigrated to Jerusalem where he was called "The Londoner." His son was a Jerusalem community worker and pharmacist known as Zalman Yoseph Soloveitchik (b. 1874) who was the father of Yitzchak Leib (b. 1895) who emigrated to New York and changed the family name to Salovey; he was known for his work caring for the infirm and elderly of the community. His daughter Chaya Sarah married Rabbi Mordechai Yehoshua Kreuzer, one of the ancestors of the Kreuzer family. His son, Ronald (b. 1932), was a professor of chemical engineering at the University of Southern California in Los Angeles and at the Technion in Haifa. Ronald is the father of Peter Salovey (b. 1958), who became President of Yale University in 2013 and is the Chris Argyris Professor of Psychology there.

== English edition ==
- The Bible, the Talmud, and the New Testament: Elijah Zvi Soloveitchik's Commentary to the Gospels (Jewish Culture and Contexts), edited Shaul Magid, translator Jordan Gayle Levy, with Peter Salovey. Philadelphia: University of Pennsylvania Press, 2019. ISBN 9780812250992
