= Thomas Yeates (orientalist) =

English linguist

Thomas Yeates (1768–1869) was a British oriental linguist, translator, and historian. He is best known for transcribing Indian manuscripts into English, as well as the New Testament into Biblical Hebrew.

== Life ==
He was the son of John Yeates, a turner, of Snow Hill, London, where he was born on 9 October 1768. He was at first apprenticed to his father, but, showing no taste for the trade, was allowed to pursue studies in Latin and Hebrew. At the age of fourteen he appears to have been employed as secretary to the Society for Promoting Constitutional Information, a radical association which numbered Sir William Jones (1746–1794) among its members, but he can have held this post only a short time.

Following a plan which he had formed of rendering the New Testament into Biblical Hebrew, he got into communication with Joseph White, who, shortly after his appointment to the professorship of Hebrew at Oxford, got Yeates a bible clerkship at All Souls' College, Oxford; he matriculated there on 22 May 1802, but never graduated. Though he worked for many years at this translation, and received encouragement from the continent as well as in England, the only portion of it ever published was a specimen which appeared in the third annual report of the London Jews' Society.

From about 1808 to 1815 Yeates was employed by Claudius Buchanan to catalogue and describe his oriental manuscripts brought from India; and for much of this period he lived in Cambridge, where the University Press published (1812) his 'Collation of an India Copy of the Pentateuch;' the copies of this work were presented by the press to Yeates. He also, through Buchanan, obtained employment from the Bible Society, and superintended their editions of the Æthiopic Psalter and the Syriac New Testament.

After Buchanan's death he was helped by Thomas Burgess, bishop of St. David's, who procured for him the secretaryship of the Royal Society of Literature, and in 1823 the post of assistant in the printed book department of the British Museum, which he retained until his death.

He died on 7 October 1839.

== Works ==
In 1818 he published a work called 'Indian Church History,' compiled chiefly from Assemani and the reports of Buchanan and Kerr, and containing an account of the Christian churches in the East, with an ultra-conservative history of their origin. The same year he produced a 'Variation Chart of all the Navigable Oceans and Seas between latitude 60 degrees N. and S. from Documents, and delineated on a new plan;' and in 1819 a Syriac grammar, the first that ever appeared in English. He was also employed by the publishers of Caleb Ashworth's 'Hebrew Grammar' to revise the third and subsequent editions. In 1830 he published 'Remarks on the Bible Chronology, being an Essay towards reconciling the same with the Histories of the Eastern Nations;' in 1833 'A Dissertation on the Antiquity of the Pyramids;' and in 1835 'Remarks on the History of Ancient Egypt.' His astronomical publications involved him in financial difficulties, which the Literary Fund helped him to meet.

=== External links ===
- Catalogue of Oriental manuscripts and printed books
