= J.-M. Paul Bauchet =

Jean-Marie Paul Bauchet (Orléans, 1 May 1900 - after 1974 ) was a French Carmelite (of the Congregation of the Blessed Sacrament), translator and Hebraist. Bauchet re-edited the Hebrew New Testament of Franz Delitzsch. After studying in France and Iraq, he moved to Jerusalem in 1941. In Jerusalem, he worked on translating Christian texts into Hebrew. He received his doctorate from the Hebrew University of Jerusalem in 1949. In 1974 he translated the entire New Testament into Hebrew.

== Works ==
- various works in Hebrew; inc. The Life of St. Dominic
- Paul Bauchet, 'Transcription and Translation of a Psalm from Sukenik's Dead Sea scroll', CBQ 12 (1950), 331–5. 7.
