= Joseph Barnes (merchant) =

Jamaican merchant and slave-owner

Joseph Barnes (ca 1765 - 6 May 1829) was a merchant and slave-owner in Jamaica. He was elected to the House of Assembly of Jamaica in 1820.

Barnes was living in Jamaica by 1808 and acquired Cumberland Penn, Portmore, Saint Catherine in 1809.
