= Desmond McKenzie =

Jamaican politician

The Honourable Desmond McKenzie OJ CD JP MP

Minister of Local Government and Community Development
- Incumbent
- Assumed office 7 March 2016
- Prime Minister: Andrew Holness

Mayor of Kingston, Jamaica
- In office 2003–2012
- Preceded by: Marie Atkins
- Succeeded by: Angela Brown-Burke

Member of the Jamaican Senate
- In office 2002–2003

Member of Parliament for Kingston Western
- Incumbent
- Assumed office 2011

Personal details
- Born: 1 December 1952 (age 73) Jamaica
- Party: Jamaica Labour Party
- Spouse: Marcia McKenzie
- Children: 5

Desmond Anthony Augustus McKenzie, OJ, CD, JP (born 1 December 1952) is a Jamaican politician and former mayor of the Kingston and Saint Andrew Corporation (KSAC), who held office between July 2003 and January 2012, when he was elected as the Member of Parliament for the constituency of Kingston Western. He currently serves as the Jamaica Labour Party spokesman for urban renewal, rural development and local government.

In earlier years, McKenzie, served as Junior Spokesman of the Opposition in the Senate of Jamaica in 2002 to 2003. He was a councillor at Denham Town from 1977 to 1984 and at Tivoli Gardens from 1990 to 2011.

== Career ==
Desmond McKenzie gained national attention when he became the youngest Jamaican vested with the title of Mayor of Kingston, the largest capital city in the English-speaking Caribbean. It was a position he held until he was elected as Member of Parliament for the Kingston Western Constituency in the 2011 general election.

He also held positions as a former President of the Jamaica Labour Party's youth arm, Young Jamaica; Jamaica's representative on the Caribbean and the International Youth Council; and served as vice president of the World Conference of Mayors.

McKenzie is regarded as one of Jamaica's most active mayors, noted for his direct attitude towards stopping crime. When appointed, he was the youngest serving mayor in KSAC's history.

== Personal life ==
Minister McKenzie is married to Marcia with three sons and two daughters. He lists his hobbies as collecting, selecting and playing music and cricket.

== Awards and recognition ==
Minister McKenzie was awarded the Order of Distinction in the Commander Class in 2008. He was also recognized by Rotary International with the Paul Harris Award and became CVM Television's Newsmaker of the Year in 2004. In 2025, he was awarded the Order of Jamaica.
