= List of female members of the House of Representatives of Jamaica =

This is a list of women that have been elected as members of parliament (MPs) to the House of Representatives of Jamaica from 1944 to present.

#	Name	Party	Year first elected	Year left office
1	Iris Collins	JLP	1944	1949
2	Rose Leon	JLP	1949	1976
3	Iris King	PNP	1959	1967
4	Enid Bennett	JLP	1967	1997
5	Esme Grant	JLP	1967	1972
6	Mavis Gilmour	JLP	1976	1989
7	Carmen McGregor	PNP	1976	1980
8	Portia Simpson-Miller	PNP	1976	2017
9	Violet Thompson	PNP	1976	1980
10	Joan Gordon-Webley	JLP	1980	1989
11	Princess Lawes	JLP	1980	1989
12	Euphemia Williams	JLP	1980	1989
13	Joan Chung	JLP	1983	1989
14	Hyacinth Knight	JLP	1983	1989
15	Patricia Pink	JLP	1983	1989
16	Violet Neilson	PNP	1989	2002
17	Olivia Grange	JLP	1993	
18	Karlene Kirlew-Robertson	PNP	1993	1997
19	Phyllis Mitchell	PNP	1993	2002
20	Heather Robinson	PNP	1993	1997
21	Marjorie Taylor	PNP	1993	1997
22	Alethia Barker	PNP	1997	2002
23	Doreen Chen	PNP	1997	2002
24	Jennifer Edwards	PNP	1997	2002
25	Sharon Hay-Webster	PNP	1997	2011
26	Shahine Robinson	JLP	2001	2020
27	Maxine Henry-Wilson	PNP	2002	2011
28	Aloun Ndombet-Assamba	PNP	2002	2007
29	Verna Parchment	JLP	2002	2007
30	Marisa Dalrymple-Philibert	JLP	2007	
31	Lisa Hanna	PNP	2007	
32	Denise Daley	PNP	2011	
33	Sharon Ffolkes-Abrahams	PNP	2011	2016
34	Natalie Neita-Headley	JLP	2011	
35	Juliet Cuthbert-Flynn	JLP	2016	
36	Juliet Holness	JLP	2016	
37	Marlene Malahoo Forte	JLP	2016	
38	Fayval Williams	JLP	2016	
39	Angela Brown-Burke	PNP	2017	
40	Ann-Marie Vaz	JLP	2019	
41	Michelle Charles	JLP	2020	
42	Rhoda Moy-Crawford	JLP	2020	
43	Tamika Davis	JLP	2020	
44	Tova Hamilton	JLP	2020	
45	Krystal Lee	JLP	2020	
46	Kerensia Morrison	JLP	2020	
47	Marsha Smith	JLP	2020	

== See also ==
- Women in the House of Representatives of Jamaica
