= Women in the House of Representatives of Jamaica =

Jamaica is the first English-speaking country in the Caribbean to achieve universal adult suffrage and grant women the right to be elected to Parliament. Between 1944 and 2020, a total of 47 women have been elected as members of the House of Representatives. As of September 2020 there are 18 women in the House of Representatives, the highest ever. This is a new all-time high at 29% and is the first time that female representation in the House of Representatives stands at more than a quarter of the total membership.

== Universal Adult Suffrage ==
Iris Collins was the first woman elected to Parliament (1944).

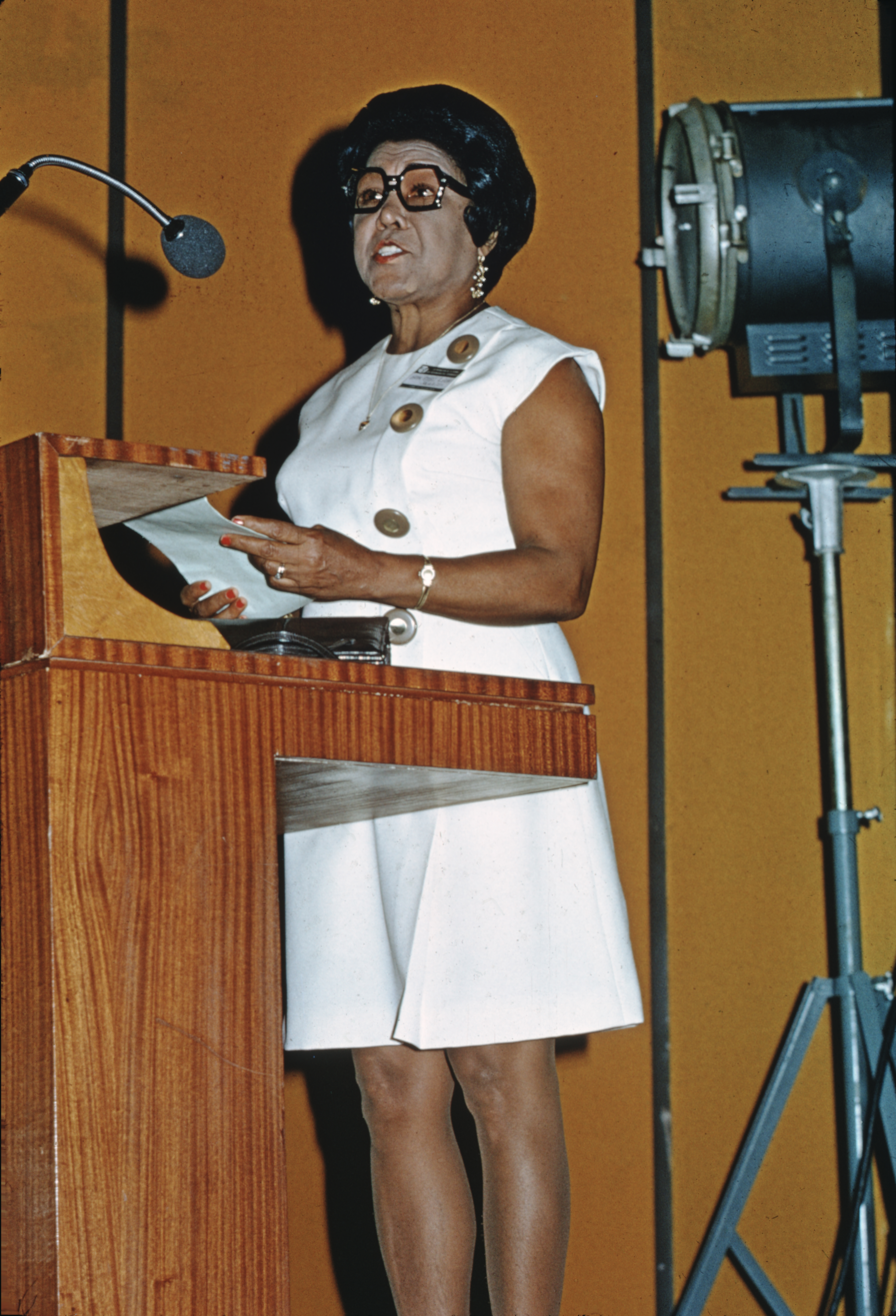
Rose Leon was the first woman cabinet member (1953).

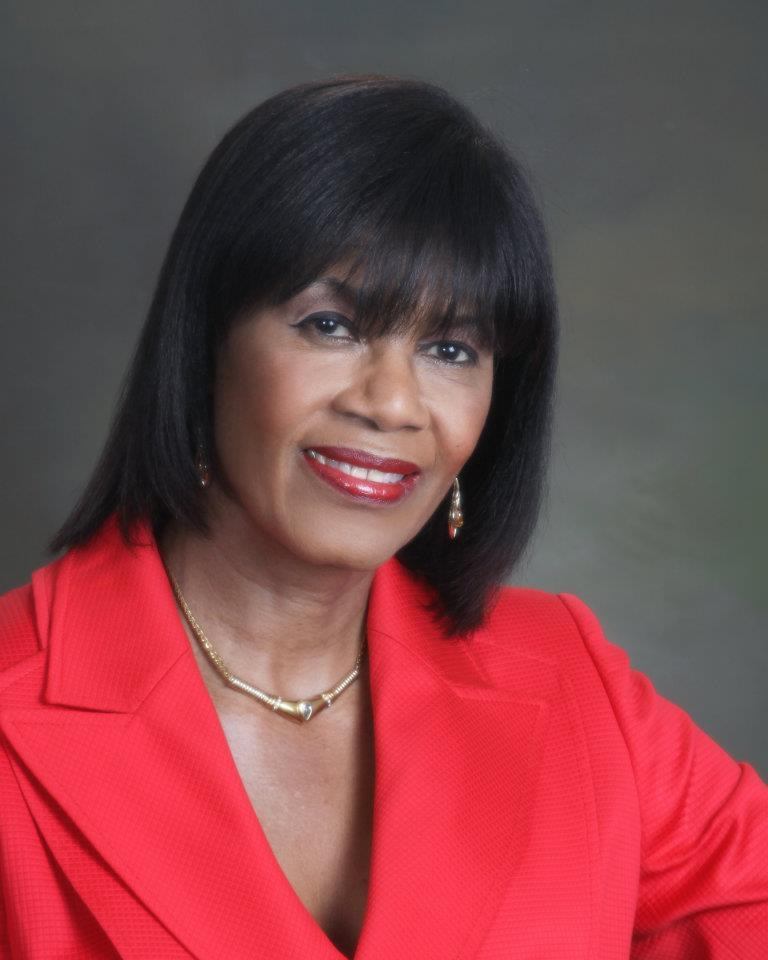
Portia Simpson-Miller is Jamaica's first woman prime minister (2006-2007) and (2011-2016).

Women in Jamaica gained the right to vote in 1919, but that right was subject to property and income requirements. By 1917 there was a branch of the Women's Citizens League was established.

The country was granted full adult suffrage on November 20, 1944. The new system extended voting rights to adults irrespective of their race, sex, or social class.

On December 12 of the same year, Jamaica became only the third state in the British Empire to conduct elections on the basis of universal adult suffrage, preceded only by New Zealand (1893) and the United Kingdom (1918). The election was won by the Jamaica Labour Party (JLP), which claimed 22 seats; the People’s National Party (PNP) and the Independents won five seats each. Of the 32 new members of the Assembly, there was only one woman, Iris Collins, representing the JLP.

Over the period 1944 to 1976, only 5 women had been elected to the House of Representatives: Iris Collins, Rose Leon, Iris King, Enid Bennett, and Esme Grant.

== Landmarks and records ==
=== Political firsts for women in the House of Representatives ===
- 1944: Women able to stand for Parliament.
- 1944: First woman elected to Parliament – Iris Collins, (JLP).
- 1948: First woman to chair a national political party, Rose Leon (JLP)
- 1953: First woman Cabinet minister – Rose Leon, (JLP) – minister of health and social welfare.
- 1955: First woman reelected to Parliament – Rose Leon, (JLP)
- 1976: First woman to represent more than one constituency – Enid Bennett (JLP).
- 1976: First woman to cross the floor – Rose Leon (from JLP to PNP).
- 1976: First woman to be reelected for a third term – Enid Bennett (JLP), Rose Leon (PNP).
- 1980: First woman to be reelected for a fourth term – Enid Bennett (JLP).
- 1983: First woman to be reelected for a fifth term – Enid Bennett (JLP).
- 1989: First woman to be reelected for a sixth term – Enid Bennett (JLP).
- 1994: First woman general secretary of a major political party – Maxine Henry-Wilson (PNP).
- 1997: First woman speaker of the House of Representatives – Violet Neilson (PNP).
- 2005: First woman leader of a major political party – Portia Simpson-Miller (PNP).
- 2006: First woman prime minister – Portia Simpson-Miller.
- 2007: First woman leader of the opposition – Portia Simpson-Miller (PNP).
- 2007: First woman minister of justice – Dorothy Lightbourne (JLP).
- 2007: First woman attorney general – Dorothy Lightbourne (JLP).
- 2016: Proportion of women in the House of Representatives exceeds 15% for the first time.
- 2016: First woman foreign minister – Kamina Johnson-Smith (JLP)
- 2019: Proportion of women in the House of Representatives exceeds 20% for the first time.
- 2020: Proportion of women in the House of Representatives exceeds 25% for the first time.
- 2020: First woman to serve non-contiguous terms as Speaker of the House of Representatives – Marisa Dalrymple-Philibert (JLP).

=== Records ===
Portia Simpson-Miller is the longest serving female MP in the history of the House of Representatives. She was MP for Saint Andrew South Western from 1976 to 1983 and from 1989 to until her retirement from active politics in 2017. Enid Bennett was the longest continuously-serving female MP. She was MP for St. Catherine Central from 1967 to 1976 and represented St. Catherine West Central from 1976 to 1989. Olivia Grange is currently the longest-serving sitting female MP in Parliament.

Party	Name	Constituency	Year elected	Year left	Length of continuous term	Length of cumulative term
PNP	Portia Simpson-Miller	Saint Andrew South Western	1976	2017	28 years 5 months	35 years 5 months
JLP	Enid Bennett	St. Catherine Central & St. Catherine West Central	1967	1997	30 years 10 months	30 years 10 months
JLP	Olivia Grange	Kingston Central & St. Catherine Central	1993		29 years 2 months	29 years 2 months
JLP	Shahine Robinson	St. Ann North Eastern	2001	2020	19 years 2 months	19 years 2 months
JLP	Marisa Dalrymple-Philibert	Trelawny Southern	2007		14 years 8 months	14 years 8 months
PNP	Lisa Hanna	St. Ann South Eastern	2007	2025	14 years 8 months	18 years 0 months

== Historic representation ==
As of August 2020, there are 18 female MPs in the House of Representatives, 29% of the House. The number of female members from the Jamaica Labour Party is 14 out of 49 members, also 29%, a record for any political party, and also tied with the People's National Party (4 out of 14 members).

The previous record was after the 2016 election when 12 women (19%) was elected to parliament. With the resignation of Portia Simpson-Miller in 2017, this number was temporarily reduced to 11. After by-elections in 2017 and 2019, with the election of Angela Brown-Burke and Ann-Marie Vaz, respectively, the number of women in the House of Representatives rose to 13, thus exceeding 20% for the first time.

=== Women in the House of Representatives by election year and by party ===
View source data.

Election Year	Women total	JLP Women	PNP Women
2020	18 / 63 (29%)	14 / 49 (29%)	4 / 14 (29%)
2016	12 / 63 (19%)	8 / 32 (25%)	4 / 31 (13%)
2011	8 / 63 (13%)	4 / 21 (19%)	4 / 42 (10%)
2007	8 / 60 (13%)	4 / 33 (12%)	4 / 27 (15%)
2002	7 / 60 (12%)	3 / 26 (12%)	4 / 34 (12%)
1997	8 / 60 (13%)	1 / 10 (10%)	7 / 50 (14%)
1993	7 / 60 (12%)	2 / 8 (25%)	5 / 52 (10%)
1989	3 / 60 (5%)	1 / 15 (7%)	2 / 45 (4%)
1983	9 / 60 (15%)	9 / 60 (15%)	(uncontested)
1980	7 / 60 (12%)	6 / 51 (12%)	1 / 9 (11%)
1976	5 / 60 (8%)	2 / 13 (15%)	3 / 47 (6%)
1972	2 / 53 (4%)	1 / 16 (6%)	1 / 37 (3%)
1967	2 / 53 (4%)	2 / 33 (6%)	0 / 20 (0%)
1962	1 / 45 (2%)	1 / 26 (4%)	0 / 19 (0%)
1959	1 / 45 (2%)	0 / 16 (0%)	1 / 29 (3%)
1955	1 / 32 (3%)	1 / 14 (7%)	0 / 18 (0%)
1949	1 / 32 (3%)	1 / 17 (6%)	0 / 13 (0%)
1944	1 / 32 (3%)	1 / 22 (5%)	0 / 10 (0%)

== Women Speakers of the House of Representatives ==
Women Speakers 1944–present
1997	Violet Neilson (PNP)
2011	Marisa Dalrymple-Philibert (JLP)
2020	Marisa Dalrymple-Philibert (JLP)
2023	Juliet Holness (JLP)

== Women Attorneys-General ==
Attorneys-General 1962–present
2007	Dorothy Lightbourne (JLP)
2016	Marlene Malahoo Forte (JLP)

== Women in Cabinet ==
=== Current Female Cabinet members (JLP) ===
- Olivia Grange – Minister of Culture, Gender, Entertainment and Sport
- Kamina Johnson-Smith – Minister of Foreign Affairs and Foreign Trade (Senator)
- Fayval Williams – Minister of Finance & Public Service
- Dana Morris Dixon — Minister of Education, Skills, Youth & Information (Senator)

=== Female Cabinet members after 2016 (JLP) ===
- Olivia Grange – Minister of Sports, Culture, Entertainment and Gender Affairs
- Kamina Johnson-Smith – Minister of Foreign Affairs and Foreign Trade (Senator)
- Shahine Robinson – Minister of Labour and Social Security
- Fayval Williams – Minister of Science, Energy and Technology

Women Cabinet Ministers 1944–present
1953	Rose Leon (JLP)
1972	Phyllis MacPherson-Russell (PNP)
1980	Mavis Gilmour (JLP)
1989	Portia Simpson-Miller (PNP)
2000	Maxine Henry-Wilson (PNP)
2006	Aloun Ndombet-Assamba (PNP)
2007	Olivia Grange (JLP)
2007	Dorothy Lightbourne (JLP)
2012	Lisa Hanna (PNP)
2016	Kamina Johnson-Smith (JLP)
2016	Shahine Robinson (JLP)
2016	Fayval Williams (JLP)

== See also ==
- Parliament of Jamaica
- List of speakers of the House of Representatives of Jamaica
- Attorney General of Jamaica
- List of female members of the House of Representatives of Jamaica
- List of the first women holders of political offices in North America#Jamaica
- Women in positions of power
- Women in Parliaments Global Forum
- Women in government
