= Manchester Southern =

Parliamentary constituency of Jamaica

Manchester Southern is a parliamentary constituency represented in the House of Representatives of the Jamaican Parliament. It elects one Member of Parliament MP by the first past the post system of election. The constituency was one of the original 32 parliamentary seats.

== Members of Parliament ==
=== 1944 to 1959 ===
Election	Member	Party
1944	Wendell Benjamin	People's National Party
1949	Lawton Bloomfield	Jamaica Labour Party
1955	Winston Jones	People's National Party
1959	Constituency abolished	

=== 1967 to present ===
Election	Member	Party
1967	Arthur Williams	Jamaica Labour Party
1972	Douglas Manley	People's National Party
1974 (court order)	Arthur Williams	Jamaica Labour Party
1976	Douglas Manley	People's National Party
1980	Arthur Williams	Jamaica Labour Party
1983	Lloyd Bent	Jamaica Labour Party
1989	Douglas Manley	People's National Party
1993	Michael Peart	People's National Party
1997	Michael Peart	People's National Party
2002	Michael Peart	People's National Party
2007	Michael Peart	People's National Party
2011	Michael Peart	People's National Party
2016	Michael Stewart	People's National Party
2020	Robert Chin	Jamaica Labour Party

== Constituency Boundary ==
Source:
