= Trelawny Northern =

Jamaican parliamentary constituency

- constituency for the Parliament of Jamaica
- Parish: Trelawny
- County: Cornwall
- Population: 48,597 (2011 census)
- Electorate: 38,235 (2020)
- Major settlements: Falmouth, Wakefield, Clark's Town, Duncans

Current constituency
- Created: 1944
- Party: Jamaica Labour Party
- Member of Parliament: Tova Hamilton
- Electoral divisions: Falmouth, Martha Brae, Duncans, Wakefield, Sherwood Content
- Returning officer: Ivanhoe Gordon
- Constituency number: 27

Trelawny Northern is a parliamentary constituency represented in the House of Representatives of the Jamaican Parliament. It elects one Member of Parliament (MP) by the first past the post system of election. It was one of the 32 constituencies fixed in the new constitution granted to Jamaica in 1944. The constituency has featured in all 16 contested Parliamentary General Elections from 1944 to 2016. The current MP is Tova Hamilton, representing the Jamaica Labour Party, who has been in office since the 2020 general election.

== Boundaries ==
The constituency covers five of the nine electoral divisions in the parish of Trelawny – Falmouth and Martha Brae to the north, Duncans to the east, Wakefield to the west, and Sherwood Content to the south.

== Demographics ==
According to the Jamaica Population Census of 2011, the number of persons living in the constituency was 48,597, while the number of registered voters was 33,029. As of the 2020 general election, the number of registered electors in the constituency was 38,235. This represents a 5.6% increase over the 36,195 voters registered for the 2016 general election.

Voter Distribution by Electoral Division
Electoral Division	Number of Polling Divisions	Number of electors
Duncans	29	8,486
Falmouth	20	6,729
Martha Brae	21	6,902
Sherwood Content	25	7,203
Wakefield	29	8,915
Grand total	124	38,235

== History ==
=== 1944-1962 ===
Trelawny Northern is one of the 32 constituencies fixed in the new constitution granted to Jamaica in 1944. The first Member of Parliament from the constituency was Clement Aitcheson of the Jamaica Labour Party (JLP). In the 1944 general elections, he polled 2,759 votes to defeat independent candidates John Maxwell (1,848), Luther Wakeland (619), and Alfred McDonald (277). Aitcheson served one term, during which he was elected the second Speaker of the House of Representatives in 1946. In 1949, he was succeeded by Allan Douglas of the JLP, who polled 4,826 votes for victory over the People’s National Party's (PNP) Luther Wakeland (2,948), and two independent candidates – Victor Gentles, and Cedric Titus, who received 1,457 and 612 votes, respectively. Douglas went on to serve two terms and in 1953 was appointed Jamaica's first minister of trade and industry in the Alexander Bustamante-led administration. Douglas was succeeded by Ellison Wakeland of the JLP who won the seat in the 1959 general election, polling 5,856 votes to the PNP's Cedric Titus (5,677).

=== 1962-1972 ===
Wakeland was also victorious in the 1962 general elections, becoming the first MP from the constituency in independent Jamaica. He was returned for a third term in 1967 election, but died two months after assuming office. In the resulting by-election held on June 6, 1967, Allan Douglas was returned as MP. Douglas was subsequently appointed minister of youth and community development in the government of prime minister Hugh Shearer.

=== 1972-2020 ===
The PNP gained its first hold on the seat in the 1972 election on February 29, 1972, when the councillor for the Duncans division, Desmond Leakey, defeated the JLP’s Douglas 5,998 votes to 5,070. Leakey went on to win the 1976 general election. He then lost the seat to Keith Russell of the JLP in the 1980 general election by a margin of 1,122 votes. Russell was returned unopposed in the 1983 general election which was not contested by the PNP. Leakey regained the seat in 1989 by a margin of 3,229 votes, the largest ever recorded in the constituency. He was reelected in the 1993 general election and served until 1997. Leakey was succeeded by the PNP's Wendel Stewart. Stewart polled 9,397 votes to beat the JLP’s Charles HoShing (6,826) and the National Democratic Movement's (NDM) Phillip Service, who received 363 votes. This result is the second-highest margin of victory ever recorded in the constituency. Stewart served only one term in office and was replaced by the PNP's Patrick Harris who polled 9,029 votes against 7,840 for Christopher Jobson of the JLP and 135 votes for Olive Gardner of the NDM in the 2002 general election. Harris retained the seat with 10,164 votes versus 8,642 cast for Dennis Meadows of the JLP in the 2007 general election. In the 2011 general election, Patrick Atkinson, who had replaced Harris as the PNP's candidate, gained 10,869 votes to 8,548 for the JLP's Meadows, and 57 for Ras Astor Black of the Jamaica Alliance Movement (JAM). Atkinson was appointed independent Jamaica's eleventh Attorney General, serving from 2012 to 2016. The 2016 election saw the replacement of Atkinson by Victor Wright of the PNP. Wright polled 9,611 votes to Meadows of the JLP (9,162) to become member of parliament.

=== 2020-present ===
In the 2020 general election, Tova Hamilton of the JLP defeated the incumbent Victor Wright by 8,505 votes to 6,711 to become the first woman elected from the constituency.

== Members of Parliament ==
=== 1944 to Present ===
Election	Member	Party
1944	Clement Aitcheson	Jamaica Labour Party
1949	Allan Douglas	Jamaica Labour Party
1955	Allan Douglas	Jamaica Labour Party
1959	Elliston Wakeland	Jamaica Labour Party
1962	Elliston Wakeland	Jamaica Labour Party
1967	Elliston Wakeland	Jamaica Labour Party
1967	Allan Douglas	People's National Party
1972	Desmond Leakey	People's National Party
1976	Desmond Leakey	People's National Party
1980	Keith Russell	Jamaica Labour Party
1983	Keith Russell	Jamaica Labour Party
1989	Desmond Leakey	People's National Party
1993	Desmond Leakey	People's National Party
1997	Wendel Stewart	People's National Party
2002	Patrick Harris	People's National Party
2007	Patrick Harris	People's National Party
2011	Patrick Atkinson	People's National Party
2016	Victor Wright	People's National Party
2020	Tova Hamilton	Jamaica Labour Party

== Elections ==
=== Elections from 2000 to present ===
General election 2020: Trelawny Northern
Party	Candidate	Votes	%	±%
JLP	Tova Hamilton	8,508	55.5	▲6.9
PNP	Victor Wright	6,771	44.2	▼6.7
Independent	Genieve Dawkins	51	0.3	
Turnout		15,330		
Registered electors				
JLP gain from PNP				

General election 2016: Trelawny Northern
Party	Candidate	Votes	%	±%
PNP	Victor Wright	9,611	50.9	▼4.7
JLP	Dennis Meadows	9,162	48.6	▲4.8
Turnout		18,869	52.1	▼7.1
Registered electors		36,195		▲9.5
PNP hold				

General election 2011: Trelawny Northern
Party	Candidate	Votes	%	±%
PNP	Patrick Atkinson	10,869	55.6	
JLP	Dennis Meadows	8,548	43.8	
JAM	Astor Black	57	0.3	
Turnout		19,537	59.2	
Registered electors		33,029		
PNP hold				

== See also ==
- Politics of Jamaica
- Elections in Jamaica
