= Electoral divisions of Jamaica =

Jamaica's fourteen parishes are subdivided into sixty-three constituencies, which in turn are subdivided into electoral divisions.

== Electoral divisions as of 2019 ==
The following is the list of electoral divisions (as at April 2019) in each constituency.

| County | Parish | Constituency | Electoral Division | Populated Places | Note(s) |
|---|---|---|---|---|---|
| Cornwall | Hanover | Hanover Eastern | Chester Castle | ? | ? |
| Cornwall | Hanover | Hanover Eastern | Hopewell | ? | Constituency Office |
| Cornwall | Hanover | Hanover Eastern | Sandy Bay | ? | ? |
| Cornwall | Hanover | Hanover Western | Cauldwell | ? | ? |
| Cornwall | Hanover | Hanover Western | Green Island | ? | ? |
| Cornwall | Hanover | Hanover Western | Lucea | ? | Parish Capital; Constituency Office |
| Cornwall | Hanover | Hanover Western | Riverside | ? | ? |
| Cornwall | Saint Elizabeth | Saint Elizabeth North Eastern | Balaclava | ? | ? |
| Cornwall | Saint Elizabeth | Saint Elizabeth North Eastern | Braes River | ? | ? |
| Cornwall | Saint Elizabeth | Saint Elizabeth North Eastern | Santa Cruz | ? | Constituency Office |
| Cornwall | Saint Elizabeth | Saint Elizabeth North Eastern | Siloah | ? | ? |
| Cornwall | Saint Elizabeth | Saint Elizabeth North Western | Ipswich | ? | ? |
| Cornwall | Saint Elizabeth | Saint Elizabeth North Western | Lacovia | ? | Constituency Office |
| Cornwall | Saint Elizabeth | Saint Elizabeth North Western | New Narket | ? | ? |
| Cornwall | Saint Elizabeth | Saint Elizabeth South Eastern | Junction | ? | Constituency Office |
| Cornwall | Saint Elizabeth | Saint Elizabeth South Eastern | Malvern | ? | ? |
| Cornwall | Saint Elizabeth | Saint Elizabeth South Eastern | Myersville | ? | ? |
| Cornwall | Saint Elizabeth | Saint Elizabeth South Eastern | Southfield | ? | ? |
| Cornwall | Saint Elizabeth | Saint Elizabeth South Western | Black River | ? | Parish Capital; Constituency Office |
| Cornwall | Saint Elizabeth | Saint Elizabeth South Western | Brompton | ? | ? |
| Cornwall | Saint Elizabeth | Saint Elizabeth South Western | Mountainside | ? | ? |
| Cornwall | Saint Elizabeth | Saint Elizabeth South Western | Pedro Plain | ? | ? |
| Cornwall | Saint James | Saint James Central | Montego Bay South | ? | Constituency Office |
| Cornwall | Saint James | Saint James Central | Montego Bay South East | ? | ? |
| Cornwall | Saint James | Saint James Central | Salt Spring | ? | ? |
| Cornwall | Saint James | Saint James East Central | Rose Hill | ? | Constituency Office (Adelphi) |
| Cornwall | Saint James | Saint James East Central | Somerton | ? | ? |
| Cornwall | Saint James | Saint James East Central | Spring Mount | ? | ? |
| Cornwall | Saint James | Saint James North Western | Montego Bay Central | ? | Constituency Office |
| Cornwall | Saint James | Saint James North Western | Montego Bay North | ? | ? |
| Cornwall | Saint James | Saint James North Western | Montego Bay North East | ? | ? |
| Cornwall | Saint James | Saint James North Western | Montego Bay West | ? | ? |
| Cornwall | Saint James | Saint James Southern | Cambridge | ? | Constituency Office (Anchovy) |
| Cornwall | Saint James | Saint James Southern | Catadupa | ? | ? |
| Cornwall | Saint James | Saint James Southern | Maroon Town | ? | ? |
| Cornwall | Saint James | Saint James Southern | Welcome Hall | ? | ? |
| Cornwall | Saint James | Saint James West Central | Granville | ? | |
| Cornwall | Saint James | Saint James West Central | Mount Salem | ? | Constituency Office (Miriam Way) |
| Cornwall | Saint James | Saint James West Central | Spring Garden | ? | Region 3 Office (Fairview) |
| Cornwall | Trelawny | Trelawny Northern | Duncans | ? | ? |
| Cornwall | Trelawny | Trelawny Northern | Falmouth | ? | Parish Capital; Constituency Office |
| Cornwall | Trelawny | Trelawny Northern | Martha Brae | ? | ? |
| Cornwall | Trelawny | Trelawny Northern | Sherwood Content | ? | ? |
| Cornwall | Trelawny | Trelawny Northern | Wakefield | ? | ? |
| Cornwall | Trelawny | Trelawny Southern | Albert Town | ? | Constituency Office |
| Cornwall | Trelawny | Trelawny Southern | Lorrimers | ? | ? |
| Cornwall | Trelawny | Trelawny Southern | Ulster Spring | ? | ? |
| Cornwall | Trelawny | Trelawny Southern | Warsop | ? | ? |
| Cornwall | Westmoreland | Westmoreland Central | Cornwall Mountain | ? | ? |
| Cornwall | Westmoreland | Westmoreland Central | Frome | ? | ? |
| Cornwall | Westmoreland | Westmoreland Central | Petersfield | ? | |
| Cornwall | Westmoreland | Westmoreland Central | Savanna-La-Mar | ? | County Town Capital; Parish Capital; Constituency Office |
| Cornwall | Westmoreland | Westmoreland Central | Savanna-La-Mar North | ? | ? |
| Cornwall | Westmoreland | Westmoreland Eastern | Bethel Town | ? | ? |
| Cornwall | Westmoreland | Westmoreland Eastern | Darliston | ? | Constituency Office |
| Cornwall | Westmoreland | Westmoreland Eastern | Leamington | ? | ? |
| Cornwall | Westmoreland | Westmoreland Eastern | Whitehouse | ? | ? |
| Cornwall | Westmoreland | Westmoreland Western | Friendship | ? | ? |
| Cornwall | Westmoreland | Westmoreland Western | Grange Hill | ? | Constituency Office |
| Cornwall | Westmoreland | Westmoreland Western | Little London | ? | ? |
| Cornwall | Westmoreland | Westmoreland Western | Negril | ? | ? |
| Cornwall | Westmoreland | Westmoreland Western | Sheffield | ? | ? |
| Middlesex | Clarendon | Clarendon Central | Denbigh | ? | Region 5 Office (Denbigh) |
| Middlesex | Clarendon | Clarendon Central | May Pen East | ? | ? |
| Middlesex | Clarendon | Clarendon Central | May Pen North | ? | ? |
| Middlesex | Clarendon | Clarendon Central | May Pen West | ? | Parish Capital; Constituency Office |
| Middlesex | Clarendon | Clarendon Northern | Aenon Town | ? | ? |
| Middlesex | Clarendon | Clarendon Northern | Crofts Hill | ? | ? |
| Middlesex | Clarendon | Clarendon Northern | Kellits | ? | Constituency Office |
| Middlesex | Clarendon | Clarendon North Central | Chapelton | ? | Constituency Office |
| Middlesex | Clarendon | Clarendon North Central | Mocho | ? | ? |
| Middlesex | Clarendon | Clarendon North Central | Rock River | ? | ? |
| Middlesex | Clarendon | Clarendon North Western | Frankfield | ? | Constituency Office |
| Middlesex | Clarendon | Clarendon North Western | Ritchies | ? | ? |
| Middlesex | Clarendon | Clarendon North Western | Spalding | ? | ? |
| Middlesex | Clarendon | Clarendon North Western | Thompson Town | ? | ? |
| Middlesex | Clarendon | Clarendon South Eastern | Hayes | ? | ? |
| Middlesex | Clarendon | Clarendon South Eastern | Mineral Heights | ? | Constituency Office |
| Middlesex | Clarendon | Clarendon South Eastern | Palmers Cross | ? | ? |
| Middlesex | Clarendon | Clarendon South Eastern | Rocky Point | ? | ? |
| Middlesex | Clarendon | Clarendon South Western | Milk River | ? | ? |
| Middlesex | Clarendon | Clarendon South Western | Race Course | ? | ? |
| Middlesex | Clarendon | Clarendon South Western | Toll Gate | ? | Constituency Office (Four Paths) |
| Middlesex | Clarendon | Clarendon South Western | York Town | ? | ? |
| Middlesex | Manchester | Manchester Central | Bellefield | ? | ? |
| Middlesex | Manchester | Manchester Central | Knockpatrick | ? | ? |
| Middlesex | Manchester | Manchester Central | Mandeville | ? | Parish Capital; Region 4 Office; Constituency Office |
| Middlesex | Manchester | Manchester Central | Royal Flat | ? | ? |
| Middlesex | Manchester | Manchester North Eastern | Christiana | ? | Constituency Office |
| Middlesex | Manchester | Manchester North Eastern | Craighead | ? | ? |
| Middlesex | Manchester | Manchester North Eastern | Walderston | ? | ? |
| Middlesex | Manchester | Manchester North Western | Johns Hall | ? | ? |
| Middlesex | Manchester | Manchester North Western | Mile Gully | ? | Constituency Office |
| Middlesex | Manchester | Manchester North Western | New Green | ? | ? |
| Middlesex | Manchester | Manchester North Western | Spur Tree | ? | ? |
| Middlesex | Manchester | Manchester Southern | Alligator Pond | ? | Constituency Office (New Forest) |
| Middlesex | Manchester | Manchester Southern | Grove Town | ? | ? |
| Middlesex | Manchester | Manchester Southern | Newport | ? | Constituency Office (Rudd's Corner) |
| Middlesex | Manchester | Manchester Southern | Porus | ? | Constituency Office |
| Middlesex | Saint Ann | Saint Ann North Eastern | Exchange | ? | ? |
| Middlesex | Saint Ann | Saint Ann North Eastern | Lime Hall | ? | ? |
| Middlesex | Saint Ann | Saint Ann North Eastern | Ocho Ríos | ? | ? |
| Middlesex | Saint Ann | Saint Ann North Eastern | Saint Ann's Bay | ? | Region 2 Office; Constituency Office |
| Middlesex | Saint Ann | Saint Ann North Western | Bamboo | ? | |
| Middlesex | Saint Ann | Saint Ann North Western | Brown's Town | ? | Constituency Office |
| Middlesex | Saint Ann | Saint Ann North Western | Dry Harbour | ? | ? |
| Middlesex | Saint Ann | Saint Ann North Western | Sturge Town | ? | ? |
| Middlesex | Saint Ann | Saint Ann South Eastern | Beecher Town | ? | ? |
| Middlesex | Saint Ann | Saint Ann South Eastern | Bensonton | ? | ? |
| Middlesex | Saint Ann | Saint Ann South Eastern | Claremont | Barrett Hall, Beechamville | Constituency Office |
| Middlesex | Saint Ann | Saint Ann South Eastern | Moneague | Devon, Grierfield, Moneague Housing Scheme, Roadside, Silk Field, Swamp, Clapham, River Head, Watsonville | ? |
| Middlesex | Saint Ann | Saint Ann South Western | Alexandria | ? | Constituency Office (Bethany) |
| Middlesex | Saint Ann | Saint Ann South Western | Borobridge | ? | ? |
| Middlesex | Saint Ann | Saint Ann South Western | Calderwood | ? | ? |
| Middlesex | Saint Ann | Saint Ann South Western | Gibraltar | ? | ? |
| Middlesex | Saint Catherine | Saint Catherine Central | Ensom City | ? | ? |
| Middlesex | Saint Catherine | Saint Catherine Central | Hampton Green | ? | Constituency Office |
| Middlesex | Saint Catherine | Saint Catherine Central | Spanish Town | ? | County Town Capital; Parish Capital; Region 6 Office |
| Middlesex | Saint Catherine | Saint Catherine Eastern | De La Vega City | ? | ? |
| Middlesex | Saint Catherine | Saint Catherine Eastern | Greendale | ? | ? |
| Middlesex | Saint Catherine | Saint Catherine Eastern | Lauriston | ? | ? |
| Middlesex | Saint Catherine | Saint Catherine Eastern | Twickenham Park | ? | Constituency Office |
| Middlesex | Saint Catherine | Saint Catherine East Central | Gregory Park | ? | ? |
| Middlesex | Saint Catherine | Saint Catherine East Central | Portmore Pines | ? | Constituency Office |
| Middlesex | Saint Catherine | Saint Catherine East Central | Southboro | ? | ? |
| Middlesex | Saint Catherine | Saint Catherine North Central | Above Rocks | ? | ? |
| Middlesex | Saint Catherine | Saint Catherine North Central | Angels | ? | ? |
| Middlesex | Saint Catherine | Saint Catherine North Central | Bog Walk | ? | Constituency Office |
| Middlesex | Saint Catherine | Saint Catherine North Central | Sligoville | ? | ? |
| Middlesex | Saint Catherine | Saint Catherine North Eastern | Guys Hill | ? | ? |
| Middlesex | Saint Catherine | Saint Catherine North Eastern | Mount Industry | ? | ? |
| Middlesex | Saint Catherine | Saint Catherine North Eastern | Troja | ? | Constituency Office |
| Middlesex | Saint Catherine | Saint Catherine North Western | Ewarton | ? | ? |
| Middlesex | Saint Catherine | Saint Catherine North Western | Linstead | ? | Constituency Office |
| Middlesex | Saint Catherine | Saint Catherine North Western | Lluidas Vale | ? | ? |
| Middlesex | Saint Catherine | Saint Catherine North Western | Treadways | ? | ? |
| Middlesex | Saint Catherine | Saint Catherine Southern | Braeton | ? | ? |
| Middlesex | Saint Catherine | Saint Catherine Southern | Greater Portmore East | ? | ? |
| Middlesex | Saint Catherine | Saint Catherine Southern | Greater Portmore North | ? | Constituency Office |
| Middlesex | Saint Catherine | Saint Catherine Southern | Hellshire | ? | ? |
| Middlesex | Saint Catherine | Saint Catherine South Central | Homestead | ? | ? |
| Middlesex | Saint Catherine | Saint Catherine South Central | Horizon Park | ? | ? |
| Middlesex | Saint Catherine | Saint Catherine South Central | Sydenham | ? | Constituency Office |
| Middlesex | Saint Catherine | Saint Catherine South Eastern | Bridgeport | ? | ? |
| Middlesex | Saint Catherine | Saint Catherine South Eastern | Edgewater | ? | Constituency Office (Portmore C.B.D.) |
| Middlesex | Saint Catherine | Saint Catherine South Eastern | Independent City | ? | ? |
| Middlesex | Saint Catherine | Saint Catherine South Eastern | Waterford | ? | ? |
| Middlesex | Saint Catherine | Saint Catherine South Eastern | Westchester | ? | ? |
| Middlesex | Saint Catherine | Saint Catherine South Western | Church Pen | ? | ? |
| Middlesex | Saint Catherine | Saint Catherine South Western | Old Harbour Central | ? | Constituency Office |
| Middlesex | Saint Catherine | Saint Catherine South Western | Old Harbour North | ? | ? |
| Middlesex | Saint Catherine | Saint Catherine South Western | Old Harbour South | ? | ? |
| Middlesex | Saint Catherine | Saint Catherine West Central | Bellevue | ? | ? |
| Middlesex | Saint Catherine | Saint Catherine West Central | Ginger Ridge | ? | ? |
| Middlesex | Saint Catherine | Saint Catherine West Central | Point Hill | ? | ? |
| Middlesex | Saint Catherine | Saint Catherine West Central | Red Hills | ? | Constituency Office (Kitson Town) |
| Middlesex | Saint Mary | Saint Mary Central | Hampstead | ? | ? |
| Middlesex | Saint Mary | Saint Mary Central | Highgate | ? | Constituency Office |
| Middlesex | Saint Mary | Saint Mary Central | Islington | ? | ? |
| Middlesex | Saint Mary | Saint Mary Central | Port Maria | ? | Parish Capital |
| Middlesex | Saint Mary | Saint Mary South Eastern | Annotto Bay | ? | Constituency Office (Top Bay) |
| Middlesex | Saint Mary | Saint Mary South Eastern | Belfield | ? | ? |
| Middlesex | Saint Mary | Saint Mary South Eastern | Castleton | ? | ? |
| Middlesex | Saint Mary | Saint Mary South Eastern | Richmond | ? | ? |
| Middlesex | Saint Mary | Saint Mary Western | Bosscobel | ? | ? |
| Middlesex | Saint Mary | Saint Mary Western | Carron Hall | ? | ? |
| Middlesex | Saint Mary | Saint Mary Western | Gayle | ? | ? |
| Middlesex | Saint Mary | Saint Mary Western | Oracabessa | ? | Constituency Office |
| Middlesex | Saint Mary | Saint Mary Western | Retreat | ? | ? |
| Surrey | Kingston | Kingston Central | Allman Town | ? | ? |
| Surrey | Kingston | Kingston Central | Rae Town | ? | Region 7 Office; Region 8 Office; Constituency Office |
| Surrey | Kingston | Kingston Eastern & Port Royal | Norman Gardens | ? | Constituency Office |
| Surrey | Kingston | Kingston Eastern & Port Royal | Springfield | ? | ? |
| Surrey | Kingston | Kingston Western | Denham Town | ? | Constituency Office (Heroes Circle) |
| Surrey | Kingston | Kingston Western | Tivali Gardens | ? | Constituency Office |
| Surrey | Portland | Portland Eastern | Fairy Hill | ? | ? |
| Surrey | Portland | Portland Eastern | Fellowship | ? | ? |
| Surrey | Portland | Portland Eastern | Manchioneal | ? | ? |
| Surrey | Portland | Portland Eastern | Port Antonio | ? | Parish Capital; Constituency Office |
| Surrey | Portland | Portland Eastern | Prospect | ? | ? |
| Surrey | Portland | Portland Western | Balcarres | ? | ? |
| Surrey | Portland | Portland Western | Buff Bay | ? | Constituency Office |
| Surrey | Portland | Portland Western | Hope Bay | ? | ? |
| Surrey | Portland | Portland Western | Saint Margaret's Bay | ? | ? |
| Surrey | Saint Andrew | Saint Andrew Eastern | Mona | ? | ? |
| Surrey | Saint Andrew | Saint Andrew Eastern | Papine | ? | Constituency Office |
| Surrey | Saint Andrew | Saint Andrew East Central | Cassia Park | ? | Constituency Office |
| Surrey | Saint Andrew | Saint Andrew East Central | Hagley Park | ? | ? |
| Surrey | Saint Andrew | Saint Andrew East Central | Maxfield Park | ? | ? |
| Surrey | Saint Andrew | Saint Andrew East Rural | Dallas | ? | ? |
| Surrey | Saint Andrew | Saint Andrew East Rural | Gordon Town | ? | ? |
| Surrey | Saint Andrew | Saint Andrew East Rural | Harbour View | ? | Constituency Office |
| Surrey | Saint Andrew | Saint Andrew East Rural | Kintyre | ? | ? |
| Surrey | Saint Andrew | Saint Andrew East Rural | Mavis Bank | ? | ? |
| Surrey | Saint Andrew | Saint Andrew North Central | Norbrook | ? | Constituency Office |
| Surrey | Saint Andrew | Saint Andrew North Central | Whitehall | ? | ? |
| Surrey | Saint Andrew | Saint Andrew North Eastern | Barbican | ? | ? |
| Surrey | Saint Andrew | Saint Andrew North Eastern | Waterloo | ? | Constituency Office |
| Surrey | Saint Andrew | Saint Andrew North Western | Chancery Hill | ? | ? |
| Surrey | Saint Andrew | Saint Andrew North Western | Havendale | ? | ? |
| Surrey | Saint Andrew | Saint Andrew North Western | Hughenden | ? | Constituency Office (Maverly) |
| Surrey | Saint Andrew | Saint Andrew Southern | Admiral Town | ? | Constituency Office |
| Surrey | Saint Andrew | Saint Andrew Southern | Trench Town | ? | ? |
| Surrey | Saint Andrew | Saint Andrew South Eastern | Trafalgar | ? | Constituency Office |
| Surrey | Saint Andrew | Saint Andrew South Eastern | Vineyard Town | ? | ? |
| Surrey | Saint Andrew | Saint Andrew South Western | Greenwich Town | ? | ? |
| Surrey | Saint Andrew | Saint Andrew South Western | Payne Lands | ? | ? |
| Surrey | Saint Andrew | Saint Andrew South Western | Whitfield Town | ? | ? |
| Surrey | Saint Andrew | Saint Andrew Western | Duhaney Park | ? | Constituency Office |
| Surrey | Saint Andrew | Saint Andrew Western | Seaview Gardens | ? | Constituency Office |
| Surrey | Saint Andrew | Saint Andrew Western | Waterhouse | ? | ? |
| Surrey | Saint Andrew | Saint Andrew West Central | Molynes Gardens | ? | Constituency Office |
| Surrey | Saint Andrew | Saint Andrew West Central | Olympics Gardens | ? | ? |
| Surrey | Saint Andrew | Saint Andrew West Central | Seivwright Gardens | ? | ? |
| Surrey | Saint Andrew | Saint Andrew West Rural | Brandon Hill | ? | ? |
| Surrey | Saint Andrew | Saint Andrew West Rural | Lawrence Tavern | ? | ? |
| Surrey | Saint Andrew | Saint Andrew West Rural | Red Hills | ? | Constituency Office |
| Surrey | Saint Andrew | Saint Andrew West Rural | Stony Hill | ? | Constituency Office (Golden Spring) |
| Surrey | Saint Thomas | Saint Thomas Eastern | Bath | ? | ? |
| Surrey | Saint Thomas | Saint Thomas Eastern | Dalvey | ? | ? |
| Surrey | Saint Thomas | Saint Thomas Eastern | Morant Bay | ? | Parish Capital; Constituency Office |
| Surrey | Saint Thomas | Saint Thomas Eastern | Port Morant | ? | ? |
| Surrey | Saint Thomas | Saint Thomas Western | Cedar Valley | ? | ? |
| Surrey | Saint Thomas | Saint Thomas Western | Llandewey | ? | ? |
| Surrey | Saint Thomas | Saint Thomas Western | Seaforth | ? | ? |
| Surrey | Saint Thomas | Saint Thomas Western | Trinityville | ? | ? |
| Surrey | Saint Thomas | Saint Thomas Western | White Horses | ? | ? |
| Surrey | Saint Thomas | Saint Thomas Western | Yallahs | ? | Constituency Office |
