= Trelawny Southern =

Jamaican parliamentary constituency

- constituency for the Parliament of Jamaica
- Parish: Trelawny
- County: Cornwall
- Population: 26,564 (2011 census)
- Electorate: 19,716 (2020)
- Major settlements: Albert Town, Wait-a-Bit, Ulster Spring

Current constituency
- Created: 1944
- Party: Jamaica Labour Party
- Member of Parliament: Vacant
- Electoral divisions: Albert Town, Ulster Spring, Warsop, Lorrimers
- Returning officer: Talbert Golding
- Constituency number: 28

Trelawny Southern is a parliamentary constituency represented in the House of Representatives of the Jamaican Parliament. It elects one Member of Parliament (MP) by the first past the post system of election. It was one of the 32 constituencies fixed in the new constitution granted to Jamaica in 1944. The constituency has featured in all 16 contested Parliamentary General Elections from 1944 to 2016. The last MP was Marisa Dalrymple-Philibert, representing the Jamaica Labour Party, who has been in office since 2007. She was Speaker and resigned as MP on September 21, 2023.

== Boundaries ==
The constituency covers four of the nine electoral divisions in the parish of Trelawny – Warsop to the west, Albert Town to the north, Ulster Spring to the north-east, and Lorrimers to the south.

== Demographics ==
According to the Jamaica Population Census of 2011, the number of persons living in the constituency was 26,564, while the number of registered voters was 17,953. As of the 2020 general election, the number of registered electors in the constituency was 19,716. This represents a 2.2% increase over the 19,289 voters registered for the 2016 general election.

Voter Distribution by Electoral Division
Electoral Division	Number of Polling Divisions	Number of electors
Albert Town	17	4,492
Lorrimers	23	6,681
Ulster Spring	21	3,544
Warsop	20	4,819
Grand total	81	19,716

== Members of Parliament ==
=== 1944 to Present ===
Election	Member	Party
1944	Matthew Thelwell	Jamaica Labour Party
1949	Felix Toyloy	Jamaica Labour Party
1955	Felix Toyloy	Jamaica Labour Party
1959	James Binns	People's National Party
1962	Felix Toyloy	Jamaica Labour Party
1967	Albert Belinfanti	People's National Party
1972	Albert Belinfanti	People's National Party
1976	Albert Belinfanti	People's National Party
1980	Lloyd Bascoe	Jamaica Labour Party
1983	Lloyd Bascoe	Jamaica Labour Party
1989	Lyndel Frater	People's National Party
1993	Brascoe Lee	Jamaica Labour Party
1997	Doreen Chen	People's National Party
2002	Devon McDaniel	Jamaica Labour Party
2007	Marisa Dalrymple-Philibert	Jamaica Labour Party
2011	Marisa Dalrymple-Philibert	Jamaica Labour Party
2016	Marisa Dalrymple-Philibert	Jamaica Labour Party
2020	Marisa Dalrymple-Philibert	Jamaica Labour Party

== Elections ==
=== Elections from 2000 to Present ===
General Election 2020: Trelawny Southern
Party	Candidate	Votes	%	±%
JLP	Marisa Dalrymple-Philibert	7,093	69.9	▲11.0
PNP	Lloyd Gillings	3,030	29.9	▼10.1
Independent	Richard Sharpe	24	0.2	▼10.7
Turnout		10,147		
Registered electors				
JLP hold				

General Election 2016: Trelawny Southern
Party	Candidate	Votes	%	±%
JLP	Marisa Dalrymple-Philibert	6,622	58.9	▲2.2
PNP	Lloyd Gillings	4,558	40.6	▼2.3
Turnout		11,235	58.3	▼3.2
Registered electors		19,289		▲7.4
JLP hold				

General Election 2011: Trelawny Southern
Party	Candidate	Votes	%	±%
JLP	Marisa Dalrymple-Philibert	6,260	56.7	
PNP	Lyndel Frater	4,735	42.9	
Turnout		11,043	61.5	
Registered electors		17,953		
JLP hold				

== See also ==
- Politics of Jamaica
- Elections in Jamaica
