= 1989 Jamaican general election =

1989 Jamaica general election
- 9 February 1989

All 60 seats in the Jamaica House of Representatives
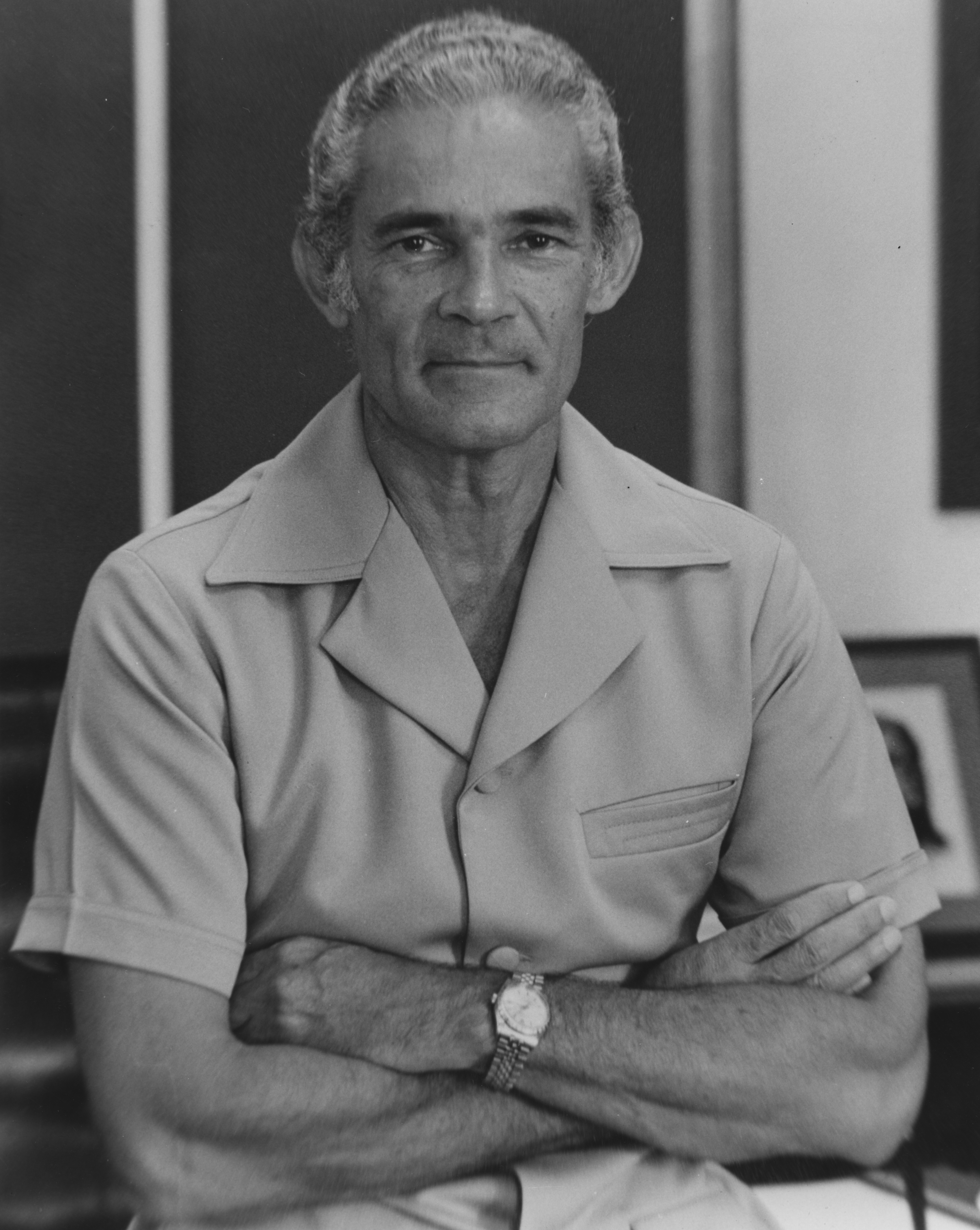

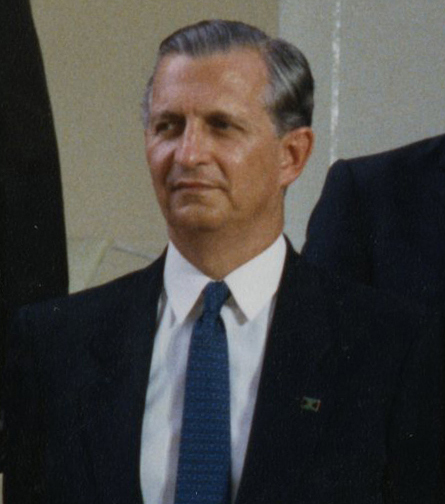
	First party	Second party
Leader	Michael Manley	Edward Seaga
Party	PNP	JLP
Leader since	1969	23 November 1974
Leader's seat	Kingston East & Port Royal	Kingston West
Last election	0 seats (boycotted)	60 seats, 89.7%
Seats before		60
Seats won	45	15
Seat change	▲45	▼45
Popular vote	473,754	362,589
Percentage	56.6%	43.3%
Swing	▲56.6%	▼46.4%
Prime Minister before election
Edward Seaga
JLP
Prime Minister after election
Michael Manley
PNP

General elections were held in Jamaica on 9 February 1989. The result was a landslide victory for the People's National Party, which won 45 of the 60 seats. Voter turnout was 78%.

They were the first seriously contested elections since 1980, as the PNP had boycotted the 1983 snap elections to protest the refusal of the ruling Jamaican Labour Party to update the electoral roll amid allegations of voter fraud.

Prime Minister Edward Seaga announced the election date on 15 January at a rally in Kingston, with the emergency conditions caused by Hurricane Gilbert in 1988 forcing an extension of the parliamentary term beyond its normal five-year mandate.

== Campaign ==
The election date and tone of the election were shaped in part by Hurricane Gilbert, which made landfall in September 1988 and decimated the island. The hurricane caused almost $1 billion worth of damage to the island, with banana and coffee crops wiped out and thousands of homes destroyed. Both parties engaged in campaigning through the distribution of relief supplies, a hallmark of the Jamaican patronage system. Political commentators noted that prior to the hurricane, Edward Seaga and the JLP trailed Michael Manley and the PNP by twenty points in opinion polls. The ability to provide relief as the party in charge allowed Seaga to improve his standing among voters and erode the inevitability of Manley's victory. However, scandals related to the relief effort cost Seaga and the JLP some of the gains made immediately following the hurricane. Scandals that emerged included National Security Minister Errol Anderson personally controlling a warehouse full of disaster relief supplies and candidate Joan Gordon-Webley distributing American-donated flour in sacks with her picture on them.

The election was characterized by a narrower ideological difference between the two parties on economic issues. Michael Manley facilitated his comeback campaign by moderating his leftist positions and admitting mistakes made as prime minister, saying he erred when he involved government in economic production and had abandoned all thoughts of nationalizing industry. He cited the PNP's desire to continue the market-oriented policies of the JLP government, but with a more participatory approach. Prime Minister Edward Seaga ran on his record of economic growth and the reduction of unemployment in Jamaica, using the campaign slogan "Don't Let Them Wreck It Again" to refer to Manley's tenure as prime minister. Seaga during his tenure as prime minister emphasized the need to tighten public sector spending and cut close to 27,000 public sector jobs in 1983 and 1984. He shifted his plans as elections neared with a promise to spend J$1 billion on a five-year Social Well-Being Programme, which would build new hospitals and schools in Jamaica.

Foreign policy also played a role in the 1989 election. Prime Minister Edward Seaga emphasized his relations with the United States, a relationship which saw Jamaica receiving considerable economic aid from the U.S and additional loans from international institutions. Manley pledged better relations with the United States while at the same time pledging to restore diplomatic relations with Cuba that had been cut under Seaga. With Manley as prime minister, Jamaican-American relations had significantly frayed as a result of Manley's economic policies and close relations with Cuba.

The personalities of the two party leaders helped shape the 1989 campaign. While Seaga was portrayed as a good manager with a cold public demeanor, Manley was perceived as a person with suspect managerial skills but exceptional personal magnetism. Seaga summarized the two personalities by saying, "Some people prefer to have a husband who will provide for them and give them security. Others are looking for a lover to give them joy."

== Results ==
Party	Votes	%	Seats	+/–
People's National Party	473,754	56.60	45	+45
Jamaica Labour Party	362,589	43.32	15	–45
Independents	628	0.08	0	0
Total	836,971	100.00	60	0
Valid votes	836,971	98.99		
Invalid/blank votes	8,514	1.01		
Total votes	845,485	100.00		
Registered voters/turnout	1,078,760	78.38		
Source: Nohlen

=== By constituency ===
Constituency	Jamaica Labour Party			People's National Party			Independents		
Constituency	Candidate	Votes	%	Candidate	Votes	%	Candidate	Votes	%
Kingston Western	Edward Seaga	11,744	81.79	Clinton Davy	2,615	18.21			
Kingston Central	Olivia Grange	5,758	43.02	Ralph Brown	7,627	56.98			
Kingston East & Port Royal	Granclett Cadienhead	2,392	19.17	Michael Manley	10,084	80.83			
St. Andrew West Rural	Kenneth Baugh	8,074	49.70	Claude Clarke	8,170	50.30			
St. Andrew Western	Lee R. Clarke	7,223	41.13	Onel Williams	10,298	58.64	Don Jenkins	40	0.23
St. Andrew West Central	Ferdinand Yap	10,458	44.39	Arnold Nicholson	13,102	55.61			
St. Andrew East Central	Merlene Heholt	4,088	26.61	Arthur Jones	11,276	73.39			
St. Andrew South Western	Royland Williams	396	2.09	Portia Simpson	18,577	97.91			
St. Andrew Southern	Earlston Spencer	5,092	25.60	Hartley E. Jones	14,798	74.40			
St. Andrew South Eastern	Ryan G. Peralto	5,371	45.41	Easton W.X. Douglas	6,444	54.48	Jasmin A. Brown	14	0.12
St. Andrew Eastern	Edmund Bartlett	6,802	54.85	Oswald S. Seymour	5,599	45.15			
St. Andrew North Central	Karl Samuda	7,017	57.70	Shirley-Ann Eaton	5,144	42.30			
St. Andrew North Western	Derrick C. Smith	5,392	51.10	Jepthah V. Ford	5,159	48.90			
St. Andrew East Rural	Joan Gordon-Webley	6,686	51.10	Emerson Barrett	7,070	48.90			
St. Thomas Western	Errol Anderson	9,390	54.55	Ronald G. Lampart	7,822	45.45			
St. Thomas Eastern	Pearnel Charles	7,930	51.12	Franklyn Sephestine	7,462	48.10	Roosevelt S. Barrant	122	0.79
Portland Eastern	Dennis M. Wright	6,426	42.21	H. Sam Lawrence	8,799	57.79			
Portland Western	St. Clair O. Shirley	5,977	46.60	Errol F. Ennis	6,848	53.40			
St. Mary South Eastern	Alva Ross	6,476	46.94	Harry G. Douglas	7,319	53.06			
St. Mary Central	Neville G. Murray	4,166	31.68	Horace A. Clarke	8,983	68.32			
St. Mary Western	Hyacinth M. Knight	6,520	41.77	Terrence D. Gillette	9,089	58.23			
St. Ann South Eastern	Kern Christian	3,290	26.65	Seymour Mullings	9,056	73.35			
St. Ann North Eastern	Patricia Pink	6,227	39.51	Norman Manley	9,532	60.49			
St. Ann North Western	Ernest A. Smith	6,639	46.35	Burchell Whiteman	7,684	53.65			
St. Ann South Western	Neville Gallimore	6,916	59.45	Newton Richards	4,717	40.55			
Trelawny Northern	Keith E. Russell	6,874	40.49	Desmond Leakey	10,103	59.51			
Trelawny Southern	Brascoe L. Lee	5,662	49.24	Lyndel L. Frater	5,837	50.76			
St. James East Central	Godfrey G. Dyer	4,598	44.84	Violet Neilson	5,656	55.16			
St. James North Western	Charles E. Sinclair	6,108	41.10	Carl E. Miller	8,753	58.90			
St. James West Central	Winston Watt	5,165	40.30	Patrick Rose-Green	7,651	59.70			
St. James Southern	Ephraim A. Morgan	3,858	31.39	Derrick F.L. Kellier	7,980	64.93	Princess E. Vernon	452	3.68
Hanover Eastern	Franklin D. Jackson	5,269	44.02	Aston S. King	6,700	55.98			
Hanover Western	Horace Chang	6,096	41.54	Benjamin A.L. Clare	8,578	58.46			
Westmoreland Western	Russell O. Hammond	4,335	33.12	Kenneth McNeill	8,755	66.88			
Westmoreland Central	Carlton C.C. Jones	4,324	35.03	Enoch C.K. Blythe	8,021	64.97			
Westmoreland North Eastern	Astil Sangster	4,331	37.47	Headly Cunningham	7,229	62.53			
Westmoreland South Eastern	Percival LaTouche	3,999	36.00	P.J. Patterson	7,108	64.00			
St. Elizabeth North Western	Neville B. Lewis	6,656	52.13	Caswell Daley	6,111	47.87			
St. Elizabeth North Eastern	Hugh A. Dawes	5,433	37.53	Sydney R. Pagon	9,042	62.47			
St. Elizabeth South Western	Derrick Sangster	6,478	46.41	Donald B. Buchanan	7,479	53.59			
St. Elizabeth South Eastern	Jeremy A. Palmer	6,144	42.95	Derrick A. Rochester	8,162	57.05			
Manchester Southern	Lloyd G. Bent	5,604	39.41	Douglas Manley	8,615	60.59			
Manchester Central	Cecil Charlton	6,655	47.41	John Junor	7,384	52.59			
Manchester North Western	Stafford S. Haughton	4,420	36.21	Dean A. Peart	7,787	63.79			
Manchester North Eastern	Audley Shaw	6,866	49.25	Calvin S. Lyn	7,076	50.75			
Clarendon North Western	Clifton Stone	6,675	47.63	Carl Marshall	7,339	52.37			
Clarendon Northern	J.A.G. Smith	6,135	46.65	Horace Daley	7,015	53.35			
Clarendon North Central	Errol A. Dunkley	6,429	56.77	N.C. Bachelor	4,895	43.23			
Clarendon Central	Lester Michael Henry	6,768	51.85	Donna Marie Scott-Bhoorasingh	6,286	48.15			
Clarendon South Western	Arthur H.W. Williams	4,788	36.56	Orville D. Ramtallie	8,307	63.46			
Clarendon South Eastern	Hugh Shearer	7,299	50.01	Emanuel Cousins	7,295	49.99			
St. Catherine North Western	John Franklyn	3,959	30.78	Robert D. Pickersgill	8,904	59.22			
St. Catherine South Western	Michael A. Williams	7,044	44.88	Rudyard E. Lawson	8,652	55.22			
St. Catherine Southern	Thomas Tavares-Finson	7,848	48.52	Hugh Small	8,325	51.48			
St. Catherine Central	Bruce Golding	12,062	63.77	Vincent L. Edwards	6,852	36.23			
St. Catherine South Eastern	Jeanette Grant-Woodham	5,651	40.83	Carl Rattray	8,189	59.17			
St. Catherine East Central	Ruby C. Walcott	5,070	34.22	Keith D. St. A. Knight	9,744	65.78			
St. Catherine West Central	Enid Bennett	6,340	54.70	Enoch L. Blake	5,250	45.30			
St. Catherine North Eastern	Anthony S.R. Johnson	5,740	55.49	Phyllis Mitchell	4,604	44.51			
Source: Electoral Commission of Jamaica
