= Hyacinth Knight =

Jamaican politician (1939/1940–2026)

MP for Saint Mary Western
- In office 1983–1989

Personal details
- Born: May 20, 1942
- Died: 9 September 2026 (aged 86) Saint Andrew, Jamaica Saint Andrew Memorial Hospital
- Party: Jamaica Labour Party

Hyacinth May Williams Née Knight (1939/1940 – 9 September 2026) was a Jamaican politician and educator. She was a member of the Parliament of Jamaica from 1983 to 1989 for the Jamaica Labour Party (JLP).

== Political career ==
In 1983, Knight was elected as a member of Parliament to represent the western district of Saint Mary Parish. She ran as a member of the Jamaica Labour Party.

Knight was an unsuccessful JLP candidate in 1997 and 2002.

In October 2010, in Port Maria, Knight was honoured by Mayor Richard Creary "for outstanding contribution to Education and Community Development".

== Personal life and death ==
Knight had four children. She died on 9 September 2026 at the Andrews Memorial Hospital, at the age of 86.

== See also ==
- List of female members of the House of Representatives of Jamaica
