= Saint Andrew South Eastern =

Parliamentary constituency of Jamaica

Saint Andrew South Eastern is a parliamentary constituency represented in the House of Representatives of the Jamaican Parliament, It elects one Member of Parliament MP by the first past the post system of election. The constituency was created in 1967.

== Boundaries ==
The constituency covers Vineyard Town and Trafalgar in St. Andrew Parish.

== Members of Parliament ==
Election	Member	Party
1967	Keble Munn	People's National Party
1976	Eric Bell	People's National Party
1980	Allan Isaac	Jamaica Labour Party
1983	Winston Spaulding	Jamaica Labour Party
1989	Easton Douglas	People's National Party
2002	Maxine Henry-Wilson	People's National Party
2011	Julian Robinson	People's National Party

== Elections ==
Jamaican general election, 2007: Saint Andrew South Eastern
Party	Candidate	Votes	%	±%
PNP	Maxine Henry-Wilson	5,126	52.76	
JLP	Joan Gordon-Webley	4,589	47.24	
Total votes		10,070	100.0	
Turnout			59.37	
PNP hold				
