= Devon McDaniel =

Jamaican politician

MP for Trelawny Southern
- In office 2002–2007
- Preceded by: Doreen Chen
- Succeeded by: Marisa Dalrymple-Philibert

Personal details
- Party: Jamaica Labour Party

Devon McDaniel is a Jamaican politician.

== Career ==
McDaniel is a furniture business operator from Warsop in Trelawny Parish. In the 2002 Jamaican general election, McDaniel was elected to the Parliament of Jamaica for Trelawny Southern. He will contest Trelawny Southern in the 2025 Jamaican general election.
