= Douglas Vaz =

Jamaican politician (1930s–2019)

Douglas Vaz (died 9 November 2019) was a Jamaican politician.

Vaz was a member of the Jamaica Labour Party, which he represented throughout his political career. He was first elected to the Parliament of Jamaica in 1976, from the North Central St Andrew constituency. Vaz switched districts in 1989, to the North East St Andrew constituency, vacating North Central St Andrew for Karl Samuda. Vaz lost his seat in North East St Andrew to Karlene Kirlew-Robertson in 1993. Between 1980 and 1989, Vaz served in the Cabinet of Jamaica formed by prime minister Edward Seaga, as the minister of industry and commerce.

== Political views ==
In 1973, Douglas Vaz, then president of the Jamaica Manufacturers Association (JMA), publicly criticized Michael Manley’s declaration of support for African liberation struggles. Manley had pledged material and moral support for African independence movements, particularly in Southern Africa, where countries like Zambia and Zimbabwe were fighting against colonial rule and apartheid.

== 1990 Spy Scandal, "Gang of Five" Rebellion, and Departure from JLP ==
Following the Jamaica Labour Party's (JLP) defeat in the 1989 general election, Vaz's relations with JLP Leader Edward Seaga grew severely strained over disagreements regarding the party's centralized management structure and leadership style. Tensions boiled over into a public political crisis in April 1990 when former JLP Senator Abe Dabdoub revealed an internal party wiretapping and electronic surveillance operation targeting senior members who were critical of the leadership.

The fallout from the scandal solidified a distinct dissident faction comprising Vaz and four other former cabinet ministers—Pearnel Charles, Karl Samuda, Edmund Bartlett, and Errol Anderson—who were dubbed the "Gang of Five" by political pollster Professor Carl Stone. The group openly challenged Seaga's leadership and actively resisted a directive by Party Chairman Bruce Golding forcing all JLP parliamentarians to sign a mandatory loyalty oath regarding collective responsibility. Seaga's subsequent attempts to divide the faction by offering conditional communication, as well as demands that they publicly retract their support for the whistleblowers, failed.

The severe internal disciplinary measures and eventual expulsions permanently severed Vaz's ties to the JLP leadership, which he later characterized as a dark period of contrived political collusion. After stepping down from parliamentary politics ahead of the 1993 elections, Vaz formally exited the party entirely. In 1995, he co-founded the National Democratic Movement (NDM) alongside Bruce Golding, serving as a key architect of the new political alternative. While Douglas Vaz never returned to the JLP prior to his passing in 2019, his son Daryl Vaz later entered electoral politics as a prominent JLP Member of Parliament and Cabinet minister.

== Personal life ==
Vaz married Sonia in 1959. The couple divorced in 1984. Their son, Daryl Vaz, is also a politician. Douglas Vaz died in his sleep on 9 November 2019, aged 83.
