= Iris Collins =

Jamaican businesswoman and politician

Member of the House of Representatives
- In office 1944–1949
- Preceded by: Allan Coombs
- Succeeded by: Allan Coombs
- Constituency: Saint James North Western

Personal details
- Born: 31 January 1915 Cambridge, Jamaica
- Died: June 2001 (aged 86) Canada

Iris Rhudella Collins-Williams (31 January 1915 – June 2001) was a Jamaican businesswoman and politician. She was elected to the House of Representatives in 1944, becoming its first female member.

== Biography ==
Collins was born in Cambridge in January 1915, the fourth daughter of Catherine and Welham Collins, who were farmers. She attended Westwood High School, graduating in 1929, after which she then studied at Business College in Kingston from 1930 to 1932. She subsequently worked as a stenographer for Desnoes & Geddes from 1933 to 1936, after which she became a produce dealer in Cambridge.

In 1939 she was elected to the Parochial Board of Saint James Parish, remaining an elected member until 1944. A member of the Jamaica Labour Party, she contested the Saint James North Western constituency in the 1944 elections and defeated the incumbent MHA Allan Coombs, becoming the first woman elected to the House of Representatives. During her term in the House, she was a member of the Education, Social Welfare, Agriculture, Lands and Commerce committees. She also remained on Saint James parochial board, sitting as an ex officio member. She remained a member until the 1949 elections, when she was defeated by Coombs.

She died in Canada in June 2001.

== See also ==
- Women in the House of Representatives of Jamaica
