= Saint Andrew East Rural (Jamaica Parliament constituency) =

Parliamentary constituency of Jamaica

- Constituency

Current constituency

Saint Andrew East Rural is a parliamentary constituency represented in the House of Representatives of the Jamaican Parliament. It elects one Member of Parliament MP by the first past the post system of election.

== Boundaries ==
The constituency includes Constitution Hill, Dallas Castle, Gordon Town, Maryland, Woodford and Mavis Bank.

== Members of Parliament ==
Election	Member	Party
1959	Keble Munn	People's National Party
1967	David Lindo	Jamaica Labour Party
1972	Eric Bell	People's National Party
1976	Roy McGann	People's National Party
1980	Joan Gordon-Webley	Jamaica Labour Party
1989	E. G. G. Barrett	People's National Party
1993	Horace Clue	People's National Party
2002	Joseph Hibbert	Jamaica Labour Party
2011	Damion Crawford	People's National Party
2016	Juliet Holness	Jamaica Labour Party
2020	Juliet Holness	Jamaica Labour Party

== Elections ==
General Election 2007: Saint Andrew East Rural
Party	Candidate	Votes	%	±%
JLP	Joseph Hibbert	8,283	50.66	
PNP	Mikael Phillips	7,885	48.23	
National Democratic Movement	Percival Hurditt	182	1.11	
Total votes		16,350	100.0	
Turnout			60.24	
JLP hold				
