= Saint James East Central =

Parliamentary constituency of Jamaica

- constituency for the Parliament of Jamaica
- Parish: St. James
- County: Cornwall
- Population: 36,689 (2011 census)
- Electorate: 29,852
- Major settlements: Maroon Town, Adelphi, John's Hall

Current constituency
- Created: 1976
- Party: Jamaica Labour Party
- Member of Parliament: Edmund Bartlett
- Electoral divisions: Rose Hall, Somerton, Spring Mount
- Returning officer: Berlin Roper
- Constituency number: 29

Saint James East Central is a parliamentary constituency represented in the House of Representatives of the Jamaican Parliament. It elects one Member of Parliament by the first past the post system of election. The constituency was first contested in the 1976 general election. The current MP is the Hon. Edmund Bartlett of the Jamaica Labour Party who has been in office since 2002.

== Boundaries ==
The constituency covers the Rose Hall, Somerton and Spring Mount electoral divisions in St. James.

== Demographics ==
According to the Jamaica Population Census of 2011, the number of persons living in the constituency was 36,689, while the number of registered voters was 24,826. As of the 2020 general election, the number of registered electors in the constituency was 29,852. This represents a 5.9% increase over the 28,178 voters registered for the 2016 general election.

Voter Distribution by Electoral Division
Electoral Division	Number of Polling Divisions	Number of electors
Rose Hall	29	11,843
Somerton	30	8,923
Spring Mount	30	9,068
Grand total	89	29,852

== Members of Parliament ==
Election	Member	Party
1976	Herbert Eldemire	Jamaica Labour Party
1980	Winston Spaulding	Jamaica Labour Party
1983	Geoffrey Roach	Jamaica Labour Party
1989	Violet Neilson	People's National Party
1993	Violet Neilson	People's National Party
1997	Violet Neilson	People's National Party
2002	Edmund Bartlett	Jamaica Labour Party
2007	Edmund Bartlett	Jamaica Labour Party
2011	Edmund Bartlett	Jamaica Labour Party
2016	Edmund Bartlett	Jamaica Labour Party
2020	Edmund Bartlett	Jamaica Labour Party

== Elections ==
=== Elections from 2000 to Present ===
General Election 2020: Saint James East Central
Party	Candidate	Votes	%	±%
JLP	Edmund Bartlett	7,338	69.6	▲11.2
PNP	Michael Hemmings	3,206	30.4	▼10.5
Turnout		10,544		
Registered electors				
JLP hold				

General Election 2016: Saint James East Central
Party	Candidate	Votes	%	±%
JLP	Edmund Bartlett	7,564	58.4	▲8.7
PNP	Noel Donaldson	5,292	40.9	▼7.4
Turnout		12,945	45.9	▼5.9
Registered electors		28,178		▲13.5
JLP hold				

General Election 2011: Saint James East Central
Party	Candidate	Votes	%	±%
JLP	Edmund Bartlett	6,382	49.7	▼5.5
PNP	Cedric Stewart	6,208	48.3	▲4.6
Independent	Roystan Richards	22	0.2	▼0.1
Turnout		12,848	51.8	▼8.7
Registered electors		24,826		▼1.2
JLP hold				

General Election 2007: Saint James East Central
Party	Candidate	Votes	%	±%
JLP	Edmund Bartlett	8,398	55.2	▲0.4
PNP	Donald Colomathi	6,637	43.7	▼0.6
Independent	Roystan Richards	42	0.3	
Turnout		15,205	60.5	▼3.6
Registered electors		25,130		▲38.2
JLP hold				

General Election 2002: Saint James East Central
Party	Candidate	Votes	%	±%
JLP	Edmund Bartlett	6,394	54.8	▲4.0
PNP	Donald Colomathi	5,170	44.3	▼0.5
NDM	Carnel Cameron	29	0.3	▼3.5
Turnout		11,667	64.1	▼5.9
Registered electors		18,191		▲10.6
JLP gain from PNP				

=== Elections from 1980 to 1999 ===
General Election 1997: Saint James East Central
Party	Candidate	Votes	%	±%
PNP	Violet Neilson	5,851	50.8	▼0.8
JLP	Edmund Bartlett	5,152	44.8	▼3.1
NDM	Robert Russell	435	3.8	
Turnout		11,512	70	▲1.3
Registered electors		16,443		▲28.3
PNP hold				

General Election 1993: Saint James East Central
Party	Candidate	Votes	%	±%
PNP	Violet Neilson	4,545	51.6	▼3.3
JLP	Godfrey Dyer	4,215	47.9	▲3.2
Turnout		8,803	68.7	▼10.1
Registered electors		12,813		▼1.9
PNP hold				

General Election 1989: Saint James East Central
Party	Candidate	Votes	%	±%
PNP	Violet Neilson	5,646	54.9	
JLP	Godfrey Dyer	4,598	44.7	▼42.1
Turnout		10,280	78.8	▲47.0
Registered electors		13,054		▲12.4
PNP gain from JLP				

General Election 1983: Saint James East Central
Party	Candidate	Votes	%	±%
JLP	Geoffrey Roach	3,202	86.8	▲23.5
independent (politician)	Matelan Dawkins	445	12.1	
Turnout		3,689	31.8	▼57.7
Registered electors		11,614		▲0.01
JLP hold				

General Election 1980: Saint James East Central
Party	Candidate	Votes	%	±%
JLP	Winston Spaulding	6,583	63.3	▲12.1
PNP	Edgar Watson	3,741	36.0	▼12.1
Turnout		10,396	89.5	▲2.9
Registered electors		11,613		▲7.3
JLP hold				

=== Elections from 1976 to 1979 ===
General Election 1976: Saint James East Central
Party	Candidate	Votes	%	±%
JLP	Herbert Eldemire	4,796	51.2	
PNP	Edgar Watson	4,508	48.1	
Turnout		9,366	86.6	
Registered electors		10,821		
JLP win (new seat)				

== See also ==
- Politics of Jamaica
- Elections in Jamaica
