= Julian Robinson (politician) =

Jamaican politician

Julian Robinson MP

MP for Saint Andrew South Eastern
- Incumbent
- Assumed office 29 December 2011
- Preceded by: Maxine Henry-Wilson

Personal details
- Party: People's National Party
- Education: University of the West Indies (BSc); University of Illinois (MBA)

Julian J. Robinson is a Jamaican People's National Party politician who has been Member of Parliament for Saint Andrew South Eastern since 2011. He is Opposition Spokesman on Finance in the Shadow Cabinet of Jamaica.
