= Saint Andrew North Eastern =

Parliamentary constituency of Jamaica

Coordinates: 18.0416°N 76.7519°W

Saint Andrew North East is a parliamentary constituency represented in the House of Representatives of the Jamaican Parliament. It elects one Member of Parliament MP by the first past the post system of election. The constituency consists of the areas of Barbican and Waterloo.

== Members of Parliament ==
Election	Member	Party
1989	Douglas Vaz	Jamaica Labour Party
1993	Karlene Kirlew-Robertson	People's National Party
1997	Delroy Chuck	Jamaica Labour Party
2002	Delroy Chuck	Jamaica Labour Party
2007	Delroy Chuck	Jamaica Labour Party
2011	Delroy Chuck	Jamaica Labour Party
2016	Delroy Chuck	Jamaica Labour Party
2020	Delroy Chuck	Jamaica Labour Party

== Electoral history ==
General Election 2007: Saint Andrew North East
Party	Candidate	Votes	%	±%
JLP	Delroy Chuck	5,764	67.3	
PNP	Hugh Thompson	2,814	32.7	
Total votes		8,578	100.0	
Turnout			59.19	
JLP hold				

General Election 2011: Saint Andrew North East
Party	Candidate	Votes	%	±%
JLP	Delroy Chuck	5,396	60.6	
PNP	Unknown	3,514	39.4	
Total votes		8,910	100.0	
Turnout			50.81	
JLP hold				
