= Marisa Dalrymple-Philibert =

Jamaican politician

The Honourable Marisa Dalrymple-Philibert CD MP
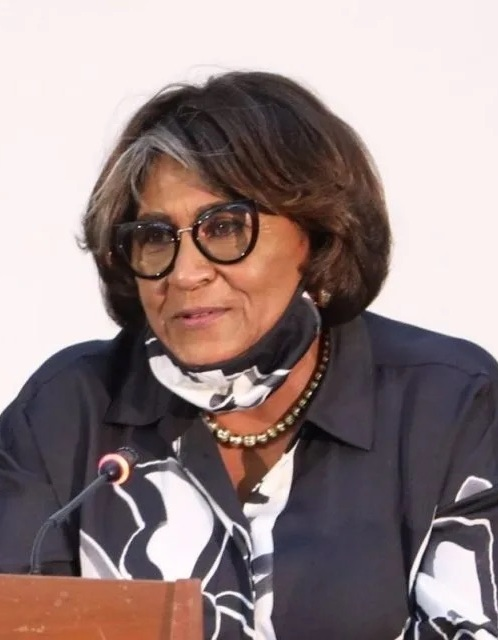

Minister of State in the Ministry of Justice
- Incumbent
- Assumed office Septemeber 2025
- Minister: Delroy Chuck

15th Speaker of the Jamaica House of Representatives
- In office 15 September 2020 – 21 September 2023
- Monarchs: Elizabeth II; Charles III
- Governor General: Sir Patrick Allen
- Prime Minister: Andrew Holness
- Preceded by: Pearnel Charles
- Succeeded by: Juliet Holness
- In office 13 July 2011 – 12 December 2011
- Monarch: Elizabeth II
- Prime Minister: Andrew Holness
- Preceded by: Delroy Chuck
- Succeeded by: Michael Peart

Member of Parliament for Trelawny Southern
- Incumbent
- Assumed office 2007

Personal details
- Born: Marisa Colleen Dalyrimple; 19 August 1956 (age 70) St. Ann, Colony of Jamaica, British Empire
- Party: Jamaica Labour Party
- Spouse: Sherold Philibert
- Children: 4
- Education: University of the West Indies (LLB)

Marisa Colleen Dalrymple-Philibert is a Jamaican attorney-at-law and politician, representing the Jamaica Labour Party (JLP). She was the 15th Speaker of the House of Representatives.

== Early life and education ==
Dalrymple-Philibert was born in 1956 in St. Ann, Jamaica. She attended Westwood High School, University of the West Indies at Cave Hill, Barbados, and the Norman Manley Law School.

== Political career ==
Dalrymple-Philibert first entered representational politics in 2007 when she won the general election from the Trelawny Southern constituency, polling 6,167 votes to Doneth Brown-Reid (4,570) of the People's National Party (PNP). She served as Deputy Speaker of the House of Representatives (2007-2011). On 12 July 2011, Dalrymple-Philibert was elected the 15th Speaker of the House of Representatives, succeeding Delroy Chuck, who had been appointed Minister of Justice. She became only the second woman to occupy this position after Violet Neilson of the PNP (1997-2003). Dalrymple-Philibert was re-elected to Parliament from the Trelawny Southern constituency in back-to-back general elections in 2011, 2016, and again in 2020. On 15 September 2020, Dalrymple-Philibert was once again elected Speaker of the House of Representatives, following the retirement of Pearnel Charles Sr. Dalrymple-Philibert resigned on 21 September 2023.

== Personal life ==
Dalrymple-Philibert is married to Sherold Philibert. The couple have four adult children.

== See also ==
- List of female members of the House of Representatives of Jamaica
- List of speakers of the House of Representatives of Jamaica
- Women in the House of Representatives of Jamaica
