= JUF =

Juf or JUF may refer to:

- Juf, Avers, Switzerland, the highest village with permanent residents in Switzerland and in Europe
- J.U.F. (album), a collaborative album by members of Gogol Bordello and Balkan Beat Box released in 2004
- Jamaica United Front, a former political party in Jamaica
- Jamaat Ul-Furquan, an Islamist splinter group of Khuddam ul-Islam banned under United Kingdom terrorism legislation
- Jamaat ul-Fuqra, a paramilitary organization of mostly African-American Muslims based in Pakistan and the United States
- Jewish United Fund, the central philanthropic address of Chicago's Jewish community and one of the largest not-for-profit social welfare institutions in Illinois
- Johnson University Florida, a university in Kissimmee, Florida
