= Maxine Henry-Wilson =

Jamaican educator and politician

The Honourable Maxine Henry-Wilson OJ CD

Minister of Education, Youth and Culture
- In office 2002–2007
- Monarch: Elizabeth II
- Governors General: Sir Howard Cooke, Sir Kenneth Hall
- Prime Minister: P. J. Patterson, Portia Simpson-Miller
- Preceded by: Burchell Whiteman
- Succeeded by: Andrew Holness

Personal details
- Born: Maxine Antoinette Henry; February 1, 1952 (age 74) Manchester, Colony of Jamaica, British Empire
- Party: People's National Party
- Children: 1
- Education: University of the West Indies, Rutgers University
- Awards: Order of Distinction (2018)

Maxine Antoinette Henry-Wilson, CD (born February 1, 1952) is a Jamaican educator and politician, representing the People's National Party (PNP). She served as Minister of Education from 2002 to 2007.

== Early life and education ==
Henry-Wilson was born on February 1, 1952, in Manchester, Jamaica. She attended the St Andrew High School for Girls, University of the West Indies and Rutgers University.

== Education career ==
Henry-Wilson holds a master’s degree in public administration from the University of the West Indies and a master’s degree in public policy from Rutgers University. She was a lecturer in public policy and public sector management at Mico University College, Church Teachers' College and the University of the West Indies. From 2012 to 2018, Henry-Wilson was Chief Executive Officer and Commissioner of the Jamaica Tertiary Education Commission.

== Political career ==
Henry-Wilson was first appointed to the Senate in 1992 from the PNP by then Prime Minister P.J. Patterson. She was Minister of State in the Office of the Prime Minister in 1992, and then as Minister of State in the Ministry of Finance in 1993. From 1994 to 2003, Henry-Wilson was general secretary of the PNP, succeeding Peter Phillips. She was simultaneously appointed Minister without portfolio in the Office of the Prime Minister. Between 1994 and 2002, she was Leader of Government Business in the Senate, and was appointed Minister of Information in the Office of the Prime Minister from 2000 to 2001. She was first elected to the House of Representatives from the Saint Andrew South Eastern constituency in the 2002 general election, polling 4,959 votes to 4,100 for Philip Henriques of the Jamaica Labour Party (JLP), and 127 for Peter Townsend of the National Democratic Movement (NDM). Henry-Wilson was subsequently appointed Minister of Education in the cabinet of P.J. Patterson, serving until 2007 in the administration of Portia Simpson-Miller, after the latter became prime minister in 2006. She held the constituency in the 2007 general election, receiving 5,187 votes to Joan Gordon-Webley of the JLP (4,618). Henry-Wilson retired from representational politics in 2011.

== Honours and awards ==
- Henry-Wilson was awarded the Order of Distinction, Commander Class in 2018.

== Personal life ==
Henry-Wilson is married to attorney-at-law Gladstone Wilson. She has one daughter, Seya.

== See also ==
- List of education ministers of Jamaica
- Women in the House of Representatives of Jamaica
- List of female members of the House of Representatives of Jamaica

Government offices
Preceded by Burchell Whiteman	Minister of Education; 2002-2007	Succeeded by Andrew Holness
Party political offices
Preceded by Peter Phillips	People's National Party General Secretary; 1994–2003	Succeeded by Burchell Whiteman
