= Karlene Kirlew-Robertson =

Jamaican politician

MP for Saint Andrew North Eastern
- In office 1993–1997
- Preceded by: Douglas Vaz
- Succeeded by: Delroy Chuck

Personal details
- Party: People's National Party

Karlene Kirlew-Robertson is a Jamaican politician.

== Political career ==
She was elected in the 1993 Jamaican general election. She was unseated in the 1997 Jamaican general election.

== See also ==
- List of female members of the House of Representatives of Jamaica
