= Tova Hamilton =

Jamaican politician

The Honourable Tova Hamilton MP

Minister of State in the Ministry of Tourism
- Incumbent
- Assumed office 2025
- Minister: Edmund Bartlett

MP for Trelawny Northern
- Incumbent
- Assumed office 3 September 2020
- Preceded by: Victor Wright

Personal details
- Born: November 2, 1983 (age 42) Montego Bay, Saint James Parish, Jamaica
- Party: Jamaica Labour Party
- Education: University of the West Indies; Norman Manley Law School

Tova Tané Hamilton is a Jamaican attorney-at-law and politician from the Labour Party. She was elected in 2020 as the MP for Trelawny Northern.
