= Michael Stewart (Jamaican politician) =

Jamaican politician

MP for Manchester Southern
- In office 2016–2020
- Preceded by: Michael Peart
- Succeeded by: Robert Chin

Personal details
- Party: People's National Party

Michael Stewart is a Jamaican politician from the People's National Party (PNP) who represented Manchester Southern in the Parliament of Jamaica.

== Career ==
Stewart is a former president of the Jamaica Teachers' Association (JTA). Stewart was elected in the 2016 Jamaican general election. In the 2020 Jamaican general election, he lost his seat to Robert Chin of the Jamaica Labour Party by 890 votes.
