= United People's Party (Jamaica) =

The United People's Party is a political party in Jamaica. It was started by Antoinette Haughton-Cardenas in 2001 and first contested national elections in 2002, but received only 548 votes and failed to win a seat. It did not contest any further elections.
