= Oliver Clue =

Jamaican politician

Horace Oliver Clue Sr. (born c. 1952) is a Jamaican politician.

Prior to his political career, Clue was a football coach.

Clue contested his first local election in Santa Cruz, Saint Elizabeth Parish in 1977, and lost. A member of the People's National Party, he secured a local government seat representing Gordon Town in 1990, then won four consecutive terms from Harbour View. Clue served on the Parliament of Jamaica from 1993 to 2002, as the representative of Saint Andrew East Rural. He returned to local government upon stepping down from the national House of Representatives, and retired from politics in 2016.

Clue's sons Horace Oliver Clue Jr. and Joshimar Olando Gray were charged with murder in 2008, along with two others. Legal action continued through 2017.
