= Joseph Hibbert (Jamaican politician) =

Jamaican politician

Joseph Hibbert (died June 15, 2013) was a Jamaican politician. He was MP for St. Andrew East Rural (2002–2011), and the Minister for Transport and Works.

== Death ==
Hibbert died of a heart attack on June 15, 2013, at the age of 65.
