= Cambridge, Jamaica =

Jamaican town

Coordinates: 18.311°N 77.901°W

Location of Cambridge in Jamaica

Cambridge is a town in Jamaica. It is the main township of the parish of St James, nestled in mountains, fifteen (15) miles south east of the City of Montego Bay and its hub is historic Wilmot Max Ramsay Square (Jamaica Gleaner, Thursday, 23 October 1986). Cambridge is located in the County of Cornwall. The chief "fruit-basket" of the parish, Cambridge is also the capital of the upper St James region.

Cambridge students go to traditional high schools—Cornwall College (boys), Mt Alvernia (girls) and Montego Bay High School for Girls—all sited in the City of Montego Bay, the St James Parish Capital. There are a Basic, an Infant, a Primary and a Secondary High Schools in Cambridge with "the proposed Marco Brown Public Library."

Cantabrigians worship at, primarily, but not limited to: the St Stephen's Anglican Church (State), St Mary's Catholic Church, Jehovah's Witnesses Kingdom Hall, Seventh Day Adventist Church, New Testament Church of God, Christian Fellowship Church, the Gospel Chapel, the Mt Reece Methodist Church and the Shortwood Baptist Church.
