= Glenmore Webley =

Jamaican politician

MP for Kingston East and Port Royal
- In office 1980–1983
- Preceded by: William Isaacs
- Succeeded by: Eric Anthony Abrahams

Personal details
- Born: 1951
- Died: May 26, 1987 (aged 35–36)
- Party: Jamaica Labour Party
- Spouse: Joan Gordon-Webley

Captain Glenmore A. Webley (died May 26, 1987) was a Jamaican politician.

== Biography ==
Webley was elected in the 1980 Jamaican general election. In 1987 he was found shot to death in his Fiat car on the road to Port Royal.

== Personal life ==
Webley was married to fellow MP Joan Gordon-Webley.
