= Farmers' Party (Jamaica) =

The Farmers' Party was a political party in Jamaica. It contested national elections in 1955, receiving 3% of the vote, but failed to win a seat. It did not contest any further national elections.
