= Imperial Ethiopian World Federation Incorporated Political Party =

Jamaican political party

The Imperial Ethiopian World Federation Incorporated Political Party is a political party in Jamaica. It was formed in 2002 by members of the Church of Haile Selassie I, a Rastafari order. It first contested national elections in 2002, when it received just 162 votes and failed to win a seat. In the 2007 elections it won only 192 votes and remained without parliamentary representation.
