= Republican Party (Jamaica) =

Defunct political party in Jamaica

The Republican Party was a political party in Jamaica. It first contested national elections in 1955, but received only 108 votes and failed to win a seat. It did not take part in elections in 1959 or 1962, but returned for the 1967 elections, in which it received only 45 votes. After failing to participate in the 1972, 1976 and 1980 elections it contested the 1983 elections, but received only 257 votes, again failing to win a seat. It did not contest any further elections.
