= United Party of Jamaica =

The United Party of Jamaica was a political party in Jamaica. It contested national elections in 1949, but received only 0.2% of the vote and failed to win a seat. It did not contest any further elections.
