= Jamaica Democratic Party =

The Jamaica Democratic Party was a political party in Jamaica. It contested national elections in 1944 when it received 4.0% of the vote, but failed to win a seat. It did not contest any further elections.
