= Jamaica We Party =

The Jamaica We Party was a political party in Jamaica. It first contested national elections in 1967, but received only 133 votes and failed to win a seat. It did not contest any further elections.
