= Dennis Meadows (politician) =

Jamaican politician

Government Senator (former)
- In office 2007–2011
- Constituency: Trelawny Northern

Personal details
- Born: 7 August 1966 Kingston, Jamaica
- Party: People's National Party
- Spouse: Angella Campbell Meadows
- Profession: ICT Consultant

Dennis Meadows is a Jamaican politician from the People's National Party (PNP). He is the PNP candidate for Trelawny Northern in the 2025 Jamaican general election.

== Career ==
Meadowsserved as Government Senator in the Upper House of the Parliament of Jamaica. He also served as the senate whip. Meadows is now co-covenor of the civil lobby group Citizens' Action for Principles and Integrity (CAPI) concerned with issues of human rights, public governance, integrity and accountability. He is also a justice of the peace and lay magistrate for the island of Jamaica.

He was born in Waterloo, St. Andrew, and was educated at New Day All-Age School, Ardenne High and the University of Technology, formerly College of Arts, Science and Technology (CAST), where he attained a diploma in business administration and bachelor's degree in computer science. He was a member of the Jamaica Labour Party and served as the party's deputy general secretary for the Area Council Four region. I addition, he served as Deputy Chair of the Party's Public Relations Committee of the Standing Committee, the third highest decision-making body of the Jamaica Labour Party (JLP).

He unsuccessfully contested the Trelwany Northern Constituency in the 2007, 2011 and 2016 general elections. The latter effort, he made in roads in the constituency by making the 30-year PNP stronghold a marginal seat by a 436 deficit. It is widely perceived that Meadows loyal and fierce support for former Leader of the JLP has earned a litany of political foes within the JLP, particularly after Golding's resignation as Leader of the Jamaica Labour and Prime minister. Meadows followed Bruce Golding in 1995 to form the National Democratice Movement (NDM) where he served in many roles including Deputy General Secretary and Opposition Spokesperson. Meadows followed Bruce Golding on his return to the JLP in 2002.

In 2013 the former Senator's decision to strongly support Audley Shaw against the incumbent leader Andrew Holness only accrued to him additional political foes within the JLP, which further alienated him from the Centre-Right Conservative Party. Further, his centrist, progressive and independent public interventions on many topical issues, only exacerbated his alienation. He is widely admired for his fearlessness and outspokenness on a litany of social justice issues, even if it means going against his own party. He often says, "I am not enslaved by my politics, rather, I'm compelled by conscience to defend the greater good.."

After a period of approximately seven years of political disengagement and estrangement from the JLP, Meadows resigned from the JLP and successfully sought membership in the opposition and Mark Golding led Centre-Left Social Democratic People's National Party (PNP).

Professionally, Meadows is an entrepreneur, ICT Consultant and the CEO of Express Computers Limited, an information technology consulting firm.
