= Robert Chin =

Jamaican politician

Robert Chin JP MP
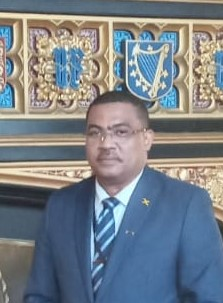

MP for Manchester Southern
- In office 7 September 2020 – 2025
- Preceded by: Michael Stewart
- Succeeded by: Peter Bunting

Personal details
- Born: 20 December 1971 (age 54)
- Party: Jamaica Labour Party

Robert Phillip Chin (born 20 December 1971) is a Jamaican politician. He has been a member of the Jamaica Labour Party since 2006 and is the Member of Parliament for the Manchester Southern constituency after defeating incumbent Michael Stewart in the General Election on 3rd September 2020.

He was defeated by Ian Ives in the party's internal elections in 2025, ending his tenure as the party's representative.

== Political career ==
Early in his political career he served on Management Teams in the Saint Andrew North Western, Portland Eastern and Kingston Eastern Constituencies.

He also served as a vice president and Deputy General Secretary for Generation 2000 (G2K) where he has been intimately involved in various political activities for the Party, which include but limited to, campaigning, polling, recruiting, public relations, workers training, research, fund raising, welfare and social activities.

=== 2016 General Election ===
He contested the 2016 General Election on the 25th February 2016 representing the Jamaica Labour Party in the Kingston Central Constituency, going up against the incumbent Ronald Thwaites. Thwaites tallied 5,190 votes to defeat Chin by 1,229 who tallied 3,961 votes.

=== 2020 General Election ===
In the 2020 Jamaican general election, he defeated the incumbent Michael Stewart to become Member of Parliament of Manchester Southern in what was considered to be a stronghold for the People's National Party. Chin tallied 6,826 (53.05%) votes to defeat Stewart by 890 votes or 6.91% who tallied 5,936 (46.14%) votes.
