= Michael Peart (politician) =

Jamaican politician

The Honourable Michael Peart MP

Speaker of the Jamaica House of Representatives
- In office 2003–2007
- Preceded by: Violet Neilson
- Succeeded by: Delroy Chuck
- In office 17 January 2012 – 5 February 2016
- Preceded by: Marisa Dalrymple-Philibert
- Succeeded by: Pearnel Charles

Member of the Jamaica House of Representatives
- In office 1993–2016
- Preceded by: Douglas Manley
- Succeeded by: Michael Stewart

Personal details
- Born: 1948 (age 77–78) London, England
- Occupation: Politician

Michael Peart (born 1948) is a Jamaican politician who was Speaker of House of Representatives. He was speaker in the House of Representatives from 2003 to 2007 and from January 17, 2012 – February 5, 2016.

He was a member of the House of Representatives from 1993 to 2016.

== See also ==
- List of speakers of the House of Representatives of Jamaica
