= Joan Chung =

Jamaican politician

MP
- In office 1983–1989

Personal details
- Party: Jamaica Labour Party

Joan Marie Chung was a Jamaican politician from the Jamaica Labour Party (JLP) who served as a one-term member of the Parliament of Jamaica. Chung was elected to the electoral district of St. Mary East Central, prior to her election she worked as a medical doctor.

== See also ==
- List of female members of the House of Representatives of Jamaica
