= Christian Conscience Movement =

Jamaican political party

The Christian Conscience Movement was a political party in Jamaica. It first contested national elections in 1983. The elections that year saw a mass boycott (turnout was just 2.7%) as the People's National Party protested against the government. The CCM received only 704 votes, which amounted to 2.7% of the total, and failed to win a seat. It did not contest any further elections.
