= Victor Wright =

Jamaican politician

MP for Trelawny Northern
- In office 2016–2020
- Preceded by: Patrick Atkinson
- Succeeded by: Tova Hamilton

Personal details
- Party: People's National Party

Victor Wright is a Jamaican politician from the People's National Party (PNP) who represented Trelawny Northern in the Parliament of Jamaica.

== Career ==
Wright was elected in the 2016 Jamaican general election. In the 2020 Jamaican general election, he lost his seat to Tova Hamilton of the Jamaica Labour Party by over 1,800 votes.
