= Delroy Chuck =

Jamaican lawyer, journalist and politician

The Honourable Delroy Chuck KC MP

Minister of Justice
- Incumbent
- Assumed office 11 January 2022
- Prime Minister: Andrew Holness
- Preceded by: Mark Golding
- In office July 2011 – 5 January 2012
- Prime Minister: Bruce Golding; Andrew Holness
- Preceded by: Dorothy Lightbourne
- Succeeded by: Mark Golding

Speaker of the Jamaica House of Representatives
- In office 27 September 2007 – 13 July 2011
- Prime Minister: Bruce Golding; Andrew Holness
- Preceded by: Michael Peart
- Succeeded by: Marisa Dalrymple-Philibert

Member of Parliament for Saint Andrew North Eastern
- Incumbent
- Assumed office 1997

Personal details
- Born: December 2, 1950 (age 75)
- Education: St Catherine's College, Oxford (BA, (BCL); University of the West Indies (BSc)

Delroy Hawmin Chuck KC born (2 December 1950) is a Jamaican lawyer, journalist and politician. He is currently (2016) the member of parliament for the constituency of Saint Andrew North Eastern and the Minister of Justice. Chuck previously served as the Minister of Justice from 2011 to 2012 and as the Speaker of the House of Representatives from 2007 to 2011. He joined the Jamaica Labour Party in 1995 and first contested St. Andrew North Eastern seat in 1997, an election in which he was victorious. He has held his seat ever since and won his fifth term in Parliament in 2016.

== Background and early life ==
Delroy Chuck is of Chinese ancestry, Delroy Chuck's birthplace is Christiana in the parish of Manchester, but he grew up in Clarendon.

== Education ==
He attended Ritchies Primary School, Clarendon, from 1955 to 1962, where he was successful in his Common Entrance Examination. He attended Kingston College from 1962 to 1969. During his tenure at Kingston College, he served as deputy head boy, president of Interact Club and was an active member of the chess and lawn tennis clubs and represented his school in both sports. He left Kingston College with five 'A' levels and a scholarship to University of the West Indies, where he earned a BSc (Hons) in special mathematics. In 1972, Chuck was elected the 1973 Jamaica's Rhodes Scholar and attended St Catherine's College, Oxford, from 1973 to 1976, where he studied Law and graduated with a B.A. in jurisprudence and a Bachelor of Civil Law degree.
