= Mount Alvernia High School (Jamaica) =

School in Montego Bay, Jamaica

Coordinates: 18.4785°N 77.9236°W

Mount Alvernia High School is a fee-paying high school for girls in Montego Bay, Saint James, Jamaica. It has over 1000 pupils.

== History ==
The school was established in 1925.

== Academics ==
The school expects all its pupils to attend university.

== Sports ==
In 2023, the school was successful in sports, and established scholarships to encourage student athletes to attend the school.

== Notable former pupils ==
- Staceyann Chin, spoken-word poet and LGBT rights political activist
