= Esme Grant =

Jamaican politician

The Honourable Esme Grant

Minister of Labour and National Insurance
- In office 1970–1972
- Monarch: Elizabeth II
- Prime Minister: Rt. Hon Edward Seaga

Personal details
- Born: 20 September 1920 Bluefields, Westmoreland Parish, Jamaica
- Died: 25 August 1987 (aged 66) Florida, United States
- Party: Jamaica Labour Party

Esme Melbro Grant (née Muir; 20 September 1920 – 25 August 1987) was a Jamaican politician. She was one of the first women elected to the Parliament of Jamaica.

== Political career ==
She was JLP candidate for Westmoreland Central in the 1962 Jamaican general election. She impressed the party leader that she was made the first female parliamentary secretary of independent Jamaica — working at the education ministry. In the 1967 general election she was elected in Westmoreland North Eastern but lost to Jim Thompson in the 1972 general election.

She was acting Minister of Labour and National Insurance in the 1970s. She resigned from the Senate of Jamaica in 1976.
