= Doreen Chen =

Jamaican politician

MP for Trelawny Southern
- In office 1997–2002
- Preceded by: Brascoe Lee
- Succeeded by: Devon McDaniel

Personal details
- Born: 16 September 1949 (age 76) Askenish, Hanover Parish, Colony of Jamaica
- Party: People's National Party

Doreen Chen (born 16 September 1949) is a Jamaican retired politician.

== Political career ==
On 11 October 2000, her political opponent Alfred Chen (of no relation) was killed in a helicopter crash.
