= Saint Mary Western =

Parliamentary constituency of Jamaica

Saint Mary West is number 40 on this map.

Saint Mary Western is a parliamentary constituency represented in the Parliament of Jamaica. It elects one Member of Parliament by the first past the post system of election. The constituency covers the west part of Saint Mary Parish.

== Representation ==
Election	Member	Party
1983	Hyacinth Knight	Jamaica Labour Party
2016	Robert Montague	Jamaica Labour Party
2020	Robert Montague	Jamaica Labour Party
