= Rose Leon =

Jamaican politician and businesswoman

The Honourable Rose Leon CD MP
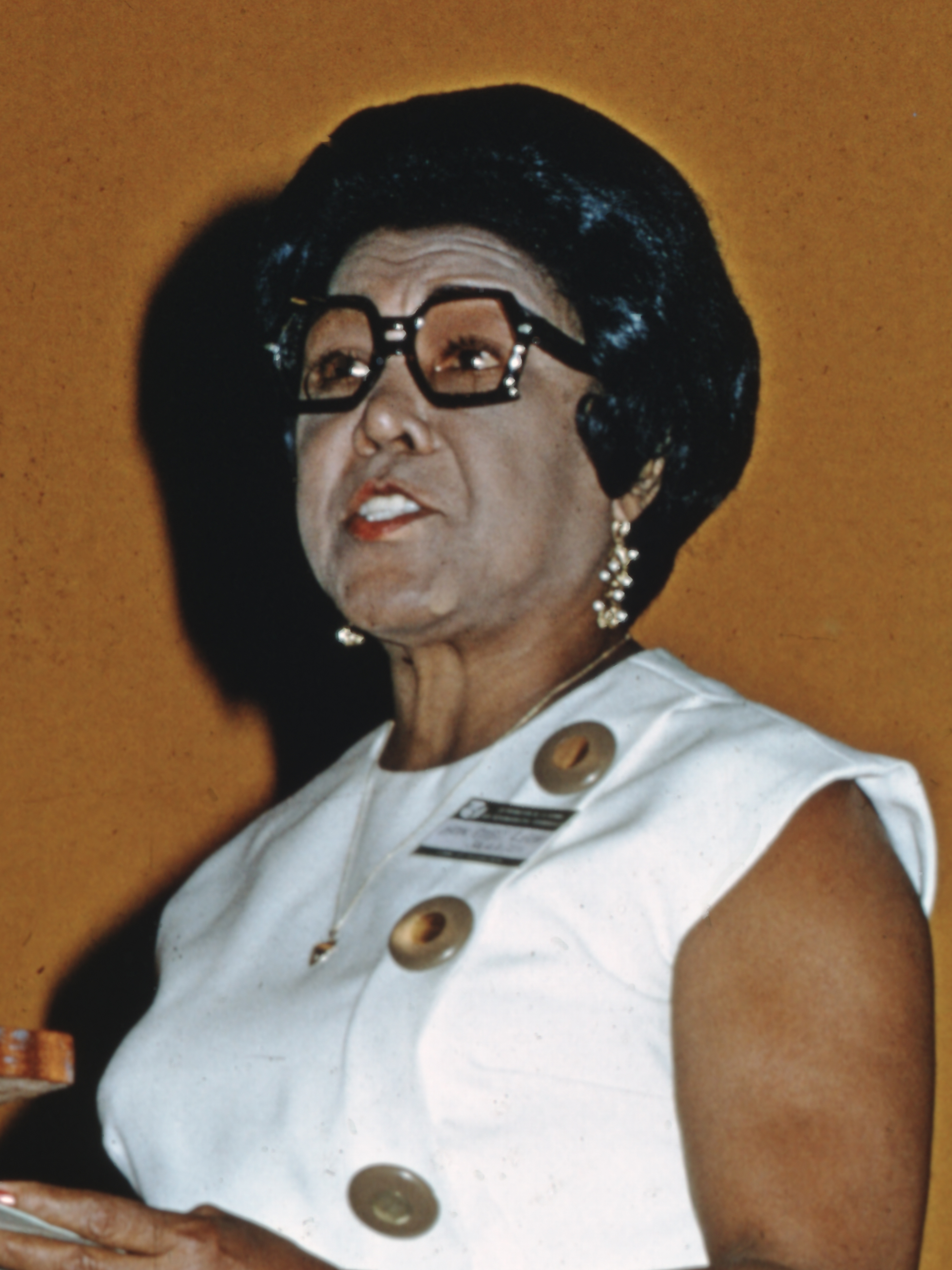
- Leon, 1976

Minister of Health
- In office 1953–1955

Minister of Local Government
- In office 1972–1976

Personal details
- Born: Rose Agatha Huie; October 20, 1913 Saint Ann, Jamaica
- Died: August 17, 1999 (aged 85) Kingston, Jamaica
- Party: Jamaica Labour Party
- Spouse: Arthur Alexander Leon
- Children: 2
- Education: Central Branch Elementary School; Wolmer’s Girls’ School

Rose Agatha Leon (20 October 1913 – 16 August 1999) was a Jamaican businesswoman and politician. In August 1999, she was murdered in her home.

== Biography ==
Leon was born Rose Agatha Huie to pharmacist Benjamin Joseph Huie and Adella Murray on 20 October 1911 in Saint Ann Parish. She was educated in the Central Branch Elementary School and Wolmer’s Girls' School, both in Jamaica, and later in New York City at the Abyssinian School of Cosmetic Chemistry. Leon was married to Arthur Alexander Leon in 1932; the couple had two children.

=== Politics ===
Leon first became politically active in the early 1940s, when she became a councilor for the Kingston and St. Andrew Corporation. From 1944 she was a member of the Jamaica Labour Party (JLP).

In 1948 she became chair of the Jamaica Labour Party, making her the first woman to chair a national political party. Leon held that position for 12 years. In 1949, she was elected into the Jamaica House of Representatives, and in 1953 was appointed minister of health and social welfare, holding that post until 1955. Leon held her seat in the 1955 elections, beating PNP candidate William Seivwright. In 1960 she left the JLP due to its lack of support for the Federation of the West Indies. Leon was not able to win re-election as an independent, and shortly afterwards joined the People's National Party. She returned to prominence in 1969, being elected as a local councillor, heading the local Roads and Works Committee from 1969 to 1972, and winning election in 1971 to a one year term as deputy mayor of Kingston. From 1972–1976 she was Minister of Local Government in the Manley government, and during the following four years was the special adviser to the minister of social security. In 1980, she retired from politics.

From 1951 to 1999 Leon was senior justice of the peace in St. Andrew.

=== Cosmetics business ===
Having returned to Jamaica from studying chemistry in the US, she founded the Leon School of Beauty Culture with her husband. She pioneered a line of locally made beauty products, providing an alternative to imports. Right up until her death, Leon taught at the school.

=== Awards and other work ===
Leon was involved in the foundation of the Jamaica Federation of Women in 1944, the Jamaica Manufacturers' Association in 1947, and advocated for the West Indies' Federation. She volunteered in several places. In 1956 Leon was given the Keys to the City of New York by John Lindsay, the mayor. Two years later she visited Liberia at the request of William Tubman, the nation's president. In 1982 she was made a Commander of the Order of Distinction. She also received various awards from other Jamaican groups.

== Killing ==
Leon was murdered in August 1999 by several robbers while in her home in Kingston, Jamaica. She was 85 years old. In the aftermath of her killing, numerous Jamaican politicians apologized for potentially fostering a climate that led to such killings occurring. Eric Anthony Abrahams, a former politician and radio show host, said, "We were part of the process...We are part of a failed state and as such we failed the country. With all the opportunity I had, I just slipped into the political system without really bucking it." Other politicians echoed his sentiments. In 2002 an annual lecture in her memory was created by the Jamaica Women's Political Caucus.

== See also ==
- Women in the House of Representatives of Jamaica
