= Enid Bennett (politician) =

Jamaican politician

The Honourable Enid Bennett OJ, CD

Minister of State, Ministry of Social Security
- In office 1984–1989
- Monarch: Elizabeth II
- Governor General: Sir Florizel Glasspole
- Prime Minister: Rt. Hon Edward Seaga

Minister of State, Ministry of Local Government
- In office 1980–1984
- Prime Minister: Rt. Hon Edward Seaga

Personal details
- Born: Enid Maude Bennett; 18 May 1931 Linstead, Jamaica
- Died: 22 December 2017 (aged 86) Linstead, Jamaica
- Party: Jamaica Labour Party
- Awards: Order of Jamaica (2012)

Enid Maude Bennett, OJ, CD (18 May 1931 – 22 December 2017) was a Jamaican politician, representing the Jamaica Labour Party (JLP), who served as Member of Parliament for 30 continuous years until her retirement in 1997.

== Early life and education ==
Bennett was born in Linstead, St. Catherine on 18 May 1931. She was the daughter of James Bennett and Margaret Gordon (née Nattoo). Bennett commenced her education at Linstead Primary School and later attended St. Helen Commercial School.

== Political career ==
Bennett was first elected Parish Councillor for the Sligoville electoral division in the 1956 Parish Council Elections, and later became Member of Parliament for Central St. Catherine in 1967, before moving to represent St. Catherine West Central in 1976. Bennett served as Minister of State in the Ministry of Local Government between 1980 and 1984, and Minister of State in the Ministry of Labour and Social Security between 1984 and 1989. She was elected the first deputy leader of the JLP in 1978, a post she held until 1999. In December 1997, at the end of her seventh term in office, Bennett retired from active politics at age 66, after 30 years and 10 months of continuous service as an elected Member of Parliament.

== Honours and awards ==
- Bennett was awarded Jamaica’s fourth-highest honour, the Order of Jamaica, in 2012.
- In 2018, Bog Walk High School in St. Catherine was renamed the Enid Bennett High School in her honour

== Personal life and death ==
Bennett died on 22 December 2017, at age 86 after a brief illness.

== See also ==
- Women in the House of Representatives of Jamaica
- List of female members of the House of Representatives of Jamaica
