= Westwood High School (Jamaica) =

School in Trelawny, Jamaica

Coordinates: 18.396°N 77.457°W

The Westwood High School is a school located in Stewart Town, Trelawny, Jamaica. It was founded in 1882 by Baptist Minister Reverend William Menzie Webb with the aim to provide unsegregated education for girls. The school also set up a board of trustees to represent the different Protestant denominations. It caters to secondary students and after 36 years reopened its sixth-form programme in 2014. Westwood is among the five boarding remaining in Jamaica and has been the only school to retain the tradition of wearing a jippi-jappa (Panama) hat.

Amy Ashwood Garvey, a Pan-Africanist activist and the first wife of Marcus Mosiah Garvey, was a student of the school. Iris Collins, the first woman elected to the House of Representatives, also attended the school. Gwendolyn Spencer, a nurse and midwife who co-founded the Jamaican Midwives' Association, also attended the school. Anne Walmsley, an editor, scholar, critic and author, taught at the school for three years.

In 2025, the school was damaged by Hurricane Melissa, with losses around J$300 million. Structures damaged included housing, the clinic, and classes.
