= Roy McGann =

Assassinated Jamaican politician

Member of the Parliament of Jamaica from St. Andrew Parish.
- In office December 15, 1976 – October 14, 1980
- Succeeded by: Joan Gordon-Webley

Personal details
- Born: 1934
- Died: October 14, 1980 (aged 45–46) Gordon Town Square
- Party: People's National Party (PNP)

Roy McGann (1934–1980) was the first government official killed in the history of Jamaica. He was a PNP politician serving as a member of the Parliament of Jamaica for St. Andrew parish. McGann was also the Deputy National Security Minister.

== Campaign and death ==
Roy McGann, a candidate from the People's National Party, was campaigning for reelection in the 1980 Jamaican general election. On October 13, at around 6 P.M., a large group of Jamaica Labour Party members began assembling at St. Andrew's Gordon Town Square. Tensions between the groups escalated when two busses of PNP members arrived at the Square before McGann, who arrived shortly after midnight. Local police were also involved, and "during an ensuing melee five persons were shot" including McGann, his bodyguard, two JLP supporters, and a PNP supporter. It was unclear who started the shooting or why either group had assembled in Gordon Town Square.

McCann died on October 14, 1980 roughly two weeks before the 1980 Jamaican general election on October 30. There had been political violence since the announcement by Prime Minister Michael Manley in February of early elections, which eventually claimed more than 800 lives. Fears were circulating of a communist takeover because of the support of the leftist Workers Party of Jamaica to the PNP.

McGann's replacement as a candidate was Lloyd 'Perry' Stultz, who lost to Joan Webley (née Gordon), a member of the PNP.

== See also ==
- Attempted assassination of Bob Marley
