= Jamaica United Front =

The Jamaica United Front was a small right-wing political party in Jamaica.

In 1980 the party proposed a national unity government of the Jamaica Labour Party and the People's National Party. Party leader Charles Johnson, who had been a member of the United States Army, serving in Vietnam and was running a security company in Kingston, was subsequently involved in an attempted coup on 23 June 1980. The coup was seen by the left as a plot by the CIA. Meanwhile, the Jamaican Labour Party (which had not been involved) saw it as an excuse to bring in troops from Cuba prior to elections. Johnson was acquitted in 1981 when a witness was judged to be unreliable.

The party contested one seat in the 1983 Jamaican general election. The elections that year saw a mass boycott (turnout was just 3%) as the People's National Party protested against the government. The JUF received only 144 votes and failed to win a seat. It did not contest any further elections.
