= Violet Neilson =

Jamaican politician (1931–2024)

The Honourable Violet Neilson CD MP

Speaker of the Jamaica House of Representatives
- In office 1997–2003
- Preceded by: Carl Marshall
- Succeeded by: Michael Peart

Member of the Jamaica House of Representatives
- In office 1989–1997

Personal details
- Born: July 16, 1931 Somerton, St. James, Jamaica
- Died: June 7, 2024 (aged 92)
- Education: Mico University College

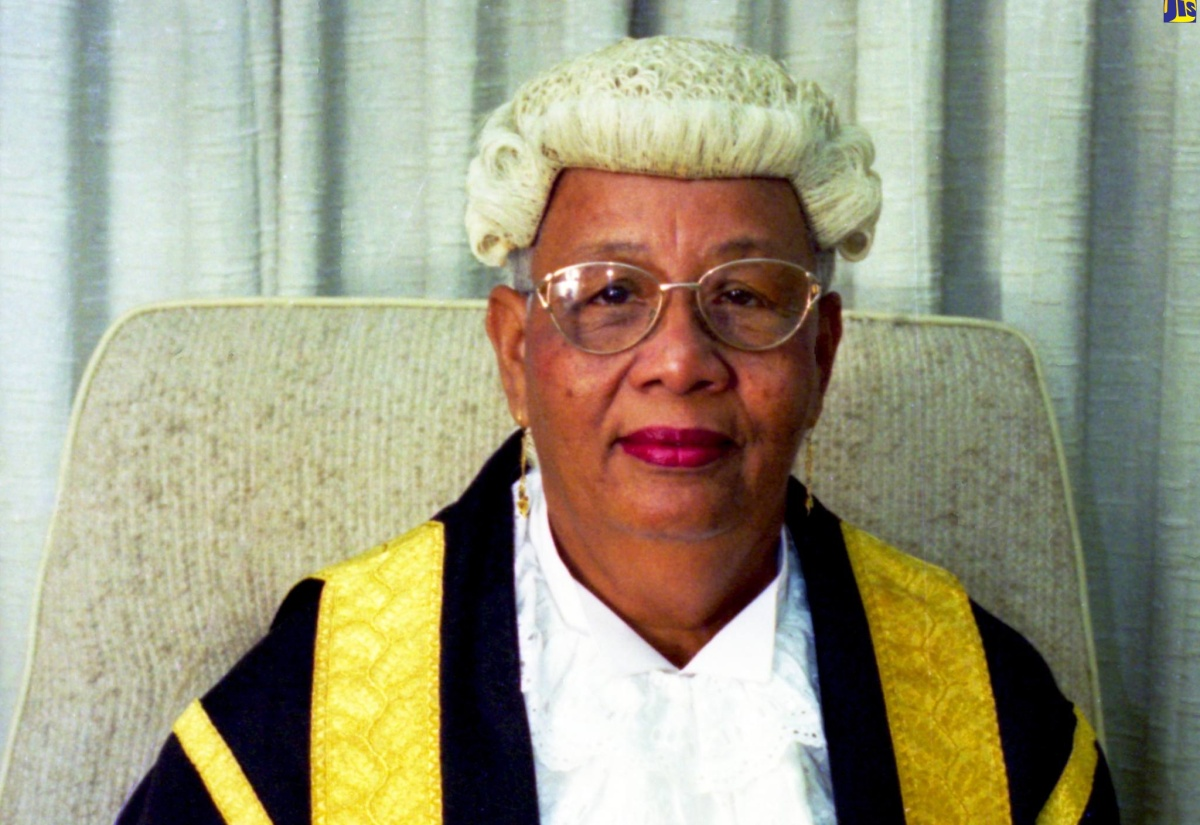
Violet Neilson, CD - Former Speaker of the House of Representatives of Jamaica.

Violet Neilson (16 July 1931 – 11 June 2024) was a Jamaican politician and teacher. A member of the People's National Party, she was the first female speaker in the House of Representatives and the first female president of the Jamaica Agricultural Society (JAS).

== Early life ==
Neilson was born in Somerton, St. James, Jamaica on 16 July 1931, to Caswell and Ellen (née Stewart). She was educated at the Mico Teachers' College in Kingston and returned to Somerton to become a teacher.

== Career ==
Neilson was a teacher for some nineteen years. She then worked as a secretary for South East St. James member of parliament Upton Robotham. She was Member of Parliament for Saint James East Central from 1989 to 1997.

In 1997, Mrs. Neilson was awarded the National Honour of the Order of Distinction in the rank of Commander (CD), in recognition of her outstanding contribution in the areas of Education, Agriculture and Community Service.

The late former parliamentarian also held the distinction of being the Jamaica Agricultural Society’s (JAS) first female President.

== Later life and death ==
After retiring from politics, she became an active volunteer at the Somerton United Church.

Neilson died on 11 June 2024, at the age of 92. Neilson left behind her daughter, Jacqueline Brodber and her granddaughters, Annakaye Brodber and Shevone Bulgin. Neilson was given a state funeral held at the Montego Bay Convention Centre, Rose Hall, St. James.

== See also ==
- List of speakers of the House of Representatives of Jamaica
- Women in the House of Representatives of Jamaica
