= Joan Gordon-Webley =

Jamaican politician

MP for Saint Andrew East Rural
- In office 1980–1989
- Preceded by: Roy McGann
- Succeeded by: E. G. G. Barrett

Personal details
- Party: People's National Party (since 2015)
- Other political affiliations: Jamaica Labour Party (until 2015)
- Spouse: Glenmore Webley
- Website: joangordonwebley.com

Joan Gordon-Webley (nee Webley) is a Jamaican politician. She has been a member of both houses of the Parliament of Jamaica.

== Early life ==
Joan Gordon-Webley was born in Pell River, Hanover Parish.

== Sporting career ==
She competed in Shot put at the 1966 Central American and Caribbean Games.

== Political career ==
In the 1980 Jamaican general election, she became the youngest woman to be elected to the House of Representatives, at the age of 28. Her opponent Roy McGann was killed.

She returned to politics in 2006 and contested Saint Andrew South Eastern. In the 2011 Jamaican general election, she stood in Saint Andrew East Rural and lost to Damion Crawford by just over 300 votes. In 2014, she joined the People's National Party. She stood in the 2020 Jamaican general election.

She stood in Saint Andrew West Rural at the 2025 Jamaican general election against Juliet Cuthbert-Flynn. She came in second place.

== Personal life ==
In 1982, she married Glenmore Webley. He was also an MP and died in 1987.

== See also ==
- List of female members of the House of Representatives of Jamaica
