= Iris Winnifred King =

Jamaican mayor (1910–2000)

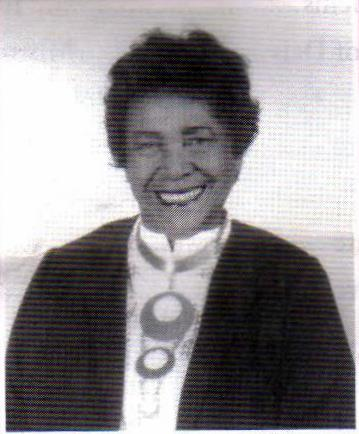
- Iris Winnifred King
- Born: 1910; Kingston, Jamaica
- Died: 2000 (aged 89–90); New York City, USA
- Occupation(s): First Black female Mayor, 1958

Iris Winnifred King née Ewart (1910–2000), was born in Kingston, Jamaica, West Indies, on September 5, 1910. She attended the Kingston Technical High School in Kingston and later the Roosevelt University in Chicago where she studied political science and public administration from 1951-'53.

In 1958–1959 she served as a mayor of Kingston and was the first woman in that function.
