= Carl Marshall =

Jamaican politician

Carl Marshall is a Jamaican politician. He was speaker in the Jamaican House of Representatives from 1993 to 1997.

== See also ==
- List of speakers of the House of Representatives of Jamaica
