= Douglas Manley =

Jamaican politician

The Honourable Douglas Manley OJ MP

Minister of Health
- In office 1977–1980
- Preceded by: Kenneth McNeill
- Succeeded by: Kenneth Baugh

MP for Manchester Southern
- In office 1972–1980
- In office 1989–1993

Personal details
- Born: Douglas Ralph Manley; May 30, 1922
- Died: July 26, 2013 (aged 91)
- Spouse: Carmen Lawrence
- Children: 2
- Parent(s): Norman Manley; Edna Manley
- Education: University of the West Indies; Colombia Munro College; University of Liverpool
- Occupation: Politician, athlete, educator

Douglas Ralph Manley (30 May 1922 – 26 July 2013) was a Jamaican politician, Member of Parliament (MP), and Government Minister. He was the son of Jamaican premier Norman Washington Manley and Edna Manley and the older brother of former Jamaican Prime Minister, Michael Manley.

Manley served as the MP for South Manchester, Jamaica from 1972 to 1980 and 1989 to 1993. Manley also served as a Minister of Youth and Community Development, Minister of Agriculture, and Minister of Health during the 1970s.

Douglas Manley attended St Andrew's Preparatory School and secondary school at Munro College. He obtained a bachelor's degree in sociology from Columbia University and a PhD in sociology from the University of Liverpool, England. Manley was a professor in Sociology at the University of the West Indies, Mona Campus.

Manley was also an athlete. In 1941, at Jamaica's inter-secondary schoolboys' track and field athletics championships, Manley equalled the record set by his father, Norman, in the 100 yard dash.

Manley was married to Carmen Lawrence, a Jamaican actress and playwright, and had two sons, Norman and Roy.

Manley was awarded the Order of Jamaica for service to his country.

Douglas Manley died on 26 July 2013 at the age of 91.
