= Edmund Bartlett =

Jamaican politician

The Honourable Edmund Bartlett OJ CD MP
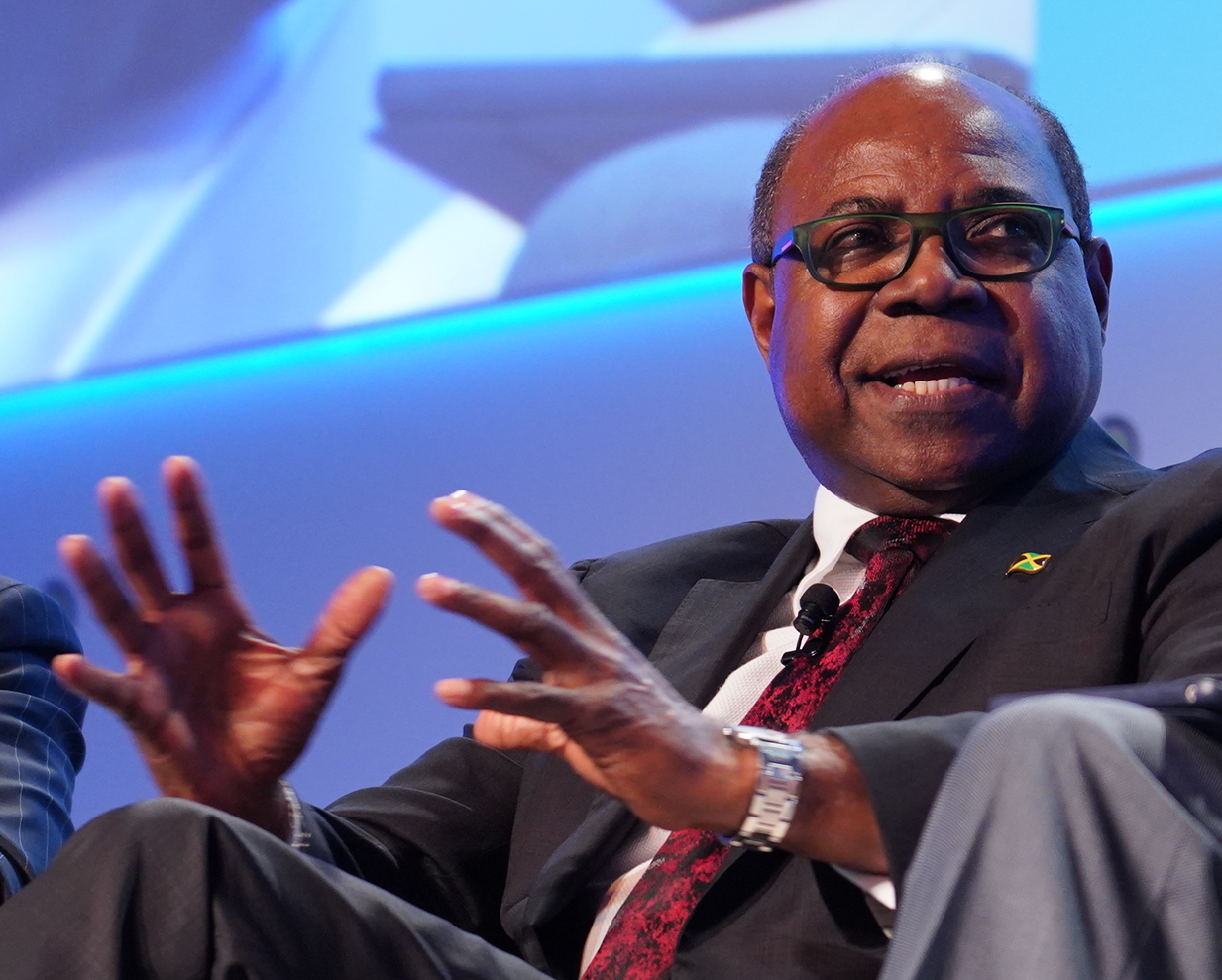
- Bartlett in 2018

Minister of Tourism and Entertainment
- Incumbent
- Assumed office February 2016
- Preceded by: Wykeham McNeill
- Prime Minister: Andrew Holness
- In office 2007–2011
- Prime Minister: Bruce Golding; Portia Simpson-Miller
- Succeeded by: Wykeham McNeill

MP for Saint James East Central
- Incumbent
- Assumed office 2002
- Preceded by: Violet Nielson

Personal details
- Born: Edmund Curtis Bartlett; December 3, 1950 (age 75)
- Spouse: Carmen Bartlett
- Children: approx. 3
- Education: University of the West Indies (BSc)

Edmund Curtis Bartlett (OD, OJ), is a Jamaican politician who is a Member of Parliament for Saint James East Central. He is currently the Minister of Tourism, having succeeded Wykeham McNeill when the Jamaica Labour Party won the 2016 general elections. Bartlett, a native of the parish of Westmoreland, Jamaica, was educated at St Elizabeth Technical High School, where he was Head Boy, and the University of the West Indies, Mona, where he studied sociology. He was first elected to the House of Representatives in 1980 and he has served as a minister in Jamaica Labour Party administration since before then. He became the youngest serving member of parliament in 1980.

== Personal life ==
His wife is Carmen A. Bartlett. They have two children. Their daughter, Lisa, died. Their son Edmund has a family of four: a wife Sarah, son William, and daughter Leia. Bartlett is a member of the Seventh-day Adventist Church.
