= Saint Catherine West Central =

Parliamentary constituency of Jamaica

Saint Catherine West Central is a parliamentary constituency represented in the House of Representatives of the Jamaican Parliament. It elects one Member of Parliament MP by the first past the post system of election.

== Members of Parliament ==
- Enid Bennett (1976 to 1997)
- Christopher Tufton (2016 to present)

== Boundaries ==
Constituency covers Red Hills, Bellvue and Point Hill.

General Election 2007: Saint Catherine West Central
Party	Candidate	Votes	%	±%
JLP	Kenneth Baugh	7,401	59.3	
PNP	Homer White	5,080	40.7	
Total votes		12,481	100.0	
Turnout			51.94	
JLP hold				
