= 1955 Jamaican general election =

1955 Jamaica general election
- 12 January 1955
- 32 seats in the House of Representatives; 16 seats needed for a majority
- Turnout: 65.11% (▼0.05pp)
Party	Leader	Vote %	Seats	+/–
PNP	Norman Manley	50.50	18	+5
JLP	Alexander Bustamante	39.03	14	−3
This lists parties that won seats. See the complete results below.
Results by constituency.
Chief minister before	Chief minister after
Alexander Bustamante; JLP	Norman Manley; PNP

General elections were held in Jamaica on 12 January 1955. The result was a victory for the People's National Party, which won 18 of the 32 seats. Voter turnout was 65%.

== Results ==
Party	Votes	%	Seats	+/–
People's National Party	245,750	50.50	18	+5
Jamaica Labour Party	189,929	39.03	14	–3
Farmers' Party	13,258	2.72	0	New
National Labour Party	6,004	1.23	0	New
People's Freedom Movement	647	0.13	0	New
Republican Party	108	0.02	0	New
Independents	30,948	6.36	0	–2
Total	486,644	100.00	32	0
Valid votes	486,644	98.18		
Invalid/blank votes	9,036	1.82		
Total votes	495,680	100.00		
Registered voters/turnout	761,238	65.11		
Source: Nohlen
