= 1944 Jamaican general election =

1944 Jamaica general election
- 12 December 1944
- 32 seats in the House of Representatives; 16 seats needed for a majority
- Turnout: 58.68%
Party	Leader	Vote %	Seats
JLP	Alexander Bustamante	41.44	22
PNP	Norman Manley	23.50	5
Independents	–	30.02	5
This lists parties that won seats. See the complete results below.
Results by constituency.

General elections were held in Jamaica on 12 December 1944. The result was a victory for the Jamaica Labour Party, which won 22 of the 32 seats. This was the first election held under universal adult suffrage. Voter turnout was 58.7%.

== Results ==
Party	Votes	%	Seats
Jamaica Labour Party	144,661	41.44	22
People's National Party	82,029	23.50	5
Jamaica Democratic Party	14,123	4.05	0
Other parties	3,500	1.00	0
Independents	104,814	30.02	5
Total	349,127	100.00	32
Valid votes	349,127	89.72	
Invalid/blank votes	39,982	10.28	
Total votes	389,109	100.00	
Registered voters/turnout	663,069	58.68	
Source: Nohlen
