= 1949 Jamaican general election =

1949 Jamaica general election
- 20 December 1949
- 32 seats in the House of Representatives; 16 seats needed for a majority
- Turnout: 65.16% (▲6.48pp)
Party	Leader	Vote %	Seats	+/–
PNP	Norman Manley	43.46	13	+8
JLP	Alexander Bustamante	42.71	17	−5
Independents	–	12.58	2	−3
This lists parties that won seats. See the complete results below.
Results by constituency.

General elections were held in Jamaica on 20 December 1949. Although the People's National Party received more votes, the Jamaica Labour Party won a majority of seats. Voter turnout was 65%. As of September 2020, this election was the last time an independent was elected to the legislature.

== Results ==
Party	Votes	%	Seats	+/–
People's National Party	203,048	43.46	13	+8
Jamaica Labour Party	199,538	42.71	17	–5
United Party of Jamaica	1,110	0.24	0	New
Other parties	4,693	1.00	0	0
Independents	58,790	12.58	2	–3
Total	467,179	100.00	32	0
Valid votes	467,179	97.92		
Invalid/blank votes	9,928	2.08		
Total votes	477,107	100.00		
Registered voters/turnout	732,217	65.16		
Source: Nohlen
