= 1983 Jamaican general election =

- 15 December 1983

All 60 seats in the House of Representatives 31 seats needed for a majority
- Turnout: 2.68% (▼84.23pp)
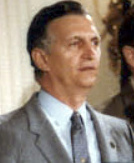
	First party
Leader	Edward Seaga
Party	JLP
Leader since	23 November 1974
Leader's seat	Kingston Western
Last election	58.88%, 51 seats
Seats won	60
Seat change	▲9
Popular vote	23,363
Percentage	89.67%
Swing	▲30.79pp
Prime Minister before election
Edward Seaga
JLP
Prime Minister after election
Edward Seaga
JLP

Early general elections were held in Jamaica on 15 December 1983. The elections were effectively ended as a contest when the main opposition party, the People's National Party, boycotted the election to protest the refusal of the ruling Jamaican Labour Party to update the electoral roll amid allegations of voter fraud.

Several minor parties participated in the election, but they only contested six of the 60 seats: with voter turnout of about 55%, this gave a nationwide figure of a meagre 3%. The Labour Party won all 60 seats in the House of Representatives, with their leader, Edward Seaga, continuing as Prime Minister.

== Background ==
The Labour Party had convincingly won the 1980 general election, taking 51 of the 60 seats in the House of Representatives. At the time, the party had promised to update the electoral roll, but failed to do so by the 1983 elections. On 25 November 1983, Seaga called early elections, two years before they were due. Seaga claimed that the move was due to People's National Party leader Michael Manley calling for him to resign from his post of Finance Minister (which he held in addition to being Prime Minister), and that the early elections would be a public vote of confidence in his austerity plans.

Whilst the People's National Party boycotted the elections and called for others to do so as well, three minor parties and several independents contested the elections. Two of the parties, the Christian Conscience Movement and the Jamaica United Front, had never previously contested an election. The other, the Republican Party, had run in the 1955 and 1967 elections, but had never received more than 108 votes. However, the opposition and independent candidates only contested six constituencies, resulting in Labour Party candidates winning 54 seats unopposed.

== Results ==
Although turnout in the contested seats was estimated to be around 55%, the overall total was just 3%, by far the lowest in the country's history and one of three occasions (the others being 2016 and 2020) it has been below 50%.

Party	Votes	%	Seats	+/–
Jamaica Labour Party	23,363	89.67	60	+7
Christian Conscience Movement	704	2.70	0	New
Republican Party	257	0.99	0	New
Jamaica United Front	144	0.55	0	New
Independents	1,587	6.09	0	0
Total	26,055	100.00	60	0
Valid votes	26,055	98.16		
Invalid/blank votes	488	1.84		
Total votes	26,543	100.00		
Registered voters/turnout	990,586	2.68		
Source: Nohlen

== Aftermath ==
The Labour Party government was sworn in on 19 December, and remained in power until the 1989 elections, in which the People's National Party won 45 of the 60 seats.

On 30 December Governor-General Florizel Glasspole appointed eight independent senators; Clarence Reid, Charles Sinclair, Emil George, Errol Miller, Lloyd Barnett, Courtney Lloyd Fletcher, Barbara Makeda Blake and Keith Worrell, who were recommended by Seaga.
