= 1967 Jamaican general election =

1967 Jamaica general election
| ← 1962 | 21 February 1967 | 1972 → |
- All 53 seats in the House of Representatives; 27 seats needed for a majority
- Turnout: 82.24% (▲9.36 pp)
| Party | Leader | Vote % | Seats | +/– |
|---|---|---|---|---|
| JLP | Donald Sangster | 50.65 | 33 | +7 |
| PNP | Norman Manley | 49.08 | 20 | +1 |
This lists parties that won seats. See the complete results below.
| Prime Minister before | Prime Minister after |
|---|---|
| Alexander Bustamante; JLP | Donald Sangster; JLP |

General elections were held in Jamaica on 21 February 1967. The result was a victory for the Jamaica Labour Party, which won 33 of the 53 seats. Voter turnout was 82%.

== Results ==
| Party | Votes | % | Seats | +/– |
|---|---|---|---|---|
| Jamaica Labour Party | 224,180 | 50.65 | 33 | +7 |
| People's National Party | 217,207 | 49.08 | 20 | +1 |
| Jamaica United Party | 163 | 0.04 | 0 | New |
| Jamaica We Party | 133 | 0.03 | 0 | New |
| Republican Party | 45 | 0.01 | 0 | New |
| Independents | 844 | 0.19 | 0 | 0 |
| Total | 442,572 | 100.00 | 53 | +8 |
| Valid votes | 442,572 | 99.05 | | |
| Invalid/blank votes | 4,243 | 0.95 | | |
| Total votes | 446,815 | 100.00 | | |
| Registered voters/turnout | 543,307 | 82.24 | | |
Source: Nohlen
