= 2002 Jamaican general election =

- 16 October 2002

All 60 seats in the House of Representatives 31 seats needed for a majority
- Turnout: 59.06% (▼6.16pp)
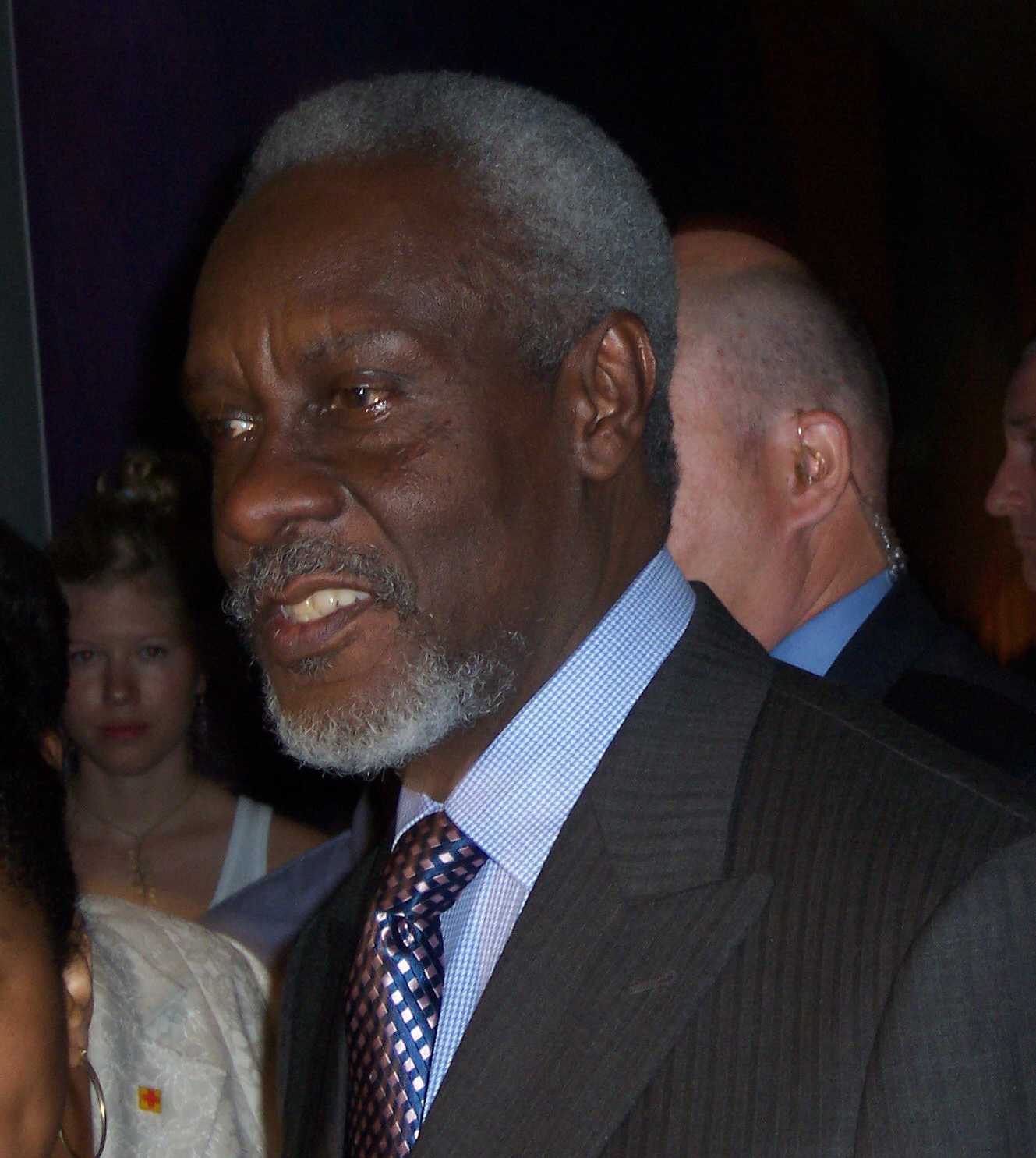

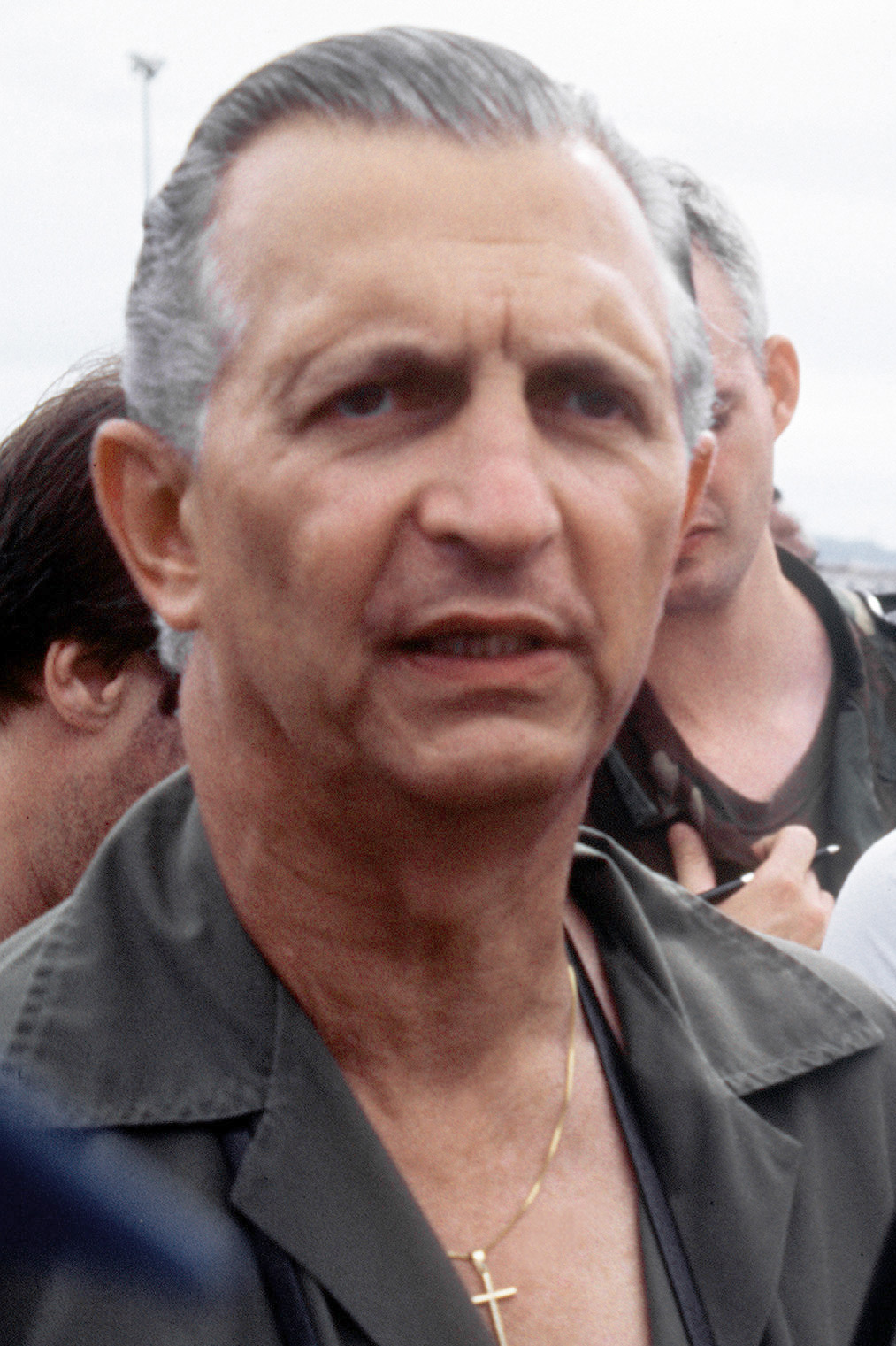
	First party	Second party
Leader	P.J. Patterson	Edward Seaga
Party	PNP	JLP
Last election	50	10
Seats won	34	26
Seat change	▼16	▲16
Popular vote	396,590	360,718
Percentage	52.09%	47.38%
Prime Minister before election
P.J. Patterson
PNP
Prime Minister after election
P.J. Patterson
PNP

General elections were held in Jamaica on 16 October 2002. The result was a victory for the People's National Party, which won 34 of the 60 seats, whilst voter turnout was 59%. PNP leader P. J. Patterson retained his position as Prime Minister, becoming the first political leader to win three successive elections. Patterson stepped down on 26 February 2006, and was replaced by Portia Simpson-Miller, Jamaica's first female prime minister.

== Results ==
Party	Votes	%	Seats	+/–
People's National Party	396,590	52.09	34	–16
Jamaica Labour Party	360,718	47.38	26	+16
National Democratic Movement–Jamaica National Alliance for Unity	2,895	0.38	0	0
United People's Party	548	0.07	0	New
Imperial Ethiopian World Federation Incorporated Political Party	162	0.02	0	New
Independents	452	0.06	0	0
Total	761,365	100.00	60	0
Valid votes	761,365	99.04		
Invalid/blank votes	7,393	0.96		
Total votes	768,758	100.00		
Registered voters/turnout	1,301,638	59.06		
Source: Nohlen
