= Anthony Spaulding =

Jamaican politician (1933–1998)

Minister of Housing
- In office 1972–1980
- Prime Minister: Michael Manley
- Preceded by: Wilton Hill
- Succeeded by: Bruce Golding

Member of Parliament for Saint Andrew Southern
- In office 1972–1983
- Preceded by: Eugene Condell Leonard Parkinson
- Succeeded by: Earl Spencer

Personal details
- Born: Anthony Michael Spaulding; 20 October 1934 Kingston, Jamaica
- Died: April 18, 1998 (aged 64) Kingston, Jamaica
- Party: People's National Party
- Spouse(s): Thrity Spaulding (1961 - ?), Bridget Casserly (1986 - his death)
- Children: Cyrus Frank Spaulding
- Education: Wolmer's Schools, Howard University, Inner Temple

Anthony Michael "Tony" Spaulding (20 October 1933 – 18 April 1998) was a Jamaican attorney-at-law and politician. A political firebrand, he served as a vice president of the People's National Party (PNP), member of Parliament of Jamaica for the Saint Andrew Southern constituency, and Minister of Housing under Prime Minister Michael Manley.

== Early life and education ==
Spaulding was born in Kingston in 1933 as the eldest son to family of would-be staunch PNP supporters. His father Frank Spaulding served three terms as Mayor of Kingston in the 1960s. His brother Winston Spaulding Q.C., is an attorney-at-law, and a member of the Jamaica Labor Party (JLP) who has served in several governmental capacities such as Member of Parliament, Minister of Justice, Minister of National Security and Attorney General.

In his youth, Spaulding attended Wolmer's Boys School and was a batsman for the cricket team. He then pursued a Bachelor of Arts degree on Liberal Arts at Howard University in Washington D.C.

During his time a Howard, Spaulding was especially active on campus. This is evidenced by his membership in the Eta Sigma Phi (National Classics Honor Society) fraternity, the International and Philosophy clubs. He also served as president of the Classics Club, vice president of the Caribbean Association, and appeared on the Dean's Honor Roll in 1956.

In 1958, Spaulding was selected to the Who's Who Among Students in American Universities and Colleges list, which recognizes distinguished individuals nominated from 700 colleges and universities. He graduated cum laude that same year.

After graduating from Howard, Spaulding was admitted to the bar at Inn's Temple. he returned to Jamaica in July 1961.

== Attorney-at-law ==
Spaulding practiced law occasionally with his mentor Dudley Thompson, representing clients as a criminal defence attorney. In April 1962, Spaulding appeared as counsel for boxer Ralph Stephenson also known as "Kid Ralph" and George Taylor who were charged jointly with attempted murder after an incident in which an upholsterer Granville Allen was shot. Allen testified that he came upon a political meeting on March 26 at the intersection of Harris and Georges street in Saint Andrew, when he was identified as a supporter of a rival political party. Allen was then hit with a stone and instructed to leave by a police corporal which he did. Allen also testified that the next morning he confronted the mother of the person who had accused him the day prior on Moore Street, and was afterwards shot at by Stephenson and Taylor when he went to his mother's home at Sparrow Street. Both Stephenson and Taylor were acquitted by an all-male jury in June 1962. Spaulding would later represent Stephenson on charges of manslaughter in a truck accident involving the death of two 8-year old boys.

In December 1966, Spaulding represented George "Feathermop" Spence who was acquitted of a charge of arson and rioting after the accused set fire to the West Lane business place of Louis Rashford in Kingston. Spence was a political enforcer for Spaulding and the PNP, and accompanied Prime Minister Manley on his historic trip to Cuba in July 1975 as part of an unofficial group. Spence was also a subject of an enquiry into overpayment of contracts by the Kingston and St. Andrew Corporation that same month. Spence was murdered at his shop in west Kingston on December 12, 1975.

In November 1967, Spaulding along with his brother Winston, served as defense counsel for Loban Campbell who was acquitted of the charge of fatally shooting Albert Brown in August 1966 on Chestnut Lane. Two witnesses testified that Winston "Burry Boy" Blake, who was later described as a political enforcer for the PNP, subdued the victim as he was shot, although the first witness stated that the given testimony was untrue after being shown her deposition by Spaulding. It was also suggested in court that the first witness resided in a house acquired through then Minister of Development and Welfare Edward Seaga.

== Political career ==
In January 1972, Spaulding led a demonstration at a proposed site for the Jones Town Sewerage Scheme. As the PNP's candidate for the South Saint Andrew constituency, he suggested that 40% of the work be given to PNP supporters, 40% to supporters of the JLP, and the remaining 20% to individuals who were not connected to either political party. Spaulding was officially nominated on 8 February 1972, and would go on beat Eugene C.L. Parkinson in an extremely close race which then triggered a magisterial recount. Spaulding received 3658 votes to Parkinson's 3556, end the latter's political career in the process. Upon conclusion of the magisterial recount in which Spaulding was declared the winner, he was named to Prime Minister Micheal Manley's cabinet as Minister of Housing.

=== Minister of Housing ===
In April 1972, Spaulding suggested the establishment of a National Housing Bank which would function to provide low cost mortgages funded by payroll deductions. This was in response to his view that the existing Jamaica Mortgage Bank did not serve the "priority social purpose" of funding low cost housing. This suggestion would lead to the establishment of the National Housing Trust (NHT) in 1976. Also in early 1972, he sought to acquire lands such as Hampstead Park Estate in St. Andrew and McIntyre in Brown's Town Central Kingston for National Development and as part of the Urban Renewal Programme. The first phase of development of the McIntyre Lands consisted of 111 units costing $900000 and was occupied in December 1974. Contracts were later signed in March 1975 for the second and third phases consisting of 316 units, a basic school, day care and a community centre at a cost of $3.1 million to be completed in December 1976.

Stating the intention to acquire Hampstead Park Estate during his maiden speech, Spaulding informed the House of Representatives that files related to the sales of the land to L.C. McKenzie by the Minister of Housing and Member of Parliament for the Saint Andrew South Western constituency Wilton Hill of the previous administration were missing. In May 1972, Hill sought a censure against Spaulding on the grounds that the current minister made previous statements and produced a Ministry Paper that was inaccurate or misleading, regarding the Hampstead Park lands. During the same session, the House approved two resolutions providing for the extension of the Independence City housing scheme in Portmore and for the establishment of the St. Catherine Mount Scheme in Montego Bay.

In another exchange with Hill later that month, Spaulding alluded to giving priority to individuals who had not been employed within the previous 10 years, for positions working on the resumption of the Sandy Gully improvement project which has been halted after the elections. Spaulding said that of the 1280 persons previously employed, only 21 had been re-employed and that a person who the Labour Party had not given a job in the last 10 years was easily identifiable because "You see them everywhere".

In June 1972, Spaulding said that he planned to write to Prime Minister Manley about the "tear-gas-like" fumes radiating from the Industrial Chemical Company (ICC) in Spanish Town. Residents reported fainting and the death of livestock as a result of the fumes. Although the issue fell under the purview of the then Minister of Health and Environmental Control Ken McNeill, Spaulding commented that he received criticism for referring to them (ICC) as "rapacious capitalists " and that he is "personally going to take the strongest possible course of action to see that they respect they health of the community".

On July 11, 1972, Spaulding outlined to the House of Representatives in his budget speech that the target of the Ministry of housing was to build 21000 housing units over the next five years at an average of 4000 per year. He also added that the displacement of individuals in slums created a "nomadic population" in the Corporate Area, and expressed his disappointment at the handling of the ministry by his predecessor with respect to issues such as surrounding the management of the housing fund, the signing of cheques, the hiring of individuals to fill non-existent vacancies among other things. As a result of the disagreement which had developed over the housing fund and Spaulding's view that there had been no serious effort to collect rent in the two years prior, effort was made to evict some tenants in Tivoli Gardens. Later in the speech the minister claimed emphasis would be placed on co-op housing for individuals of lower income levels, and that a certain percentage of housing in all schemes would be made available for policemen. He remarked that "if the old yardstick of profit and loss as it applied to housing was not changed, his job would be just as watching post...waiting and waiting until he too was seized by the people and placed before the Revolutionary Court and asked: 'Why did you not do more for me'".

In November 1972, there was a heated exchange in the House of Representatives between Spaulding and Minister of Parliament for Saint Thomas Western and former Minister of Trade and Industry Robert Lightbourne. Lightbourne who was also a parliamentarian in the West Indies Federation was making his contribution to the austerity debate when he exclaimed that the people should express their disinterest in Communism and that Minister Spaulding had sought links with communists with the expectation of gain. This resulted in Spaulding referring to Lightbourne as a "CIA agent in Jamaica", stupid and senile. Throughout the exchange, Spaulding also told Lightbourne several times to sit down and shut up before the speaker of the house Ripton MacPherson intervened. Spaulding then left the chamber upon conclusion of Lightbourne's presentation.

In early 1973, Tivoli Gardens was one of several areas selected by Ministry of Housing for eviction. Tivoli Gardens is located in the Kingston Western constituency and was developed in the 1960s by Edward Seaga and inhabited by individuals loyal to the JLP. Within several days of the repossession, new tenants had moved in to which Spaulding responded that the houses had been letted to individuals who had shown the ability to pay for them. The location and the circumstances surrounding the previously existing culture of consolidating power using government housing, led opposition minister of housing Hill, to express concern and note that Tivoli Gardens had the best record of payment in the corporate, that it was against previous government policy to evict individuals who always found it difficult or impossible to pay, and that Spaulding stated soon after taking office that he would never put people's belongings out on the sidewalk.

In May 1973, Spaulding announced that land had been acquired from the Anglican Church in order to provide 60 low-income housing units in Santa Cruz and Siloah in Saint Elizabeth Parish. Later on in that year, Spaulding announced the Popular Housing Programme for families with an income of less than $1200 per year to start in January 1974. This programme allocated $20 million from the World Bank for the development of 6000 units located in Kingston, Montego Bay and May Pen. Ground was also broken for the start of the construction of 28 two bedroom houses in Central Village in Saint Catherine Parish.

In August 1974, it was announced that ground would be broken for the development of the Braeton scheme in St. Catherine. The scheme would consist of 1000 two bedroom houses at a cost of $13500 requiring a 10 per cent down payment and serviced by the Jamaica mortgage bank. The development was a joint venture between the Ministry of Housing and Gore Tuca Investments Limited.

At the PNP Youth Organization's annual conference on 20 July 1975, Spaulding commented that there was no room for criminality in the struggle to correct the ills of the society and that politicians who criminal acts under the guise of politics "would have to go". He also remarked that "Those who opposed socialist progress should be eliminated", later clarifying that elimination did not mean a violent death, but through the consciousness of solidarity among the progressive forces". Spaulding then called on the "campus socialists" who were members Trevor Munroe's pro-Soviet Marxist-Leninist Workers' Liberation League (WLL), to stop disuniting the people over "who is more revolutionary than who". Spaulding also addressed the racial makeup of Gordon House in saying that it "must have a different complexion in five to eight years" and that "Youth man must be there. Old people have no everlasting tenor on leadership".

Two days later in the House of Representatives, Spaulding was questioned on the Allen Gardens housing scheme in Trout Hall, Clarendon by Edwin Allen, the JLP Member of Parliament for the Clarendon North West constituency. There were questions surrounding the approval process for the housing scheme which took applications in 1970 when the previous government was formed by the JLP. Allen contended that there was evidence suggesting that approvals were made on a political basis between 1974 and 1975 to which Spaulding replied that he was unaware. Allen also posed questions suggesting that unauthorized persons occupying houses after 1972 in the scheme were PNP supporters who had not paid deposits, that legitimate prospective applicants were turned away and told the forms were reserved for others and a number of male teenagers appeared at the scheme on 27 April 1975 to eject residents from certain houses. Spaulding replied that the date in question was a Sunday, a day on which evictions were not required to be carried out. Spaulding later referred Allen to this response when he was asked about the alleged theft of money carried out by the teenagers and the existence of a report that they were armed with a gun and knives.

Spaulding was cleared of complaints of political interference by the Director of Public Prosecutions (DPP) in September 1975. The complaints were filed by the Police Federation and made public in May 1975 at the 30th annual joint central conference of the organization, stemming from an incident on January 26 when a member of the Police Mobile Control questioned the rider of a motorcycle in Arnett Gardens. During the incident, Spaulding appeared with a group and said "Me no want to (expletive deleted) Police come and investigate anything here. Me in charge of the area and any investigation as must me". This quote however, did not appear in the complaint. Spaulding was cleared on the grounds that there was no allegation made that any police was obstructed, that there was no warning for prosecution or objection made on the police's part, and that it would be unfair to Spaulding to pursue this matter based on sweeping allegations made by Inspector Rainford Smart, the chairman of the Police Federation. Eli Matalon, then Minister of National Security and Justice, disclosed this to the House of Representatives on September 23 and further stated that the DPP's report completely lays to rest all rumours surrounding Mr. Spaulding.

In November 1975, Spaulding appeared as defence attorney for PNP General Secretary Dr. D.K. Duncan, who was charged with assaulting a woman constable, Maxine Malcolm of the Port Maria Police. Spaulding was seen with supporters as he arrived at the Port Maria Resident's Magistrate court house on 6 November 1975. A report was later submitted to the Commissioner of Police Basil Robinson by the Area 2 police regarding incidents of disorder by the large crowd which reportedly invaded the court house. On 22 November 1975, the Office of the Prime Minister issued a statement challenging press reports of a surrounding this situation. The statement indicated that the PNP executive arm and the cabinet ordered an investigation which found that there was no attempt to intimidate or interfere with the court. The statement went further to call the allegations that Spaulding and Duncan led a large mob to the courthouse with the aim of intimidating the court and preventing a fair trial of the case, totally false and mischievous.

In December 1975, Spaulding disclosed that construction of the Trench Town Sport Complex was to be undertaken by Clover Construction Company on a strict cost basis. The sports complex was to include football and cricket field, an Olympic sized swimming pool and tennis courts. The German government also contributed a set of weight lifting equipment.

On 17 February 1976, a statement released by then senator Pearnel Charles outlined the decision made by the Wilton Gardens' Citizens' Association to oppose any search of homes in Wilton Gardens as previously announced by Spaulding. Wilton Gardens is a more popularly known as Rema and was built during the previous JLP administration. Residents also outlined in the statement that they are willing to pay rent but are unable to do so since the Ministry of Housing's office had been relocated to neighbouring PNP stronghold Arnett Gardens a few months prior. They also shared that they would be seeking to pay at the Tivoli Gardens office to avoid problems with the ministry. The same day, Member of Parliament Edwin Allen tabled a motion calling for the revocation of Spaulding's ministerial appointment. This was on the basis of there being no denial by Spaulding of his intention to instruct the "PNP Watchmen Force" to search private homes in violation of the constitution. On 23 February, Spaulding stated in a letter to the editor that he would not encourage any action that led to heightened tensions in the area. He also stated that members of the PNP had agreed to a proposal at a constituency meeting, to have their homes, PNP headquarters and Group Homes searched by the Defence force and that no decision was made to undertake a wide scale search of every home. This is as they "all have reason to believe that the enemies of Socialism will deliberately frame the Comrades".

The JLP released a statement on February 27, condemning the February 24 attack on the house of a police constable. Constable Noel Stephens was the arresting constable and was expected to testify in a case to commence hours after the attack, against five defendants regarding a seizure of guns, ammunition and explosives at Spaulding's constituency office. The statement discounts Spaulding's condemnation of the attack and attempt to convince the public that no PNP supporters were involved. It also makes mention of the transfer of officers who are members of the Mobile Reserve to rural areas as punishment for protesting against political interference.

At the tenth annual of the Kingston Central Constituency held on 13 June 1976, Spaulding told the crowd that CIA was involved in attempts to destabilize the country. This is contrary to what Prime Minister Manley had told the crowd prior to Spaulding's arrival. Manley had also ordered pamphlets circulating in the crowd, accusing specific people of being involved in the destabilization attempts to be returned.
