= List of Jamaican high school football champions =

This is a list of Jamaica High School Football Champions, the champion high schools are winners of the football competitions that have been held in Jamaica. The first competitive games were played in 1909. The Manning Cup and Walker Cup are contested among schools in the Corporate Area (comprising the parishes of Kingston, St. Andrew and most of St. Catherine) while the DaCosta and Ben Francis Cups are contested by schools from the Rural Area (comprising all other 11 parishes including a few from Saint Catherine, e.g. Dinthill Technical). The Olivier Shield and Super Cup are contested by both Corporate and Rural Area schools with the Olivier Shield contested, in a home-and-away two-leg format, by the winners of the Manning & DaCosta Cups that season and is the last cup to be decided each season with the possibility of the title being shared if the scores were tied after two games. This format was changed by ISSA to a one-leg, play-to-finish format following the 2013 season which meant the title could no longer be shared. The Super Cup is contested by the top eight schools each from the Corporate and Rural Area, that season, in a one-leg knockout format with every first knockout round contested by a Rural Area versus Corporate Area school based on their rankings (top four in one Area are each drawn to play one of the bottom four in the other Area and vice versa). In 2018, the Flow Super Cup was renamed the ISSA Champions Cup after the initial sponsorship agreement ended with Flow. Jamaica College has won the Manning Cup more than any other team, winning the trophy 31 times.

== List of champions ==
=== Current competitions ===
The following table shows the lists of winners in the contested finals for the various competitions held.

Corporate area school
Rural area school
Shared title
No competition contested

List of Jamaican high school football champions in current competitions
Year	Manning Cup (since 1914)	Walker Cup (since 1961)	DaCosta Cup (since 1950)	Ben Francis Cup (since 1982)	Olivier Shield (since 1909)	FLOW Super Cup/ISSA Champions Cup (since 2014)
1909	Jamaica College				Jamaica College	
1910	Jamaica College				Jamaica College	
1911	no competition				Munro College (was Potsdam College)	
1912	St. George's College				St. George's College	
1913	Jamaica College				Jamaica College	
1914	Jamaica College				Munro College (was Potsdam College)	
1915	Jamaica College				Jamaica College	
1916	Jamaica College				Jamaica College	
1917	Jamaica College				Jamaica College	
1918	Jamaica College				Jamaica College	
1919	Jamaica College				Jamaica College & Munro College	
1920	St. George's College				St. George's College & Munro College	
1921	Jamaica College				Jamaica College	
1922	Jamaica College				Jamaica College	
1923	Wolmer's Boys				Munro College	
1924	Wolmer's Boys				Munro College	
1925	Wolmer's Boys				Munro College	
1926	Wolmer's Boys				Wolmer's Boys	
1927	St. George's College				Munro College	
1928	St. George's College				St. George's College	
1929	St. George's College				Cornwall College	
1930	Wolmer's Boys				Cornwall College	
1931	Wolmer's Boys				Cornwall College	
1932	St. George's College				Munro College	
1933	Jamaica College				Munro College	
1934	Jamaica College				Munro College	
1935	St. George's College				St. George's College	
1936	St. George's College				Munro College	
1937	St. George's College				St. George's College	
1938	Wolmer's Boys				Wolmer's Boys and Munro College	
1939	Wolmer's Boys				Munro College	
1940	Jamaica College				Cornwall College	
1941	Jamaica College				Munro College	
1942	Jamaica College				Jamaica College	
1943	Calabar High				Munro College	
1944 (Note: No competition due to World War II)	no competition				no competition	
1945	St. George's College				Munro College	
1946	Jamaica College				Jamaica College	
1947	St. George's College				St. George's College	
1948	St. George's College				St. George's College	
1949	Kingston College				Kingston College	
1950	Kingston College		Munro College		Munro College	
1951	Kingston College		Munro College		Munro College	
1952	Kingston College		Munro College		Kingston College	
1953	Excelsior High School		Cornwall College		Cornwall College	
1954 (Note: No competition held due to a polio outbreak.)	no competition		no competition		no competition	
1955	St. George's College		Cornwall College		Cornwall College	
1956	St. George's College		Cornwall College		St. George's College	
1957	Kingston College		Munro College		Kingston College	
1958	Kingston College		Cornwall College		Cornwall College	
1959	St. George's College		Cornwall College		St. George's College & Cornwall College	
1960 (Note: No competition held due to school violence.)	no competition		no competition		no competition	
1961	Jamaica College	St. George's College	Munro College		Jamaica College	
1962	Jamaica College	K.T.H.S.	Munro College		Jamaica College	
1963	Jamaica College	Kingston College	Cornwall College		Cornwall College	
1964	Kingston College	Kingston College	Munro College		Kingston College	
1965	Kingston College	Kingston College	Vere Technical		Kingston College	
1966 (Note: No competition held)	no competition	no competition	no competition		no competition	
1967	Kingston College	Excelsior	Vere Technical		Vere Technical	
1968	Jamaica College	Excelsior	Vere Technical		Vere Technical	
1969	Excelsior	Trench Town	Vere Technical		Vere Technical	
1970	Kingston College	Kingston College	Vere Technical		Vere Technical	
1971	Wolmer's Boys	Wolmer's Boys	Vere Technical		Wolmer's Boys	
1972 (Note: No competition held due to a shooting incident in Montego Bay.)	no competition	no competition	no competition		no competition	
1973	no competition	no competition	no competition		no competition	
1974	Jamaica College	Calabar High	ST.E.T.H.S.		Jamaica College	
1975	Kingston College	Kingston College	Vere Technical		Kingston College	
1976	Tivoli High	Wolmer's Boys	Vere Technical		Vere Technical	
1977	Calabar High	Kingston College	Clarendon College		Clarendon College	
1978	Camperdown High	Tivoli High	Clarendon College		Clarendon College & Camperdown	
1979	Camperdown High	Excelsior	Dinthill		Camperdown High	
1980	Excelsior	Excelsior	Vere Technical		Vere Technical	
1981	Kingston College	K.T.H.S.	Dinthill		Kingston College & Dinthill	
1982	Camperdown High	Camperdown High	Cornwall College	Vere Technical	Camperdown High	
1983	St. George's College	St. George's College	Cornwall College	Cornwall College	Cornwall College	
1984	St. George's College	St. George's College	Rusea's High	Cornwall College	St. George's College	
1985	Kingston College	St. George's College	Rusea's High	Rusea's High	Kingston College & Rusea's High	
1986	Kingston College	Meadowbrook	Herbert Morrison	St. Mary's College	Kingston College	
1987	ST.A.T.H.S.	Kingston College	Rusea's High	Rusea's High	ST.A.T.H.S.	
1988	Charlie Smith	Camperdown High	Herbert Morrison	Herbert Morrison	Charlie Smith	
1989	Excelsior	Meadowbrook	Rusea's High	Clarendon College	Rusea's High	
1990	Charlie Smith	Excelsior	Rusea's High	Clarendon College	Charlie Smith & Rusea's	
1991	Ardenne	St. George's College	Clarendon College	Cornwall College	Ardenne	
1992	St. George's College	St. George's College	Rusea's High	Rusea's High	Rusea's High	
1993	Excelsior High	St. George's College	Rusea's High	Glenmuir High	Excelsior High & Rusea's High	
1994	Wolmer's Boys	Tivoli High	Clarendon College	Glenmuir High	Wolmer's Boys	
1995	Charlie Smith	Charlie Smith	Cornwall College	Cornwall College	Charlie Smith	
1996	Norman Manley	Tivoli High	Clarendon College	Rusea's High	Norman Manley	
1997	no competition	no competition	no competition	no competition	no competition	
1998	Dunoon	Dunoon	Clarendon College	Clarendon College	Clarendon College & Dunoon	
1999	Tivoli High	Jonathan Grant	ST.E.T.H.S.	Glenmuir High	ST.E.T.H.S.	
2000	Norman Manley	Kingston College	Cornwall College	Cornwall College	Norman Manley	
2001	Bridgeport	Bridgeport	Cornwall College	Cornwall College	Cornwall College	
2002	Norman Manley	Charlie Smith	Rusea's High	Old Harbour	Rusea's High	
2003	Excelsior	St. Jago	Frome	Cornwall College	Excelsior & Frome	
2004	Excelsior	Excelsior	Glenmuir High	Glenmuir High	Glenmuir High	
2005	Calabar High	Tivoli High	Godfrey Stewart	Glenmuir High	Calabar High	
2006	Bridgeport	Eltham	Glenmuir High	Frome	Bridgeport & Glenmuir High	
2007	Jamaica College	Calabar High	Garvey Maceo High	Garvey Maceo High	Jamaica College	
2008	St. George's College	Excelsior	St. James High	St. James High	St. George's College	
2009	St. George's College	Jamaica College	ST.E.T.H.S.	Glenmuir High	St. George's College	
2010	Jamaica College	Jamaica College	Rusea's High	ST.E.T.H.S.	Jamaica College	
2011	St. George's College	St. George's College	Rusea's High	ST.E.T.H.S.	St. George's College	
2012	St. George's College	Wolmer's Boys	Glenmuir High	ST.E.T.H.S.	St. George's College	
2013	Jamaica College	Wolmer's Boys	ST.E.T.H.S.	ST.E.T.H.S.	Jamaica College	
2014	Jamaica College	St. George's College	Clarendon College	ST.E.T.H.S.	Jamaica College	Jamaica College
2015	Jamaica College	Wolmer's Boys	ST.E.T.H.S.	ST.E.T.H.S.	Jamaica College	St. George's College
2016	Jamaica College	Kingston College	Cornwall College	Lennon High	Jamaica College	Wolmer's Boys
2017	Jamaica College	Jamaica College	Rusea's High	Clarendon College	Jamaica College	Kingston College
2018	Kingston College	Hydel High	Clarendon College	Charlemont High	Clarendon College	Cornwall College
2019	Jamaica College	St. Catherine High	Clarendon College	B.B. Coke High	Clarendon College	Kingston College
2020 (Note: No competition due to the COVID-19 pandemic)	no competition	no competition	no competition	no competition	no competition	no competition
2021	Kingston College	St. Catherine High	Garvey Maceo High	Edwin Allen High	Kingston College	Clarendon College
2022	Jamaica College	Tivoli High	Clarendon College	Glemuir High	Clarendon College	Jamaica College
2023	Mona High	Jamaica College	Clarendon College	McGrath High	Clarendon College	Glenmuir High
2024	Kingston College	Mona High	Garvey Maceo High	ST.E.T.H.S.	Kingston College	Glenmuir High
2025	Excelsior	St. Catherine High	ST.E.T.H.S	Clarendon College	Excelsior	no competition

=== Past competitions ===
List of Jamaican high school football champions in past competitions
Year	Nutrament Shield (ended 1987)
1983	St. George's College
1985	Rusea's High
1986	Meadowbrook High
1987	Rusea's High

The Nutrament Shield was played between the Champions of the Walker Cup and the Ben Francis Knock Out Competitions. The Nutrament Shield was contested for only four years in 1983, 1985, 1986 and 1987.

== Competition team rankings ==
=== Urban area ===
List of urban area champions
Rank	Champion Schools	Manning Cup	Walker Cup	Total
1	Jamaica College	31	4	35
2	St. George's College	22	9	31
3	Kingston College	17	10	27
4	Wolmer’s Boys	10	5	15
5	Excelsior	8	7	15
6	Tivoli High	2	4	6
7	Calabar High	3	2	5
7	Charlie Smith	3	2	5
7	Camperdown High	3	2	5
8	Norman Manley High	3	0	3
9	Bridgeport High	2	1	3
10	St. Catherine High	0	3	3
11	Dunoon Technical High	1	1	2
12	Meadowbrook	0	2	2
12	K.T.H.S.	0	2	2
12	Mona High School	1	1	2
13	Ardenne High	1	0	1
14	S.T.A.T.H.S	1	0	1
15	Jonathan Grant High	0	1	1
15	Trench Town High	0	1	1
16	St. Jago High	0	1	1
16	Hydel High	0	1	1

=== Rural area ===
List of rural area champions
Rank	Champion Schools	Dacosta Cup	Ben Francis Cup	Total
1	Cornwall College	12	7	19
2	Rusea’s High School	11	4	15
3	Clarendon College	10	5	15
4	ST.E.T.H.S.	6	7	13
5	Vere Technical	9	1	10
6	Glenmuir High	3	7	10
7	Munro College	7	0	7
8	Herbert Morrison	2	2	4
9	Garvey Maceo	3	1	4
10	Dinthill	2	0	2
11	Frome	1	1	2
11	St. James High	1	1	2
12	Old Harbour	0	1	1
12	Charlemont High	0	1	1
12	Lennon High	0	1	1
12	St. Mary's College	0	1	1
12	B. B. Coke	0	1	1

=== Olivier Shield and Flow Super Cup/ISSA Champions Cup competitions ===
Olivier Shield and Flow Super Cup/ISSA Champions Cup competitions
Rank	Champion Schools	Olivier Shield	Flow Super Cup/ISSA Champions Cup	Total
1	Jamaica College	21	2	23
2	Munro College	19	0	19
3	St. George's College	14	1	15
5	Cornwall College	11	1	12
4	Kingston College	11	2	13
6	Vere Technical	6	0	6
7	Wolmer’s Boys	4	1	5
7	Clarendon College	5	1	5
8	Rusea's High School	3	0	3
8	Glenmuir High	2	1	3
9	Excelsior	2	0	2
9	Charlie Smith	2	0	2
9	Norman Manley	2	0	2
10	ST.E.T.H.S	1	0	1
10	Calabar High	1	0	1
10	Bridgeport	1	0	1
10	Dunoon	1	0	1
10	Dinthill	1	0	1
10	Ardenne	1	0	1
10	S.T.A.T.H.S	1	0	1

== See also ==
- Manning Cup
