= Tacius Golding =

Jamaican politician (1900–1995)

The Honourable Tacius Golding OD JP

Speaker of the Jamaica House of Representatives
- In office 1962–1967
- Preceded by: Burnet Birthwright Coke
- Succeeded by: Eugene Condell Leonard Parkinson

Personal details
- Born: Tacius Nathaniel Golding; November 8, 1900 St Catherine, Jamaica
- Died: October 6, 1995 (aged 94)
- Spouse: Enid Bent (m. 1943)
- Relations: Sherene Golding Campbell (granddaughter)
- Children: Bruce Golding (son)

Tacius Nathaniel Golding (8 November 1900 – 6 October 1995) was a Jamaican politician who served as Speaker of the House of Representatives of Jamaica from 1962 to 1967.

== Personal life ==
Golding was born in Bellas Gate, a community in St Catherine parish, Jamaica. His son, Bruce, served as Prime Minister of Jamaica from 2007 to 2011.

== Political career ==
Golding, a member of the Jamaica Labour Party, was elected to the House of Representatives in 1949 and served until 1972. He served as its Speaker from 1962 to 1967.

== See also ==
- List of speakers of the House of Representatives of Jamaica
