= Mavis Gilmour =

Jamaican politician

The Honourable, Dr. Mavis Gwendolyn Gilmour-Petersen OJ CD

Minister of Social Security and Consumer Affairs
- In office 1986–1989
- Monarch: Elizabeth II
- Governor General: Sir Florizel Glasspole
- Prime Minister: Edward Seaga
- Preceded by: Neville Gallimore
- Succeeded by: Portia Simpson-Miller

Minister of Education
- In office 1980–1986
- Prime Minister: Edward Seaga
- Preceded by: Phyllis MacPherson-Russell
- Succeeded by: Neville Gallimore

Personal details
- Born: Mavis Gwendolyn Gilmour; 13 April 1926 (age 100) St. Elizabeth, Colony of Jamaica, British Empire
- Party: Jamaica Labour Party
- Education: Howard University
- Awards: Order of Jamaica (2009)

Mavis Gwendolyn Gilmour-Petersen, OJ, CD (born 13 April 1926) is a Jamaican medical practitioner and politician, representing the Jamaica Labour Party (JLP). She served as Minister of Education from 1980 to 1986. Gilmour-Petersen turned 100 years old in 2026.

== Early life and education ==
Gilmour-Petersen was born on 13 April 1926, in St Elizabeth. She is the daughter of Isaac and Adelaide Holness. Gilmour-Petersen attended Blake's Tutorial College; Howard University in Washington, D.C., and the University of Edinburgh, Scotland.

== Medical career ==
Gilmour-Petersen graduated from Howard University College of Medicine in 1951. She then served at a number of hospitals in Jamaica and the Cayman Islands. In 1959 she embarked on her Fellowship of the Royal College of Surgeons in Edinburgh. Upon completion, she was appointed Consultant Surgeon at the Kingston Public Hospital (KPH) and become the first woman surgeon in the Caribbean, serving the KPH from 1960 to 1976.

== Political career ==
Gilmour-Petersen entered elective politics in 1976 and won the St. Andrew West Rural constituency which she held until 1989. As a member of Edward Seaga's Cabinet, she served as minister of education from 1980 to 1986 when she was replaced by Neville Gallimore. She then served as Minister of Social Security and Consumer Affairs from 1986 to 1989.

== Honours and awards ==
- Gilmour-Petersen was awarded the Order of Distinction, Commander Class in 2004.
- She was awarded Jamaica’s fourth-highest honour, the Order of Jamaica, in 2009.

== See also ==
- List of education ministers of Jamaica
- Women in the House of Representatives of Jamaica
- List of female members of the House of Representatives of Jamaica

Government offices
Preceded by Neville Gallimore	Minister of Social Security and Consumer Affairs; 1986–1989	Succeeded by Portia Simpson-Miller
Preceded by Phyllis MacPherson-Russell	Minister of Education; 1980–1986	Succeeded by Neville Gallimore
