= Goretti =

Goretti is both a feminine given name and an Italian surname. Notable people with the surname include:

== Surname ==
- Ajilo Elogu Maria Goretti (born 1963), Ugandan politician and legislator.
- Beatrice Ancillotti Goretti (1879–1937), Italian painter
- Maria Goretti (1890–1902), Italian virgin-martyr of the Roman Catholic Church
- Maria Goretti (actress), Indian VJ and actress
- Martino Goretti (born 1985), Italian rower
- Sergio Goretti (1929-2012), Italian Catholic bishop
- Roberto Goretti (born 1976), Italian footballer
- Vittorio Goretti (1939–2016), Italian amateur astronomer

== Given name ==
- Goretti Angolikin (born 1986), Ugandan chess player
- Goretti Chadwick, Samoan-New Zealand actress, writer, director and tutor
- Goretti Donaire, Spanish football player
- Goretti Horgan, Irish socialist activist and lecturer
- Goretti Kyomuhendo (born 1965), Ugandan novelist and literary activist
- Goretti Masadde, chief executive officer of the Uganda Institute of Banking and Financial Services
- Goretti Nassanga, Ugandan journalist, academic and academic administrator
- Goretti Zumaya (born 1997), Mexican sports shooter

== See also ==
- Storm Goretti, in Europe in January 2026
