= List of education ministers of Jamaica =

The following is a list of education ministers of Jamaica since adult suffrage (1944).

1. Jehoida McPherson (1945–1949)
2. Joseph Malcolm (1950–1951)
3. L. L. Simmonds (1951–1953)
4. Edwin Allen (1953–1955)
5. Ivan Lloyd (1955–1957)
6. Florizel Glasspole (1957–1962)
7. Edwin Allen (1962–1972)
8. Florizel Glasspole (1972–1973)
9. Eli Matalon (1973–1974)
10. Howard Cooke (1974–1977)
11. Eric Bell (1977–1978)
12. Phyllis MacPherson-Russell (1978–1980)
13. Mavis Gilmour (1980–1986)
14. Neville Gallimore (1986–1989)
15. Carlyle Dunkley (1989–1992)
16. Burchell Whiteman (1992–2002)
17. Maxine Henry-Wilson (2002–2007)
18. Andrew Holness (2007–2012)
19. Ronald Thwaites (2012–2016)
20. Ruel Reid (2016–2019)
21. Karl Samuda (2019–2020)
22. Fayval Williams (2020–2024)
23. Dana Morris Dixon (2024-)

== See also ==
- Cabinet of Jamaica
- Ministries and agencies of the Jamaican government
