= Felix Veitch =

Jamaican minister (1887–1946)

The Reverend, Dr Felix Gordon Veitch M.D., OBE

Speaker of the House of Representatives
- In office 1945–1946
- Monarch: George VI
- Governor: Sir John Higgins
- Succeeded by: Clement Aitcheson

Personal details
- Born: 1887 St Ann, Colony of Jamaica, British Empire
- Died: July 4, 1946 (aged 58–59)
- Party: Jamaica Labour Party
- Spouse: Gladys (née Edwards)

Felix Gordon Veitch (1887 – July 4, 1946) was a Jamaican Baptist minister, medical practitioner and politician, representing first the Peoples Political Party founded by Marcus Garvey before serving as an independent and then later for the Jamaica Labour Party (JLP) in pre-independent Jamaica. He served as the first speaker of the House of Representatives (1945-1946).

== Early life and education ==
Veitch was born in 1887 in St Ann, Jamaica. He was the son of agriculturist James Veitch and his wife Elsie Jane Gordon.

== Political career ==
Prior to the granting of adult suffrage in 1944, Veitch was a member of the former Legislative Council, representing the parish of Hanover between 1929 and 1944. He was the only member of the Marcus Garvey led Peoples Political Party to win a seat in the 1929 election where one member per parish was elected to the Legislative Council. By the December 14, 1944 general election, he represented the Alexander Bustamante-led Jamaica Labour Party. Veitch was elected to the House of Representatives from the constituency of Hanover Western, polling 3,200 votes in a crowded field against independents William Dickson (2,421), Walter Tomlinson (1,273), Henry Messam (1,196), and others. A staggering 920 ballots were rejected.

On January 9, 1945, when the House first convened, Veitch was nominated to the position of Speaker by Jehoida McPherson. He was duly confirmed in this position and became the first Speaker of the House of Representatives. However, failing health caused Veitch to serve just two years in Parliament. By May 1945, Clement Aitcheson, the representative from Trelawny Northern was acting as Speaker, over a year before Veitch's death in July 1946.

== Awards and honors ==
- Veitch was posthumously awarded an OBE (Order of the British Empire) by King George VI for public service to Jamaica in 1945

== Personal life and death ==
Veitch was married to Gladys (née Edwards). He died on July 4, 1946, at the age of 59.

== See also ==
- List of speakers of the House of Representatives of Jamaica
