= St. Catherine High School =

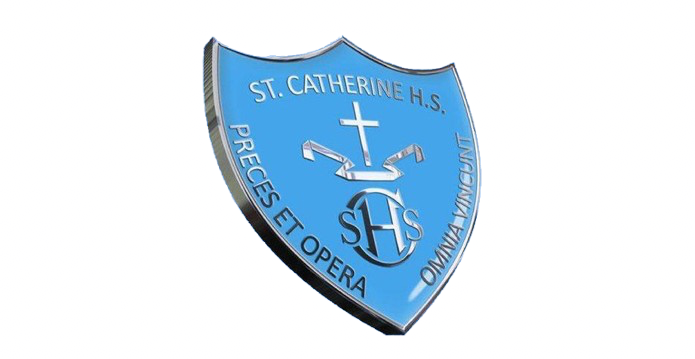
- St. Catherine High School Crest

Location
- 35 St. John's Road, St. Catherine; Spanish Town; Jamaica; 17.9982286°N 76.9729239°W

Information
- School type: Public
- Motto: Latin: Preces et Opera Omnia Vincunt; English: "Prayer and Work Conquer All"
- Religious affiliation: Christianity
- Denomination: Roman Catholic
- Patron saint: St. Catherine of Alexandria
- Founded: 6 September 1948
- Founders: Sr. Mary Mercedes Doorly RSM and Rev. Fr. Matthew J. Ashe SJ
- Status: Open
- Oversight: Ministry of Education, Skills, Youth & Information
- School number: 876-981-8004
- School code: 14073
- Chairman: Sharon Dale
- Principal: Marlon Campbell
- Staff: 140+
- Grades: 7–13
- Gender: Mixed
- Age range: 11–20
- Sixth form students: 240+
- Classes: 121+
- Average class size: 35 - 40
- Student to teacher ratio: 17:1
- Education system: British West Indian
- Classes offered: Humanities, Natural Sciences, Business Studies and Technology/ Technical Vocations.
- Hours in school day: Curricular: 7:45 to 2:40; Extra-Curricular: 3:00 to 4:00
- Campus: Joined Dual: Junior School Campus (Old Harbour Road Campus); Senior School Campus (St. John's Road Campus)
- Campus size: 20 Acres
- Campus type: Urban
- Houses: Avila; Goretti; Lourdes; Mercedes; Orleans; Paschal
- Colours: White & Deep Sky Blue
- Slogan: Mighty Conquerors!
- Song: Dear St. Catherine High; We Love You
- Sports: Football, Track & Field, Basketball, Cricket, Netball, Volleyball, Rugby
- Nickname: Catherine or Katherine
- Rival: St. Jago High School
- Accreditation: Ministry of Education, Caribbean Examinations Council, City & Guilds, Roman Catholic Archdiocese of Kingston
- Graduates: 300+ (Annually)
- Affiliation: Sisters of Mercy, Jesuits
- Alumni: Andrew Holness (Prime Minister of Jamaica); Juliet Holness (Politician); Kenneth Richards (Roman Catholic Archbishop of Kingston); Spice (Artiste); Chronixx (Artiste); Julien Alfred (Track & Field Athlete)
- Campus Minister: Sr. Doris Osondu D.D.L.
- Website: www.stcathshja.com
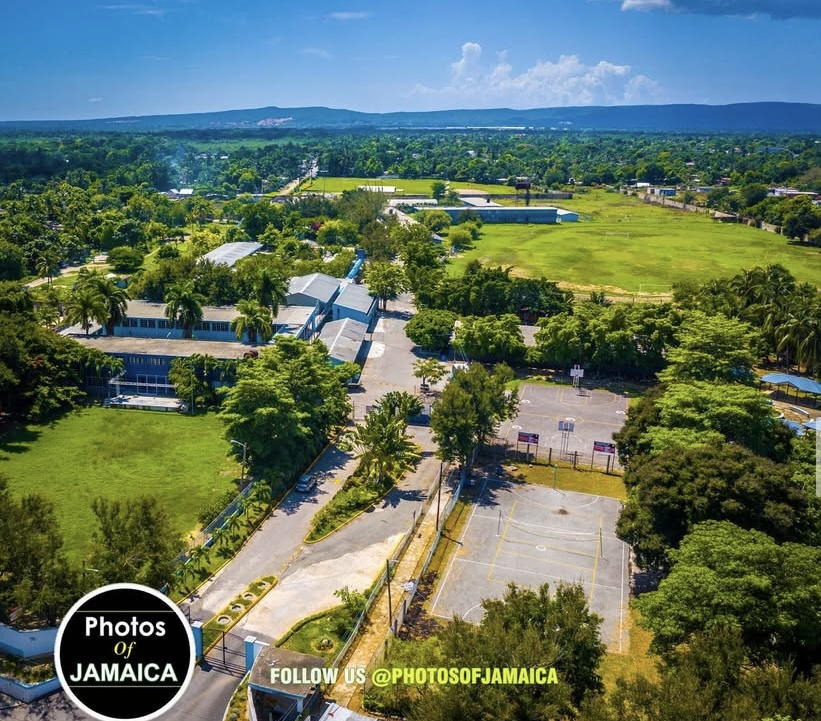

St. Catherine High School is a Catholic co-educational high school in the civic parish of St Catherine, Jamaica. It was founded by a Mercy sister and a Jesuit priest in 1948.

== History ==
=== Founding ===
The idea of establishing a Catholic high school in Spanish Town originated with Father Matthew Ashe S.J. and Sister Mary Mercedes Doorley R.S.M., who saw the need to establish a school for children in St Catherine -with the potential- who were unable to gain places in the traditional grammar schools in Spanish Town and Kingston.

The school was originally intended to be a co-educational Catholic high school and it was established on the Catholic ideal of the total development of the student with a focus on student-centred learning.

Father Matthew Ashe S.J. (1911–1990) arrived in Jamaica on 27 August 1945, with no inkling that he would later be involved in starting a high school in Spanish Town. His first assignment was with the St. Anne's Church located on Percy Street in Kingston. In September 1947, he was transferred to St Joseph's Church in Spanish Town to replace Father Gildy S.J".

Upon his arrival in Spanish Town, Father Gildy gave him a letter encouraging him to do "something for the Spanish Town mission". There was a big reception held for him at St. Catherine Primary. No sooner had Father Ashe arrived in Spanish Town than plans were afoot to start a Catholic high school.

Around the same time Sister Mary Mercedes Doorly R.S.M. (1884–1972), a Jamaican who was running the St Anthony's Academy, a secondary school in Port Antonio, was forced to close the school due to financial difficulties. She left the parish of Portland along with her two assistants, Mrs. Erma Blackman (née Campbell) and Mrs. Cynthia Jacobs (née Hedman), determined to open a new secondary school in Spanish Town. St. Catherine High is a continuation and solidification of Sr. Mercedes' mission, starting with St. Anthony's Academy, which she had established in 1921.

Sister Mercedes approached Father Ashe about collaborating to form a school and he immediately agreed. Although Father Ashe thought the odds were against them in starting the school, he nevertheless stated: "one had to look at the immediate future ... Spanish Town [had] so many townships and hamlets clustered about it far and wide [that it] possessed a great potential for a secondary school."

They sought Bishop Thomas Emmet's approval to start the new school; he was initially reluctant, but subsequently approved the plan for a second high school in Spanish Town.

=== First location: White Church Street ===
In the 1948 academic year, a Catholic high school named after the parish of St Catherine opened its doors with twenty three students: ten boys in the traditional khaki uniforms and thirteen girls in the original red and white tunics and straw hats. St. Catherine High School began as a co-educational institution on the same premises that now house St Catherine Primary School at 34 White Church Street. Maria Thompson was the first and only student registered in the first term and was later joined by the others in the second term. She was recruited by Sr. Mary Fidelis-Neary RSM and came from the Cathedral High School for Girls (later St. Jago). As the numbers increased, the need for additional space became necessary.

=== Second location- Brunswick Avenue ===
In 1951, the school moved to the Convent at 5 Brunswick Street, the present site of St. Catherine Preparatory and Basic Schools. By then, it had become an all girls school.

Soon after the school started, Sister Mercedes retired due to ill-health and returned to the Alpha Convent in Kingston. Sister Mary Clare Burns R.S.M. replaced her as principal of the school.

In 1954, Sister Mary Stanislaus Warburton (later Sister Anne Maries), a native of England, became the principal of the school. In a relatively short time the first results of students taking Senior Cambridge Exam showed a high percentage of pupils passing their exams; a number of students received credits and distinctions.

It was around this time in the early 1950s that the house system was introduced and the first graduation ceremony took place in 1955.

Sister Stanislaus' Superiors of her Order considered that the fledgling school would not survive as it could not compete with Grant-in-Aid Schools that received government subsidies and paid teachers better salaries. Tuition fees were not increased. Nevertheless, the Superiors were persuaded to keep the school open as Father Ashe along with others applied for Grant-in-Aid status, approved in 1958 by Minister of Education Florizel Glasspole, who later became Governor General of Jamaica.

Between 1959 and 1962 Sister Mary Pauline Mallette R.S.M. (Sister Carol), a Jamaican, acted as principal of the school while Sister Stanislaus went on to study in the United States. Sister Stanislaus returned to the school to resume her duties as principal. In 1962, she became principal of Mount St. Joseph's Academy in Mandeville.

In 1959 Father Ashe left Spanish Town because of ill health; he later became one of the founding teachers and treasurer at Campion College in Kingston. Father Frances Jackmaugh, a Jesuit of Lithuanian descent who previously served in Kingston at St. Anne's Church and Highgate at Sacred Heart Church, assumed Father Ashe's position at St. Joseph's Church. He took an interest in the school and through his efforts land was purchased at 35 St. John's Road Spanish Town to build a new school.

=== Final location: St. John's Road ===
In March 1960, the St. Catherine High School for Girls was moved to its present address which at the time was described as a "spacious and well kept campus" at 35 St John's Road. The subjects offered at the school included cookery, literature, Latin, Spanish, chemistry, biology, physics and various business subjects.

In 1962 Sister Mary Paschal-Figueroa R.S.M., was transferred from Alpha Academy in Kingston to become the successor of Sister Stanislaus. Sister Paschal, a Jamaican of Panamanian roots, had previously been Headmistress of Alpha Academy in Kingston and was the principal of Mount St. Joseph Academy, a secondary school in Mandeville. Father Ashe described Sister Paschal as "warm-hearted [but] a strict disciplinarian". Upon her arrival, Sister Paschal had to repay debts the school owed for buildings that were constructed prior to her arrival; she organised fund-raising and benefit dinners.

Under Sister Paschal's leadership, the school continued to maintain high educational standards despite the rapidly increasing student enrolment. Father Ashe recalled, "students began to converge on St. Catherine High School not only from the immediate environs of Spanish Town but additionally from ever-widening radius of hinterlands" Part of this new growth was the inclusion of a boys' school in 1972. This was sited south of the girls high school at what is now the Junior Campus and was started with the transfer of boys from the St. Catherine All-Age department. Permission was obtained from Archbishop John J. McEleney, S.J. and Sister Paschal's Superior to convert St. Catherine High School into a co-educational school.

In 1978, Paschal Hall (named after Sister Paschal) was officially dedicated.

Under Sister Paschal, the school introduced industrial arts for the boys. She wrote the school's song "Dear St. Catherine High We Love You". 6th form was first introduced at this time, preparing students for the GCE Advanced Level exams.

Sister Paschal was later summoned to St. Joseph's Hospital in Kingston to rescue it from financial troubles, and became the last nun administrator for St. Joseph's Hospital in Kingston. In 2005 the Government of Jamaica honoured Sister Paschal with the Order of Distinction (OD) for her work in the fields of education and healthcare.

In 1979 Madge Anderson, a vice-principal at the school, succeeded Sister Paschal as principal. Ms. Anderson also assumed the presidency of the Jamaica Catholic Education Association. Christabel Augustus-Fuller took over as principal in 1987; she was in post until 1993, and oversaw the construction of the Matthew Ashe Building on the Junior Campus. Named in honour of a founding father, it added eight classrooms and other facilities to the plant. Colleen Brown was principal from 1993 to 1999. Joan Tyser-Mills was principal from 1999 to 2008. During her tenure the 2005 Manning Cup team reached the semi-finals of the competition. She also opened the Guidance Center on the Senior Campus and planted Royal Palm trees on the campus. Claudia Neale was principal for the 2008–2009 academic year.

In 2009 the first male principal, Marlon Campbell, was appointed to the helm of the school. In 2015 the Lascelles Williams Park was opened and named for to the school's chairman and alumnus (he was in the first class of students that entered the school). It provides a space for recreational activities and dining.

== Curriculum ==
As a secondary school in Jamaica, St. Catherine High follows the traditional English grammar school model used throughout the British West Indies, incorporating the optional year 12 and 13, collectively known as sixth form. The first year of secondary school is regarded as first form, or Year Seven, and the subsequent year groups are numbered in increasing order up to sixth form. Students in the sixth form (years twelve and thirteen) are prepared for their CXC CAPE examinations.

Core Courses (available from 1st–3rd form)
English A (English Language), Mathematics, Physical Education
Agricultural Science, Art, Automechanics, Biology, Chemistry, English B (English Literature), Geography, History, Integrated Science, Physics, Religious Education, Spanish, Technical Drawing

CSEC Courses (available from 4th–5th form)
English A (English Language), Mathematics
Biology, Chemistry, English B (English Literature), EDPM, Geography, History, Mathematics, Office Procedures, Physics, Principles of Accounts, Principles of Business, Spanish, Social Studies, Information Technology

CAPE Courses (available for 6th form)
Caribbean Studies, Communication Studies
Accounts, Biology, Chemistry, Computer Science, Economics, English Literature, Geometrical Design, Management of Business., Physics, Spanish, Sociology, Pure Mathematics.

== Insignia ==
=== School crest ===
The school's crest is a shield with sky blue fill which represents truth and loyalty. Within the shield is the school's abbreviation above which is a banner and a Latin cross which symbolises faith. The periphery of the shield carries the school's name and motto.

=== Motto ===
The school's motto is Preces et Opera Omnia Vincunt and is translated "Prayer and Work Conquer All." The motto (Latin) is actually pronounced 'prae-kes et op-ay-ra om-nia wing-kunt'.

The rally cry from one Catherinite to another is simply "Preces!"

=== Nickname ===
The nickname "Catherine" is the shortened version of the school's official name.

== Principals ==
The first five principals of St. Catherine High were Sisters of Mercy, the cofounders of the school. Afterwards, the school entered into a phase of laity and interdenominational leadership. Mr. Marlon Campbell, the institution's present and first male principal, is the second longest serving person in the position, having assumed that office in September 2009.

Name of Principal	Year
Sr. Mary Mercedes Doorly R.S.M.	1948–1951
Sr. Mary Clare Burns R.S.M.	1952–1955
Sr. Mary Stanislaus Warburton R.S.M.	1955–1958
Sr. Mary Pauline Mallette R.S.M. (Sr. Carol)	1959–1962
Sr. Anne-Marie Warburton R.S.M. (Sr. Stanislaus)	1961–1962
Sr. Mary Paschal Figueroa R.S.M. C.D.	1962–1980
Ms Madge Anderson	1980–1987
Mrs. Christabel Fuller	1987–1993
Mrs. Colleen Brown	1993–1999
Mrs. Joan B. Tyser-Mills J.P. O.D.	1999–2008
Ms. Claudia Neale	2008–2009
Mr. Marlon Campbell	2009–present

== Houses ==
St. Catherine High has 6 houses. This is two more than the original four started in the early 1950s that were all named in honour of women Saints, most likely because the school was an all-girls institution presided over by nuns. Since then two of the Sisters of Mercy principals have been honoured with houses in their name. Listed below are the six:

Name	Patron	Mascot	Colour
LOURDES	St. Bernadette Soubirous		Red
AVILA	St. Teresa of Ávila		Yellow
GORETTI	St. Maria Goretti	Lion	White with Purple trim
ORLEANS	St. Joan of Arc	Eagle	Blue
PASCHAL	Sr Mary Paschal		Green
MERCEDES	Sr Mary Mercedes		Orange

== Notable alumni ==
=== Politics and government ===
- Denise Daley, politician
- Andrew Holness, Prime Minister of Jamaica
- Juliet Holness, Speaker of the House of Representatives
- Portia Simpson-Miller, former Prime Minister of Jamaica

=== Arts and sports ===
- Julien Alfred, Saint Lucian sprinter
- Chronixx, reggae artist
- Sandrey Davison, sprinter
- Brenton Griffiths, footballer
- Aaron Johnson, cricketer
- Spice, dancehall artist

=== Civil society ===
- Kenneth Richards, Roman Catholic Archbishop of Kingston in Jamaica
