= Phyllis MacPherson-Russell =

Jamaican politician

Dr. The Hon. Phyllis MacPherson-Russell OJ OD MP
- Born: November 18, 1923; Kingston, Colony of Jamaica, British Empire
- Died: April 19, 2008 (aged 84)

Minister of Education
- In office 1979–1980
- Prime Minister: Michael Manley; Edward Seaga
- Preceded by: Eric Bell
- Succeeded by: Mavis Gilmour

Phyllis Claire Macpherson-Russell OD, OJ (18 November 1923 Kingston - 19 April 2008) was a Jamaican politician for the People's National Party (PNP). She was rapporteur for the World Conference on Women, 1975.

== Biography ==
Phyllis Macpherson-Russell studied mathematics at the University of London, between 1945 and 1948. Already during her studies, she was involved in the interests of the Caribbean and was a representative at conferences of the World Federation of Democratic Youth in London. After receiving an Issa Scholarship, she received a Grace Hoadley Dodge Scholarship, which helped her earn a postgraduate degree from Columbia University. She graduated in 1961, with a doctorate in pedagogy. After returning to Jamaica, she became a lecturer at the Faculty of Extracurricular Education, now the School of Continuing Education, at the University of the West Indies (UWI).

In August 1978, she was appointed Minister of Education by Michael Manley in his government, making her the second Jamaican woman to serve as a minister after Rose Leon. The Department of Education led them until the PNP's defeat against the Jamaica Labor Party (JLP) in the general election and the end of Manley's term on 1 November 1980. Subsequently, she resumed teaching and devoted herself in particular to the expansion of mathematical education in Jamaica.

She has received multiple awards for her services and, after the Order of Distinction (1991) in 1993, received the Pelican Award from the Graduate Association for her basic work in the field of human resource development. On April 12, 1999, she was awarded an honorary doctorate (Sc.D.) by Central Connecticut State University (CCSU). She was awarded the Order of Jamaica in 2003 .

== Family ==
She is the sister of Ripton MacPherson.

== See also ==
- List of education ministers of Jamaica
- Women in the House of Representatives of Jamaica
