= Alva Ross =

Jamaican politician (1928–2004)

Alva Edison Ross (3 September 1928 – 7 November 2004) was a Jamaican politician, born at Rock River, St. Mary, Jamaica. He was a speaker in the House of Representatives from 1983 to 1989.

== See also ==
- List of speakers of the House of Representatives of Jamaica
