= Ronald Thwaites =

Jamaican lawyer and politician

The Honourable Ronald Thwaites

Minister of Education
- In office 2012–2016
- Monarch: Elizabeth II
- Governor General: Sir Patrick Allen
- Prime Minister: Portia Simpson-Miller
- Preceded by: Andrew Holness
- Succeeded by: Ruel Reid

Member of Parliament for Kingston Central
- In office 1997–2020

Personal details
- Born: February 12, 1945 (age 81) St Andrew, Colony of Jamaica, British Empire
- Party: People's National Party
- Spouse: Marcia Veronica Thwaites (née McKenley) (m. 1966)
- Children: 7
- Education: University of Oxford; Cornell University; Campion Hall, Oxford; University of the West Indies

Ronald George Thwaites (born February 12, 1945) is a Jamaican attorney-at-law and politician, representing the People's National Party (PNP). He was Member of Parliament (MP) for the constituency of Kingston Central, serving from 1989 to 2002, and again from 2007 to 2020. He served as Minister of Education from 2012 to 2016.

== Early life and education ==
Thwaites was born on February 12, 1945, in Saint Andrew Parish, Jamaica, the son of Ronald George Thwaites and Lena May Thwaites (née D'Costa). He received his early education at Westbrook Preparatory School and St George's College. Thwaites was awarded the Jamaica Scholarship to Cornell University, where he was editor-in-chief of The Cornell Daily Sun and a member of the Quill and Dagger society. In 1968 he won a Rhodes Scholarship to Campion Hall, Oxford. He also attended the University of the West Indies, and Gray's Inn, London.

== Legal career ==
Thwaites founded the Kingston Legal Aid Clinic in 1972 and was its managing director from 1972 to 1975. He also co-founded the Montego Bay Legal Aid Clinic in 1974. He has been a partner in the law firm Daly, Thwaites and Company since 1979.

== Political career ==
Thwaites was first elected Member of Parliament for the constituency of Kingston Central in the 1997 general election, polling 6,907 votes to 4,643 for Christine Davis for the Jamaica Labour Party (JLP). He did not seek re-election in the 2002 general election, but was again re-elected to Parliament in 2007, polling 5,210 votes to the JLP's Charlton Collie (3,745). In May 2011 he was named the Opposition Spokesperson on Education and in January 2012 was appointed Minister of Education in the Portia Simpson-Miller cabinet after the PNP won the 2011 general election. In 2020, Thwaites decided not to seek re-election in the 2020 general elections.

== Personal life ==
Thwaites is married to Marcia Veronica Thwaites (née McKenley) and has five sons and two daughters.

== See also ==
- List of education ministers of Jamaica

Political offices
Preceded by Andrew Holness	Minister of Education; 2012 – 2016	Succeeded by Ruel Reid
