= Abraham Elias Issa =

Jamaican businessman

Abe Issa CBE OJ
- Born: Abraham Elias Issa; October 10, 1905; Kingston, Jamaica
- Died: November 29, 1984 (aged 79)
- Education: College of the Holy Cross (BA)
- Spouse: Lorraine Shaouy (m. 1937)
- Children: 6

Abraham Elias Issa CBE OJ (October 10, 1905 – November 29, 1984) was a Jamaican businessman, entrepreneur and hotelier acclaimed as "The Father of Jamaican Tourism". As the first president of the Jamaica Tourist Board, he contributed to the expansion of Jamaican tourism in the late 1950s.

His business accomplishments include the founding of Jamaica's first modern department store (Issa's of King Street), the country's first shopping plazas (Tropical Plaza at Half-Way-Tree and Liguanea Plazas), Jamaica's first supermarket (Hi-Lo at Cross Roads in Kingston), Jamaica's modern horse-racing track (Caymanas Park) and being a guiding force behind the development of New Kingston, now the island's commercial center. He built Tower Isle Hotel, Jamaica's first all-season resort later evolving it into Couples Hotel, Jamaica's first all-inclusive resort and first couples only resort.

== Early life ==
Issa was born in Kingston, Jamaica, to Mary Brimo (died 1953), daughter of Joseph Brimo, a merchant from Damascus, Syria, and Elias Abraham Issa (May 29, 1876 – September 1, 1969), son of Abraham Issa, a merchant from Bethlehem, Palestine who immigrated to Kingston in 1894 with his son Elias. Issa's parents Elias and Mary were married on February 25, 1900, and the union gave birth to four children, Bertha, Abe, Joseph, and Annie.

The Issa family struggled to establish itself in Kingston. A small notions shop, opened at 32 Princess Street in 1894, failed and Abe's father and grandfather were reduced to peddling goods door to door until they could open a new shop at 27 Orange Street. By 1900 they succeeded in bringing Abe's grandmother Sara and his father's brothers John, Antonio and Joseph to Jamaica. In 1901, Issa's father Elias formed a partnership with his brothers as E.A. Issa & Bros. The enterprise thrived and in 1905 moved to 132 Harbour Street. The shop was destroyed in the January 14, 1907 Kingston earthquake which also took the life of Abe's Uncle Joseph.

Issa began his elementary education at St. Aloysius School in 1910 then went on to high school studies at St. George's College from 1918 to 1922. Following a nine-month stint teaching English to South American students, he departed for Worcester, Massachusetts to begin his university education at College of the Holy Cross. In 1926, he graduated summa cum laude and delivered his valedictory address in Latin.

== Career ==
Issa returned to Kingston in 1926 and entered the family business. On Dec. 1930 he opened the family's first retail store, Issa's of King Street, that featured international luxury goods.

In the early 1930s Abe traveled extensively on the business' behalf to North America and Europe. In 1934 he traveled Japan via Russia and the Trans-Siberian Railroad and worked 14 months in Yokohama operating a factory that manufactured rubber-soled shoes.

Abe's international experiences and knowledge of luxury quality merchandise combined with his outgoing and effusive personality served him well in the family's first move outside the retail trade. On March 14, 1943, the Issa's bought the Myrtle Bank Hotel and a next door laundry from United Fruit Company for £35,000. Under Abe's guidance the hotel gained renown as a favored gathering spot of celebrities and distinguished visitors. Its guests included actor Errol Flynn, jazz great Louis Armstrong, actress Joan Crawford, Walt Disney, future Jamaican prime minister Norman Manley, future United States presidential candidate Adlai Stevenson II and British Prime Minister Winston Churchill.

Abe rose to become the Vice President of Kingston's Chamber of Commerce. In 1942 he was heralded as "Man of the Year" by Kingston's Spotlight Magazine. The following year he made a foray into politics by forming the Jamaica Democratic Party. While the party failed to win any legislative seats in the 1944 election it began Abe's long involvement in the affairs of the soon-to-be independent nation.

In 1955 Abe became the first President of the newly formed Jamaica Tourist Board serving in that post until 1963. He led an aggressive international marketing campaign. Jamaican tourism grew from 86,000 tourists and £4 million in revenue in 1955 to 227,000 tourists with £38 million in revenue in 1962. In 1958 he was appointed to Jamaica's legislative council on approval by the Queen. In 1959 he was elected President of the Caribbean Tourist Association.

During this time he led his family's business expansion with the opening of the Hi-Lo at Cross Roads in Kingston. On August 6, 1962, Jamaica became an independent nation and Abe played several key roles in the young nation's economic development. He served as a director of the Jamaica Industrial Development Corporation, headed the Development Finance Corporation, and its successor Jamaica Development Bank and as director of the Urban Development Corporation, where he outlined plans for cruise ship access to Kingston's harbor. He served as chairman of Jamaica Unit Trust Services Ltd. the managing company of the Jamaica Investment Fund and in 1974 served as chairman of Free Zone Promotional Council. From 1965 to 1972 he served as a board member of Air Jamaica. In 1968 he took over and turned around of the troubled assets of Runaway Bay Golf and Country Club and Runaway Bay Golf Course from Sunley Hotels Ltd. In 1973 he obtained the Hertz car rental franchise for Jamaica.

== Awards ==
In 1960 Issa was made a Commander of the Order of the British Empire (CBE) for his contributions in the field of tourism. He was awarded the Order of Jamaica (OJ) in 1980 in recognition of his pioneering role in the development of the tourism industry in Jamaica. In 1984 he was awarded Norman Manley Award For Excellence in the Field of Tourism. In 2004 he was posthumously honored by being placed on a Jamaican postage stamp being hailed as "the Father of Jamaican tourism" for his role in the creation of the Jamaican Tourist Industry.

== Personal life ==
While on 1931 business trip to New York City, Abe met Lorraine Shaouy, daughter of Adele Massabni and Elias Shaouy of Beirut, Lebanon, a designer who had moved to New York in 1898 and opened design school and was later a real estate investor. Abe and Lorraine married in Bethlehem, Palestine on Feb. 1, 1937. The couple would have six children, Carole, Brenda, the twins Suzanne and Lee (Elias), Jackie, Paul.

Issa died on November 29, 1984, following a period of terminal illness.
