= Meadowbrook High School, Jamaica =

High school in Kingston, Jamaica

Meadowbrook High School

Location
- 2 Meadowbrook Avenue; Kingston, Jamaica, Kingston 19; Jamaica
- Coordinates: 18°02′52″N 76°48′51″W

Information
- Motto: Ita Splendeat Lux Vestra (Let Your Light So Shine)
- Established: 13 March 1958
- Founders: Reverend Henry Ward, Reverend William McGhie, and Reverend Margaret 'Madge' Saunders
- Principal: Kevin Facey
- Grades: 7-13
- Enrollment: 2000
- Hours in school day: 07:45 - 03:40
- Campus type: Suburban
- Houses: Saunders; Ward; Rothnie; Gartshore
Colours
Blue, Green
- Song: "As We Glorify Our Father"; "We build our school on thee, O lord"
- Nickname: M'Brook
- Accreditation: Ministry of Education, Jamaica
- Alumni: Meadowbrookians
- Website: https://www.meadowbrookhighschool.net

Meadowbrook High School is a government-aided learning institution located in the suburbs of Kingston, Jamaica. It is co-educational, first-to-sixth form, secondary school located in the community of Meadowbrook in the parish of St. Andrew. It was founded on 13 March 1958 by the United Church in Jamaica and the Cayman Islands.

The school's four houses are named after individuals who were instrumental in the founding of the institution. They are:

- Ward: (Red) Rt. Rev. Henry Ward – Co-Founder and former Moderator of United Church in Jamaica and Cayman Islands
- Saunders: (Green) Rev. Margaret 'Madge' Saunders – Co Founder
- Gartshore: (Blue) Ms. Margaret Gartshore – First substantive principal
- Rothnie: (Yellow) Rev. Dr. Douglas A. Rothnie – Moderator and Clerk of Synod of United Church in Jamaica and Cayman Islands

== Uniform ==
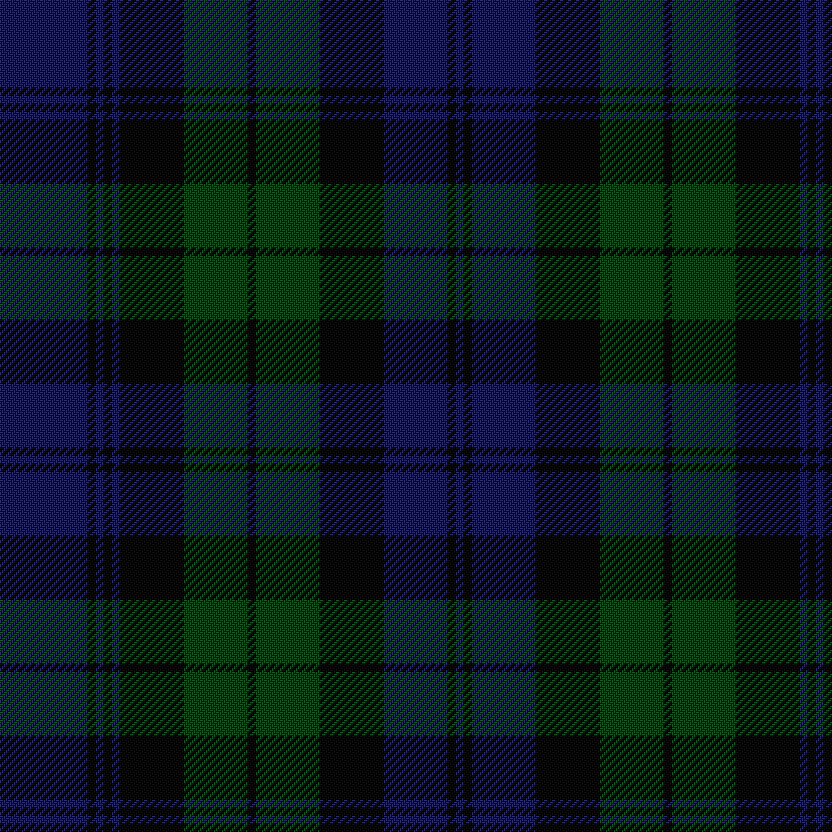
The Black Watch tartan pattern used in Meadowbrook girls' uniform

The Black Watch tartan, also known as the "Government sett", or the Campbell tartan. The tartan was used, and is in current use, by several military units throughout the Commonwealth.

- As is the case with Jamaican public schools, the uniform is worn by all students. For girls, this is a tunic with the Black Watch tartan with a white blouse, and for boys khaki pants and a shirt, with the school's crest.
- Female sixth-form students wear a variant of the tunic, with the Black Watch tartan included. Male sixth-form students wear a white shirt and a tie of the school's colors as their uniform.
- The tartan was chosen by Rev William McGhie as a link between his Scottish homeland and Jamaica and to symbolize the school's solidarity with the Presbyterian Church (Church of Scotland), which would later be amalgamated with the Congregational Union of Jamaica and The Disciples of Christ to form the United Church in Jamaica and the Cayman Islands.

== School crest ==
The school's crest consists of two concentric circles, within which the school's motto is displayed in Latin. The school's motto surrounds the school's symbol, a golden star. The star, represents the potential of every individual to harness their individual talent and 'shine', thus making a contribution to the society in which they live. The crest design and motto was introduced as the school badge by Rev William McGhie who was the Deputy Headmaster of Meadowbrook High School. The badge was a copy of the school badge of Eastbank Academy in Glasgow, Scotland which was Rev McGhie's had attended. Permission to use the badge was sought by Rev McGhie, and was given by the school authorities.

The school motto is derived from Matthew 5:16:

English:

Let your light so shine before men,
that they may see your good works,
and glorify your Father which is in heaven.

Latin:

Ita splendeat lux vestra coram hominibus,
ut videant vestra bona opera,
et glorificent partrem vestrum qui in ccelis.

== Firsts ==
- First high school to enter a visually impaired student in the TVJ School's Challenge Quiz Competition.
- First high school to recruit female cadets for the Jamaica Combined Cadet Force (in 1980).
- First high school to have a female cadet achieve the rank of Warrant Officer Class Two, in 2008. The rank was previously held by males only.

(Jamaica Combined Cadet Force was founded in November 1943 as an all-male civic movement)

- First high school to have an aviation club through Club Aviation Jamaica.

== Achievement of Staff ==
- Jamaica's Spanish Teacher of the Year 2013: Errol Haughton
- Novel Publication: Coleen Smith-Dennis

== Notable alumni ==
- [Sam Walker], retired US Judge.
- [Bert Samuels], Very notable Jamaican attorney-at-law.
- [Christopher Townsend], Very notable Jamaican attorney-at-lay.
- [Peter Champagnie K.C., J.P.], Very notable Jamaican attorney-at-law.
- Aidonia, Jamaican dancehall recording and performing artist.
- Colin Channer, Jamaican-American writer.

== See also ==
- Jamaica High School Football Champions
