= St. George's College, Jamaica =

St. George's College

Location
- North Street, Winchester Park; Kingston, Jamaica; Jamaica
- Coordinates: 17°58′38″N 76°47′05″W

Information
- Former names: St. George’s Colonial College (1850-1852); St. George’s Presbytery Secondary School (1852-
- Type: Public secondary school
- Motto: Latin: Ad Majorem Dei Gloriam; English: For the Greater Glory of God
- Religious affiliation: Roman Catholic (Jesuit)
- Patron saint: St. George
- Established: 2 September 1850; 175 years ago
- Founder: Society of Jesus
- Educational authority: Ministry of Education
- Principal: Margaret Campbell
- Staff: 32
- Faculty: 78
- Gender: Male, 6th form coed
- Enrollment: 1,460
- Houses: Bellarmine ( Gold ); Campion ( Red ); Loyola ( Orange ); Regis ( Green ); Xavier ( Blue )
- Colors: Blue and White
- Song: Hail, St. George's Alma Mater
- Sports: Lacrosse; basketball; badminton; chess; cricket; football; lawn tennis; rugby; swimming; table tennis; track & field
- Nickname: Georgian
- Rival: Kingston College
- Website: www.stgc.org

St. George's College is a public Catholic secondary school, located in Kingston, Jamaica. The school was founded by the Society of Jesus in 1850. It was established by 21 Spanish Jesuits who had been exiled from Colombia as part of a religious persecution. Initially founded as a school for boys only, in 2005 the College opened its pre-university programme (Sixth Form) to female students.

== History ==
=== Early beginnings ===
St. George's Colonial College was founded in 1850 by twenty-one Spanish Jesuits who had been exiled from Colombia as part of a religious persecution. The Colombian Government had given them approximately nine hours to leave the country by any means possible. After they failed to leave, due to unavailability of transportation, the government extended their time to 48 hours; within the 48-hour time, a lone ship was leaving for Jamaica, which they boarded.

At their head was Fr. Emmanuel Gil, S.J., a distinguished scholar and former court preacher to the King of Spain. Amidst a storm of protest against Roman Catholic priests opening Jamaica's first secondary institution for classical and scientific education, St. George's College began its long and proud history. The early years of the school's life were uncertain, as it was closed several times in the first few decades of its existence, but the principal at that time bought the present property where the school stands to this day.

On 2 September 1850, in a rented house at 26 North Street, located on the southeast corner of North and Orange Streets, the new college opened with thirty-eight-day students and thirty boarders. The first subjects taught at St. George's included Latin, Greek, French, English, rhetoric, history, mathematics, logic, metaphysics, ethics, drawing, and calligraphy.

After only two years, the Spanish Jesuits, led by founder Fr. Gil, S.J., departed Jamaica to teach in Guatemala, turning St. George's over to the English Jesuits. They left primarily because of the difficulties in language, with English being a second language to them. The school moved to 5 Upper King Street and changed its name to the "St. George's Presbytery Secondary School". There it remained until January 1866 when, for reasons which remain unclear, it was closed. A few months later, thanks to Fr. James Jones, S.J., the school reopened with twenty-five students and moved back to its original site at 26 North Street, again under the name St. George's College.

Only three years later, succumbing to the opposition of the Jesuit Superior, the school was closed a second time, around Christmas of 1871. On this occasion, the strong petitions of ninety-two influential Kingstonians convinced the Jesuits to reopen St. George's College. It reopened in March 1873 but on a smaller scale, with only two Jesuit teachers. The school prospered until September 1877 when it was closed a third time, but only for a few days. The return of Fr. James Jones, S.J., and the leadership of Fr. Thomas Porter, S.J., assured the continued life and irrepressible growth of St. George's College, which has endured to this day.

=== Expansion and development ===
In February 1905, the Jesuits bought a large property called Pawsey's Pen (what is now Winchester Park) from Mr. Alfred Pawsey. They converted the Pawsey residence into a classroom building and had classes started before the end of March. (That original building stood until 1979, when it was demolished to make way for the new Abe Issa Auditorium.) Classes were suspended briefly after the earthquake in 1907 while the campus, partially destroyed and subsequently repaired, was used as a hospital for victims of what was Kingston's worst earthquake ever.

The present Jesuit residence (now called the Jesuit Centre) was built in 1910, and the Jesuits finally moved over from the old site at North and Orange Streets. Enrollment in the College at that time was barely one hundred boys, but more classroom space was needed. In 1913, the construction of a new building was authorised by the headmaster whose name it bears, Fr. William O'Hare, S.J. Its architect was Mr. Braman Judah, whose two sons, Sydney and Charles, later became Jesuit priests. The O'Hare Building has since become the landmark of St. George's College.

In March 1939, St. George's College built the first science laboratory on the island. It was blessed and dedicated by His Lordship Bishop Emmet, S.J., in the presence of His Excellency Sir Arthur Richards, KCMG. Chemistry was introduced to the College in January 1945 by Fr. John A. Blatchford, S.J. At the dedication of the chemistry laboratory hopes were expressed that a biology laboratory would soon follow, to alleviate the critical shortage of medical students, trumpeted by the Jamaican media at the time.

=== Jamaica's first faculty of sciences ===
In 1945, the first biology classes were started at the College, again initiated by Fr. Blatchford, S.J. In January 1947 the present biology lab was completed and commissioned into operation. Again, these were the first chemistry and biology laboratories on the island: University of the West Indies (U.W.I.) was just being founded.

Continuing the emphasis on sciences, the physics lab was completed in January 1953, thus completing the "Faculty of Sciences" at the College. The building was dedicated by Rt. Rev. John J. McEleney, S.J., on Friday, 26 June 1953.

=== Becoming a government school ===
St. George's College decided to become a grant-in-aid school in 1936, and it became a part of the Government's educational system. The Jamaican Government would provide the salaries of the teaching faculty and staff. This new status, however, forced the Jesuits to give up some control of the school to the Ministry of Education. In 1956, the Ministry of Education established a Common Entrance Examination, ending the College's own entrance examination and selection of its students. The Grade Six Achievement Test (GSAT) was initiated in 1998, further regularising the entrance of students.

Discipline has always been a strong element of St. George's College, and the College's Merit/ Demerit system was inaugurated by Fr. William Hannas, S.J., in 1940, to maintain discipline but also to encourage a spirit of competition. To this end, Hannas emphasised the English-based house system already existing at the College. The student body was divided into three "houses":Bellarmine, Campion, and Xavier, named after Jesuit saints. Two more houses were later added: Loyola in September 1941, and Regis in the late 1950s. These five houses became rivals for leadership in studies, sports, and discipline.

=== Recent development ===
The campus has continued to grow. In 1950, as part of the College's Centenary Anniversary, the Old Boys' Association made a commitment to construct a pavilion at Emmet Park. This was completed and handed over to the College on 1 July 1951. In 1955, the lawn tennis courts were built. In March 1956, the roadway to link Emmet Park with the rest of the campus was constructed. In 1986 the Abe Issa Auditorium, the Fr. William Hannas Building (which houses the canteen), and the Fr. Crutchley, S.J., Computer Laboratory were completed. Emmet Park was restored in 1991. The USAID-funded Butler building expansion and the Student Development Centre were completed in 1993, and the Archbishop Samuel E. Carter, S.J., Library was completed in 1997. The Thomas Brodley, S.J., Computer Laboratory was completed in 2002.

== Student and staff population ==
The size of the student population has grown steadily over the years. In 1905 when the College moved to Winchester Park there were approximately 100 students. By 1942 enrollment had slowly risen to 235 students, by 1952 to 452 students, and in 1962 – the year Jamaica gained independence – in excess of 800 students. As of 2005, there were about 1350 students. The size of the faculty has also grown accordingly. In 1905 there were 11 teachers (6 Jesuits and 5 laymen) and by 1942 the number had risen slightly to 13 (12 Jesuits and 1 layman). In 1952 there were 26 (18 Jesuits and 8 laymen). As of 2005, there were more than 70 teachers.

== Motto ==
The school's motto is in Latin: Ad Majorem Dei Gloriam, translated as "For the Greater Glory of God".

== Notable alumni ==
- John Barnes MBE – an English former professional football player and manager; commentator and pundit, ESPN and SuperSport
- Alfie Binns – cricket player for West Indies
- Vivian Blake – convicted drug trafficker and people smuggler
- Hon. Dr. G. Raymond Chang OC, OJ – businessman, philanthropist, and former chancellor of Ryerson University
- Right Reverend Percival Gibson CBE – former Anglican Bishop of Jamaica
- Bruce Golding – former Prime Minister of Jamaica
- John Groves – cricket player and administrator
- Hon. Abe Issa CBE, OJ – renown as the father of Jamaican tourism
- Byron Lee OJ, CD – musician, record producer, and entrepreneur, best known for his work as leader of Byron Lee and the Dragonaires
- Andre Lewis – professional football player
- Professor Robert Lue – former researcher and academic, best known for his contributions to molecular animation
- Very Reverend Fr. Richard Ho Lung OJ – founder of the Missionaries of the Poor
- Roy McCatty – cricket player
- Stephen Marley – musician; eight-time Grammy Award winner
- Ziggy Marley – musician and philanthropist; eight-time Grammy Award winner and a Daytime Emmy Award recipient; principal of Ziggy Marley and the Melody Makers
- Tyrone Marshall – retired Jamaican footballer and current coach
- Professor Trevor Munroe – 1966 Rhodes scholar; political scientist and civil society advocate
- Dwight Nelson – former senator and former Minister of National Security
- Ronald Thwaites – 1968 Rhodes scholar; media personality, lawyer, Catholic deacon, former Minister of Education
- Don Wehby – businessman and former politician
- David Weller – cyclist, won the Bronze Medal at the 1980 Summer Olympics
- Andy Williams – retired football player
- Craig Ziadie – football player
- Dennis Ziadie – football player

== See also ==
- Catholic Church in Jamaica
- Education in Jamaica
- Jamaica High School Football Champions
- List of Jesuit schools
- Manning Cup
