= Ivan Lloyd =

Jamaican medical practitioner and politician

Ivan Stewart Lloyd

Minister of Health
- In office 1959–1962
- Monarch: Elizabeth II
- Prime Minister: Norman Manley
- Governor: Sir Kenneth Blackburne
- Preceded by: C. L. A. Stuart
- Succeeded by: Herbert Eldemire

Minister of Home Affairs
- In office 1957–1959
- Monarch: Elizabeth II
- Prime Minister: Norman Manley
- Governor: Sir Kenneth Blackburne
- Succeeded by: William Seivwright

Minister of Education and Social Welfare
- In office 1955–1957
- Monarch: Elizabeth II
- Prime Minister: Norman Manley
- Governor: Sir Hugh Foot
- Preceded by: Edwin Allen
- Succeeded by: Sir Florizel Glasspole

Personal details
- Born: June 6, 1903 Kingston, Colony of Jamaica, British Empire
- Died: August 2, 1993 (aged 90)
- Party: People's National Party
- Spouse: Eunice Louise (née Scott) (m. 1941)

Ivan Stewart Lloyd (June 6, 1903 – August 2, 1993) was a Jamaican medical practitioner and politician, representing the People's National Party (PNP). He served as Jamaica's first Leader of the Opposition from 1944 to 1949, Minister of Education and Social Welfare from 1955 to 1957, Minister of Home Affairs from 1957 to 1959, and was Minister of Health between 1959 and 1962.

== Early life and education ==
Ivan Stewart Lloyd was born on June 6, 1903, in Hatfield, Manchester. He was the third son of six sons and two daughters born to Jethro Amaziah Lloyd, educator, and his wife Frances Rose (née Monteith). Lloyd was educated at St. John's College in Kingston, Illinois University, City College of New York, Royal College of Physicians of Edinburgh, and Howard University.

== Medical career ==
Lloyd returned to Jamaica as a qualified medical practitioner in the early 1930s. He first started working in Kingston, then was later transferred to Claremont in St. Ann as a government medical officer in 1933. In 1940, he resigned his government position and entered private practice.

== Political career ==
Lloyd joined the newly-formed People's National Party (PNP) and in 1942 was elected a member of the Legislative Council from the parish of St. Ann, becoming the first person from PNP to be elected to public office. On October 27, 1944, Jamaica was granted a new Constitution with universal adult suffrage and a House of Representatives with 32 seats. Lloyd contested the newly-formed Saint Ann Eastern constituency for the PNP in the first general election on December 14, 1944. He polled 10,635 votes to 1,390 for Gilbert Laing of the Jamaica Labour Party (JLP). The margin of victory was 9,245 votes, the highest majority in the country at the time. The PNP lost the election to the JLP and Lloyd became Jamaica's first Opposition Leader from December 1944 to December 1949, since party president Norman Manley did not win a seat in Parliament. In the 1949 general election, Lloyd again won the constituency, polling 11,832 votes to the JLP's Ridley Baird (3,248). He defeated the JLP's Hector Gibson in the 1955 general election, receiving 13,270 votes to Gibson's 3,472. When the PNP formed the Government between 1955 and 1959, Lloyd served as minister of education and social welfare from 1955 to 1957 and as minister of home affairs from 1957 to 1959. In 1959, the constituency of Saint Ann Eastern was abolished and Lloyd contested the 1959 general election from the newly-created Saint Ann South Eastern constituency. He polled 7,334 votes to 1,584 for the JLP's Flavius McKinley. Lloyd went on to serve as minister of health from 1959 until the PNP's defeat at the polls in 1962.

=== Resignation ===
In 1969, after 27 years as a legislator, Lloyd resigned his seat shortly after Michael Manley became PNP president, citing problems with the new party leadership as the reason for quitting both the PNP and Parliament. In the resulting by-election set for March 17, 1969, Lloyd's son, Garland Lloyd, ran for the seat on behalf of the JLP, but lost to Seymour Mullings of the PNP.

== Personal life and death ==
Lloyd married Eunice Louise Scott in 1941. He died on August 2, 1993, at the age of 90.

== See also ==
- List of education ministers of Jamaica
- List of ministers of health of Jamaica

Political offices
Preceded by Edwin Allen	Minister of Education; 1955 – 1957	Succeeded by Sir Florizel Glasspole
Preceded by New ministerial post	Minister of Home Affairs; 1957 – 1959	Succeeded by William Seivwright
Preceded by C. L. A. Stuart	Minister of Health; 1959 – 1962	Succeeded by Herbert Eldemire
