= Manning Cup =

ISSA / Manning Cup Football Competition
- Founded: 1914
- Country: Jamaica
- Number of clubs: 22(2021)
- Level on pyramid: Schoolboys U-19
- Current champions: Jamaica College; 30th Manning Cup (Current season)
- Most championships: Jamaica College; 31 Manning Cups
- Website: https://www.schoolboyfootball.com/the-manning-cup
- Current: Current season

The Manning Cup Football Competition (also currently known as the Inter-Secondary Schools Sports Association (ISSA)/Gatorade/Digicel Manning Cup football competition for sponsorship reasons) is an annual football (soccer) contest among Secondary High School Under-19 boys' teams located in the Kingston & St Andrew and Saint Catherine parishes of Jamaica. Along with the Dacosta Cup contest for rural high school boys, the Manning Cup is one of the most watched football sporting events in Jamaica, rivaling the country's highest level football league (Jamaica Premier League) in popularity, . The competition remains a key showcase for talented players and serves as a launchpad into domestic and overseas club careers as well as call up opportunities to the Jamaica national football team.

== History ==
=== Pre Manning Cup years ===
Prior to the Manning Cup competition, most secondary schools across the island with active football teams competed in the “Jamaica Inter-Scholastic Association Football Shield Competition” for the “Olivier Shield”. This competition began in 1909 and was played on a knock-out basis. Another major tournament featuring schoolboy teams during that period was the Martinez Shield.

=== Formation of the competition ===
By 1913, many of the secondary schools that were located in and around Kingston, felt that the competition format limited the number of possible games and preferred to change to a round-robin points based tournament which would guarantee each team at least two matches against each opponent. This format, however, would have significant logistical drawbacks for the single rural school Potsdam, located in St. Elizabeth, which would now have to travel extensively more so than the other participants.

With these pros and cons in mind, on Dec 2, 1913, a meeting of representatives of the following four secondary schools took place at Sabina Park:

- St. George's College (Rev Father O’Hare & I.J. Crutchley)
- Jamaica College (R.H. Smith & J.M. Hall)
- Wolmers Boys (J Roberts & F.C. Mercier)
- Calabar High (Mr Brown)

Also in attendance were:

- JFA (Howard Turner)
- W.P.C. Adam

It was decided during this meeting that a separate competition would be created for the urban schools The competition's format was set as round-robin home-away ties, with the team accumulating the maximum number of points at the conclusion of all matches deemed the champions and recipient of the Manning Cup trophy. The new tournament would be endorsed by the then Governor of the island, Sir William Henry Manning K.C.M.G. and referred to as The Manning Cup Football Competition.

The Manning Cup champion would then contest for the Olivier Shield by playing in a two leg tie with Potsdam College.

=== 1914 - Inaugural year ===
At the beginning of the 1914 school year, the following five schools were registered for the Manning Cup competition:

- Jamaica College
- Wolmer's Schools
- Calabar High School
- St. George's College
- New College

The number of entrants were soon reduced however, as New College withdrew early on, leaving the remaining four schools to compete over the course of 12 matches, with the title of champion going to the team accumulating the highest number of points.

== See also ==
- Jamaica High School Football Champions
