= Speaker of the Jamaica House of Representatives =

The Speaker of the House of Representatives is the presiding officer of House of Representatives of Jamaica. Annual salary of the speaker is $JMD 5,500,000. The current speaker is Juliet Holness since 26 September 2023.

== See also ==
- List of speakers of the House of Representatives of Jamaica
