= Talbert Monsell Forrest =

Jamaican politician

Talbert Monsell Forrest (10 October 1923 – January 1999) was a Jamaican politician. He was born in Springfield, St. Mary, Jamaica on 10 October 1923. He was speaker in the House of Representatives from 1980 to 1983. Forrest died in January 1999, at the age of 75.

== See also ==
- List of speakers of the House of Representatives of Jamaica
