= Clarendon College (Jamaica) =

Public school in Chapelton, Clarendon, Jamaica

Location
- Middlesex County; Chapelton, Clarendon; Jamaica
- Coordinates: 18.0878515°N 77.2717166°W

Information
- Type: Public
- Motto: Latin: Perstare et Praestare (Persevere and Excel)
- Patron saint: Rev. Lester Davy
- Opened: 1942-02-02
- Founder: Rev. Lester Davy
- Status: Open
- Chairperson: Mr. Leslie Chung
- Principal: Mr. David Wilson
- Chaplain: Rev. Hyacinth Edwards
- Age range: 12-19
- Enrolment: 1900 Students
- Hours in school day: 7 Hours
- Campus: College
- Campus size: 120 acres (49 ha)
- Houses: Ashberry, Davy, Sharpe, Nichol, Pershadsingh and Harvey
- Colour: Blue/Yellow/White
- Song: We Build Our School
- Athletics: Track and Field, Basketball, Netball, Table Tennis, Football, Cricket
- Sports: Track and Field, Football, Basketball, Netball
- Mascot: A torch
- Nickname: C.C./College
- Rival: Glenmuir High School and Edwin Allen
- Accreditation: Ministry of Education

Clarendon College, commonly called CC, is a high school in the town of Chapelton in northern Clarendon, Jamaica.

== History ==
It is the oldest school in the parish and was founded on 2 February 1942 by the Rev'd. Lester Davy, Minister of Religion of the Congregational Church Union of Jamaica.

Lester Robert Davy was born in 1909, son of Ruth-Ann Eliza Davy (née Phillips) and David S. Davy, of Davyton, Manchester. He originally trained as a teacher at The Mico University College in Kingston, Jamaica. Rev'd. T. Hughes of the Congregational Union of Jamaica convinced Davy to build a school and that he did accomplish at Rose Bank in Chapelton Clarendon.

The school started with only two teachers, Rev. Davy and Mrs. Hyacinth Balford, and ten students, including Davy's nephew, Horace V. Freeman (later, CD, an attorney-at-law). The school was later relocated to its current location on Chapelton Hill. Following Davy'ss tragic death in a train accident at the end of February 1942, the school was administered by Rev'd. and Mrs. T. A. M. Grant. An annual march is held on February 2 to highlight and commemorate the legacy of Rev. Lester Davy.

The current principal of Clarendon College is David Wilson, and its motto reads: "Perstare et Praestare", which means "persevere and excel".

In 2023, the school's football team beat Trinidad & Tobago to win the fourth KFC International School Football tournament.

== Notable alumni ==
- Carlton Gyles, .OVC Professor Emeritus Appointed to Order of Canada
- Lindsay Barrett, novelist, journalist, poet and photographer
- Davina Bennett, model, Miss Universe 2nd runner-up 2017
- Bertram Fraser-Reid
- Minna Israel (former President of RBC Royal Bank Jamaica)
- Andre Russell, West Indies cricketer
- Kaheim Dixon, Charlton Athletic and Jamaica footballer
- Debbie Bisoon, TV Host (Television Jamaica)
- Chinagozi Ugwu-Jibril, epidemiologist who has dedicated her life to improving lives of infants

== See also ==
- Jamaica High School Football Champions
- Education in Jamaica
