= Jehoida McPherson =

Jamaican politician

Jehoida Augustus McPherson

Minister of Labour
- In office 1953–1955
- Monarch: Elizabeth II
- Prime Minister: Sir Alexander Bustamante
- Governor: Sir Hugh Mackintosh Foot
- Succeeded by: Sir Florizel Glasspole

Minister of Education
- In office 1945–1949
- Monarch: George VI
- Governor: Sir John Huggins
- Succeeded by: Joseph Malcolm

Personal details
- Born: January 18, 1900 Westmoreland, Colony of Jamaica, British Empire
- Died: 1963 (aged 62–63)
- Party: Jamaica Labour Party
- Spouse: Beryl Maud (née Clarke) (m. 1934)

Jehoida Augustus McPherson (January 18, 1900 – 1963) was a Jamaican politician, representing the Jamaica Labour Party (JLP) in pre-independent Jamaica. He served as the first Minister of Education (1945-1949) and the first Minister of Labour (1953-1955).

== Early life and education ==
McPherson was born on January 18, 1900, in Bellevue, Westmoreland. He was the son of Eleazer McPherson and his wife, Matilda. McPherson was educated at Kentucky Elementary School, Westmoreland and at Mico College.

== Political career ==
McPherson was elected to the House of Representatives from the newly-created Saint Thomas Western constituency when he defeated Senator Randolph Burke of the People's National Party in the first general election held under adult suffrage on December 14, 1944. McPherson polled 5,990 votes to Burke's 4,044. In 1945, he was appointed to the Executive Council – as established by the new constitution - becoming Jamaica's first Minister of Education. McPherson served as a Member of the Executive Council until 1949. He was succeeded as Minister of Education by Joseph Zachariah Malcolm in 1950. He was again elected from the Saint Thomas Western constituency in the 1949 general election and served until 1955.

In 1953 changes were again made to the constitution which provided for a Chief Minister and seven other Ministers from the House of Representatives. Alexander Bustamante became the first Chief Minister and McPherson served as the first Minister of Labour (1953-1955) in the Bustamante-led Jamaica Labour Party (JLP) administration.

McPherson also served on the Advisory Board Jamaica School of Agriculture, School Board St. Thomas (1945-1946), Jamaica Schools’ Commission (1945-1946), House Committee on Agriculture (1944), Jamaica Union of Teachers, Secretary of the Morant Bay Teachers’ Association and Secretary, Seaforth Branch Jamaica Agriculture Society, and Headmaster of several schools including Unity School, Westmoreland; as we as the Mount Vernon and Seaforth Schools, in St. Thomas.

== Personal life and death ==
McPherson married Beryl Maud (née Clarke) on June 1, 1934. He died in the Princess Margaret Hospital, Morant Bay, St. Thomas, in 1963 at the age of 63.

== See also ==
- List of education ministers of Jamaica
