= John Groves (cricketer) =

Jamaican cricketer (1914–1996)

Personal information
- Full name: John Miller Groves
- Born: 21 July 1914; Kingston, Jamaica
- Died: 19 January 1996 (aged 81); Langley, British Columbia, Canada
- Height: 5 ft 10 in (1.78 m)
- Batting: Right-handed

Domestic team information
- Years: Team
- 1934-35 to 1949-50: Jamaica

Career statistics
Competition	First-class
Matches	5
Runs scored	126
Batting average	15.75
100s/50s	0/0
Top score	38
Balls bowled	138
Wickets	0
Bowling average	–
5 wickets in innings	–
10 wickets in match	–
Best bowling	–
Catches/stumpings	3/2
- Source: Cricket Archive, 28 August 2014

John Miller Groves (21 July 1914 – 19 January 1996) was a Jamaican cricket player and administrator who played first-class cricket for Jamaica from 1935 to 1950.

After attending St George's College in Kingston, Groves worked as an accountant. He played two first-class matches as an opening batsman for Jamaica against MCC in 1934-35, and one as a middle-order batsman and wicket-keeper against the touring Yorkshire team in 1935-36. After the war, he captained a young Jamaican team on its two-match tour of Trinidad in 1949-50, making his highest first-class score of 38 in the second match, batting at number four. He also captained a Jamaica Colts side against British Guiana in a five-day non-first-class match in 1956-57.

Groves later served as Secretary to the West Indies Cricket Board of Control. He also represented Jamaica at football and was a football referee.

Groves was a Roman Catholic. He married Irma Maxwell in 1940, and they had a son and a daughter. He died in Langley, British Columbia, Canada, in 1996.
