= List of speakers of the House of Representatives of Jamaica =

Speaker of the House of Representatives

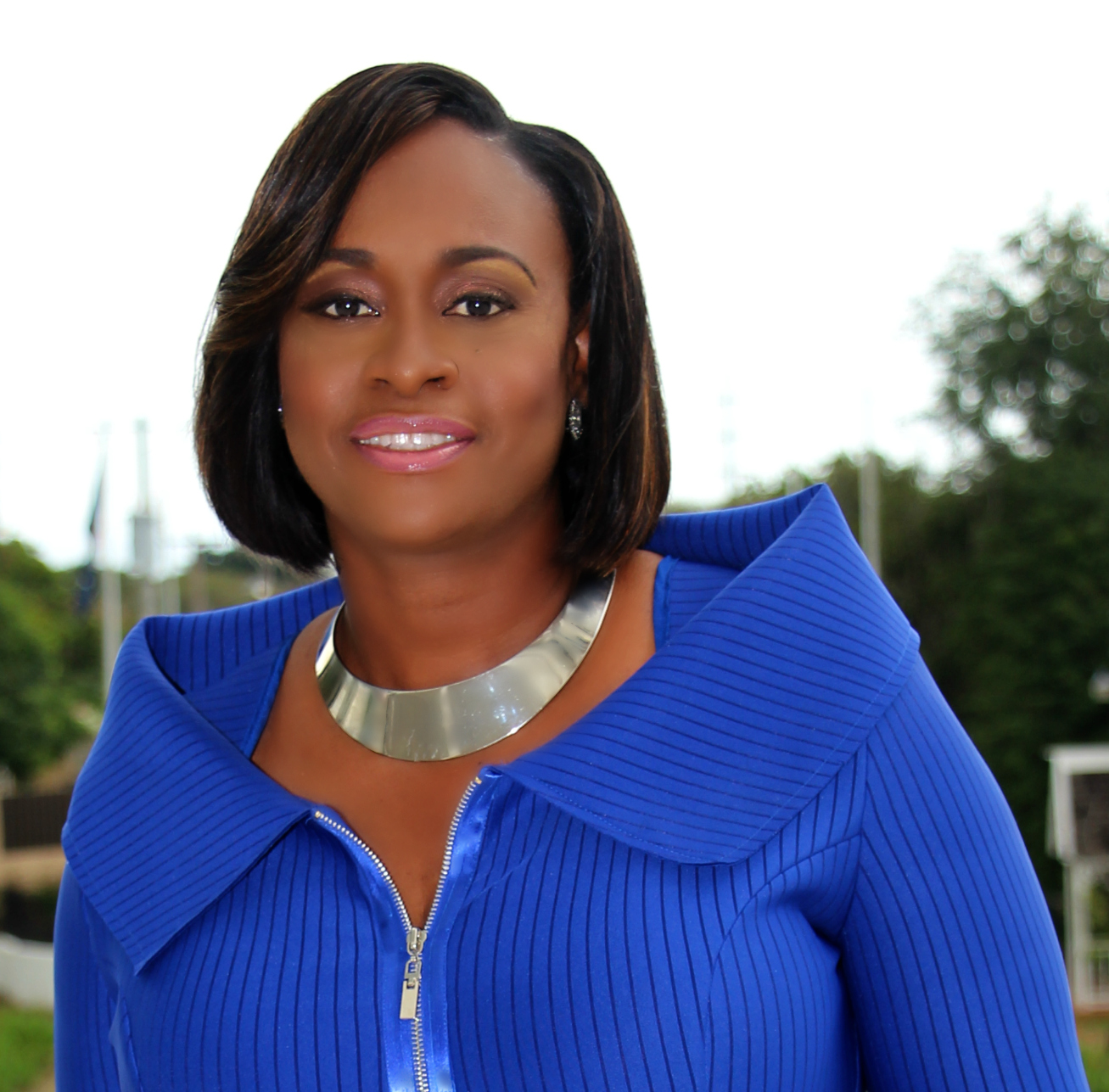
- Incumbent; Juliet Holness since September 2023
- Type: Speaker
- Member of: House of Representatives
- Seat: Kingston
- Term length: 5 years; renewable
- Constituting instrument: Constitution of Jamaica
- First holder: Felix Veitch
- Deputy: Deputy Speaker of the House of Representatives
- Salary: $JMD 5,500,000

This is a list of speakers of the House of Representatives of Jamaica. Speaker is the presiding officer of House of Representatives of Jamaica. Annual salary of the speaker is $JMD 5,500,000.

Below is a list of office-holders, starting from 1945:

No.	Name	Party	Took office	Left office
1	Felix Gordon Veitch	Labour	January 1, 1945	1947
2	Clement Mullings Aitchison	Labour	1947	1950
3	Clifford Campbell	Labour	1950	1955
4	Burnet Birthwright (BB) Coke	People's National	1955	1962
5	Tacius Golding	Labour	1962	1967
6	Eugene Condell Leonard Parkinson	Labour	1967	1972
7	Ripton MacPherson	People's National	February 1972	October 1980
8	Talbert Monsell Forrest	Labour	1980	1983
9	Alva Ross	Labour	1983	1989
10	Headly Cunningham	People's National	1989	1993
11	Carl Marshall	People's National	1993	1997
12	Violet Nielson	People's National	1997	2003
13	Michael Peart	People's National	2003	2007
14	Delroy Chuck	Labour	September 27, 2007	July 13, 2011
15	Marisa Dalrymple-Philibert	Labour	July 13, 2011	December 12, 2011
(13)	Michael Peart	People's National	January 17, 2012	February 5, 2016
16	Pearnel Charles, Sr.	Labour	March 10, 2016	August 11, 2020
(15)	Marisa Dalrymple-Philibert	Labour	September 15, 2020	September 21, 2023
17	Juliet Holness	Labour	September 26, 2023	present
