= Edwin Allen =

Jamaican politician

The Honourable Edwin Leopold Allen OJ JP MP

Minister of Education
- In office 1962–1972
- Monarch: Elizabeth II
- Governors General: Sir Kenneth Blackburne; Sir Clifford Campbell
- Prime Minister: Sir Alexander Bustamante; Sir Donald Sangster; Rt. Hon. Hugh Shearer
- Preceded by: Ivan Lloyd
- Succeeded by: Sir Florizel Glasspole
- In office 1953–1955
- Monarch: Elizabeth II
- Prime Minister: Sir Alexander Bustamante
- Governor: Sir Hugh Mackintosh Foot
- Preceded by: L. L. Simmonds
- Succeeded by: Ivan Lloyd

MP for Clarendon North Western
- In office 1944–1955
- Monarchs: George VI; Elizabeth II

Personal details
- Born: April 17, 1905 St. Andrew, Colony of Jamaica, British Empire
- Died: February 19, 1984 (aged 78)
- Party: Jamaica Labour Party
- Spouse: Edith Monica (née Dale) (m. 1982)
- Education: University of London

Edwin Leopold Allen (April 17, 1905 – February 19, 1984) was a Jamaican politician, representing the Jamaica Labour Party (JLP). He served twice as minister of education (1953-1955) and (1962-1972). He was the first and longest-serving Minister of Education of independent Jamaica.

== Early life and education ==
Allen was born on April 17, 1905, in St. Andrew, Jamaica. He was the son of David Allen and Aneita Celestine Allen (nee Nugent). Allen was educated at Mico College and at the Institute of Education of the University of London, where he received a BA in History, Law and Economics, and was awarded a teaching professional certificate.

== Teaching career ==
Allen served as head teacher (1928-1929) at Mt Felix Elementary School in St. Thomas, Chantily Elementary School, Manchester (1929-1930) and at Leicesterfield Primary School in Clarendon (1931-1950).

== Political career ==
Allen was first elected to the House of Representatives from the Clarendon North Western constituency in the 1950 by-election. In 1953, he was appointed Minister of Education and Social Welfare in the Bustamante-led JLP administration, succeeding L. L. Simmonds. He served in this capacity until 1955, when he was succeeded by Ivan Lloyd of the People's National Party (PNP).

Allen again won the North-West Clarendon seat in the 1955 general election, polling 8,213 votes to the PNP's William Linton, who obtained 7,758 votes. However, he was defeated in the 1959 general election by O. Alphansus Malcolm of the PNP. Allen polled 7,663 vote to Malcolm's 8,125. He went on to serve as Member of the Legislative Council (now Senate) from 1959 to 1962.

The JLP won the 1962 general election, and Allen was returned to Parliament from the North-West Clarendon constituency, polling 8,056 votes to Malcolm's 6,644. He was again appointed minister of education, succeeding Ivan Lloyd, and becoming the first occupant of this position in independent Jamaica. From 1962 to 1972, Allen served as education minister in successive JLP administrations led by Sir Donald Sangster and Hugh Shearer. He was succeeded in this position by the PNP's Sir Florizel Glaspole in 1972.

Allen won the 1972 general election by a 49 vote majority, polling 4,551 votes to 4,455 for Percival Minott of the PNP. He was defeated at the polls in the 1976 general election by Minott who obtained 6,863 votes to Allen's 6,829 (a 34 vote majority). Allen subsequently defeated Minott in the 1980 general election, polling 8,625 votes to Minott's 5,965. He retired from active political life in December 1983.

== Legacy ==
Allen is credited for his pioneering approach to the development of education in Jamaica as outlined in his December 1966 policy paper titled "A New Deal in Education". During Allen's tenure as Minister of Education, secondary education was expanded to an additional 33,000 students and 108 new primary schools were constructed or started. He is credited with securing funding for the construction of the Sam Sharpe Teachers College and, under his watch, tertiary education institutions such as the former College of Arts, Science and Technology saw significant expansion.

== Honors and awards ==
- Allen was posthumously awarded Jamaica’s fourth-highest honour, the Order of Jamaica, in 1984.
- In 1984, the Frankfield Comprehensive High School in Clarendon was renamed the Edwin Allen High School in his honour

== Personal life and death ==
Allen was first married to Mabel Blanche (née Hector) in 1929. His first wife died in 1973. He then married Edith Monica (née Dale) in 1982. Allen died at the University Hospital, Kingston, on February 19, 1984, at the age of 78.

== See also ==
- List of education ministers of Jamaica

Government offices
Preceded by Sir Florizel Glasspole	Minister of Education of Jamaica; 1962–1972	Succeeded by Sir Florizel Glasspole
Preceded by L. L. Simmonds	Minister of Education of Jamaica; 1953–1955	Succeeded by Ivan Lloyd
