= Eugene Condell Leonard Parkinson =

Jamaican politician (1905–1980)

Eugene Condell Leonard Parkinson QC (11 October 1905 – 7 March 1980) was a Jamaican politician. He was speaker in the House of Representatives from 1967 to 1972. He was born at Rock River, Clarendon, Jamaica to Dr Elkanah Walcott Parkinson who was a druggist & chemist at Highgate; St Mary & Elizabeth Sultana Parkinson (née Warmington) who came from Macca Tree, St Catherine. He followed in his fathers footsteps becoming a druggist and Chemist in Annotto Bay after leaving St. George's College, Jamaica in 1924, he also completed a tour of private tuition. He decided that being a chemist was not for him and departed for England to study law in 1943 and was called to the Bar London's inner Temple- three years later on July 3, 1946 - counsel. Fours years later he became a Jamaica Labour Party adherent for Southern St Andrew, he represented the people well and became speaker of the parliament which he held with distinction for five years. His reach upward in national affairs was spectacular, he became a life member of the common wealth parliamentary association, he was president of the Jamaica branch in 1970 at the same time he was appointed a member of the international commission of Juries. Mr speaker then held Jamaica's flag high not only from his chair in parliament but from the international scene, for example he had gone on a visit as a guest of the Israeli government and parliament to Israel. He made international news by berating the Russians for their deplorable act of imposing the death sentence upon two Jews who had attempted to hijack a plane to fly them out of iron curtain incineration & to freedom .

== See also ==
- List of speakers of the House of Representatives of Jamaica
