= Juliet Holness =

Speaker of the Jamaican House of Representatives since 2023

The Most Honourable Juliet Holness MP
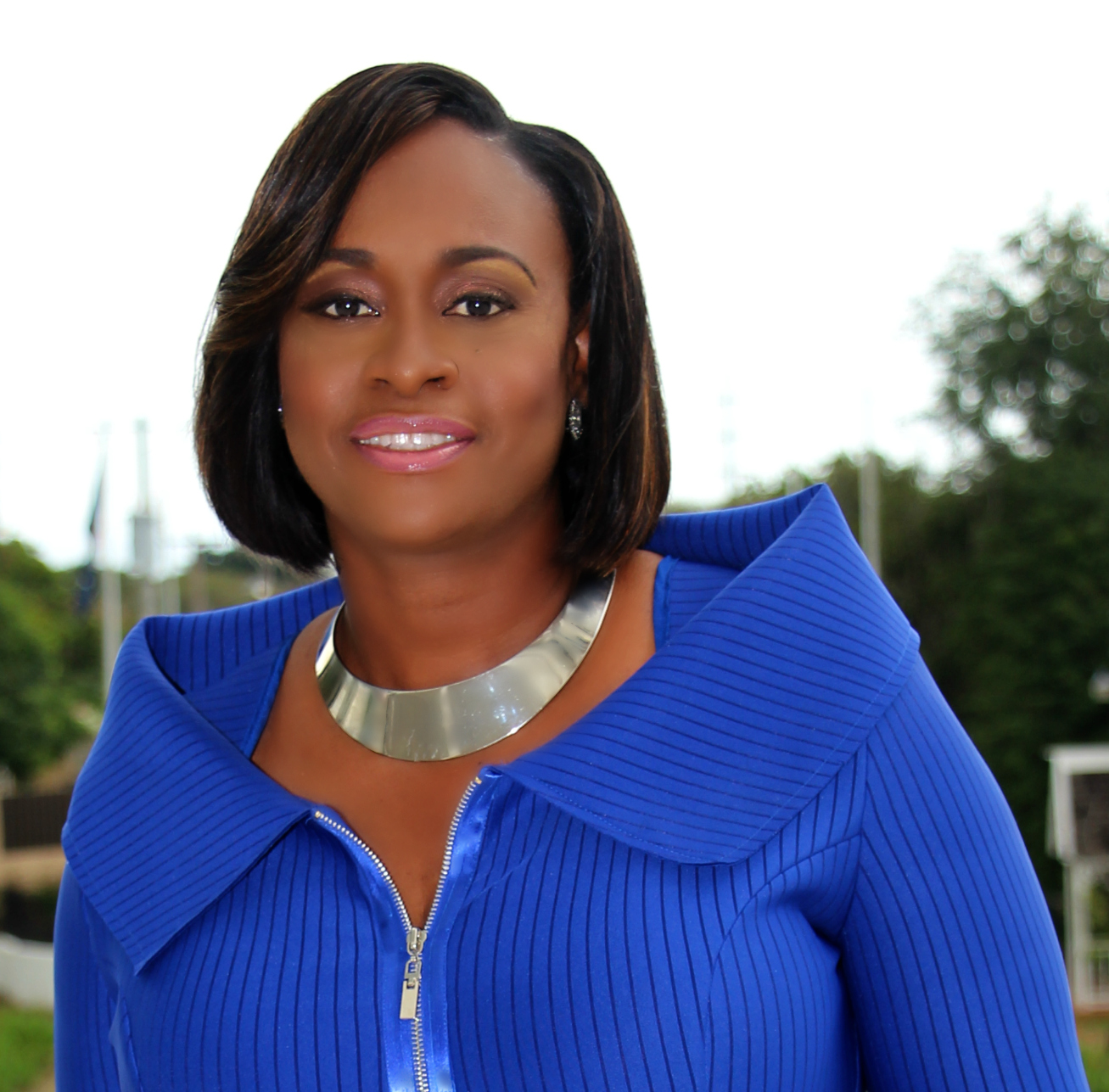
- Holness in 2016

Speaker of the Jamaica House of Representatives
- Incumbent
- Assumed office 26 September 2023
- Deputy: Heroy Clarke
- Preceded by: Marisa Dalrymple-Philibert

Member of Parliament
- Incumbent
- Assumed office 3 March 2016
- Preceded by: Damion Crawford
- Constituency: St. Andrew East Rural

Personal details
- Born: Juliet Ann Marie Landell; July 16, 1971 (age 55) St. Catherine Parish, Jamaica
- Party: Jamaica Labour Party
- Spouse: Andrew Holness (m. 1997)
- Children: 2

Juliet Ann Marie Holness (née Landell; born July 16, 1971) is a Jamaican politician, who currently serves as the Speaker of the Jamaica House of Representatives and Member for Saint Andrew East Rural. She is married to Andrew Holness, the Prime Minister of Jamaica.

== Early life and education ==
Holness was born in Spanish Town, St. Catherine to Stephen and Alverga Landell members of the Seventh-day Adventist Church, she is the oldest child of six. She attended St. Catherine High School and pursued Sixth form studies at Wolmers' Girls' School. She graduated with a bachelor's degree in accounting and economics, and a master's degree in accounting, both degrees from the University of the West Indies, Mona.

== Professional career ==
Holness' first full-time job after graduating was with KPMG, a multinational professional services and accounting firm. Speaking in 2021, she said: "I got a promotion about every six months, which was unprecedented, because I saw the company as my company. I was always very aggressive about collecting their money."

In 1997, she joined PricewaterhouseCoopers (PwC) and worked her way up to the role of senior auditor before leaving when she was pregnant with her first child. Afterwards, she worked for a period as an accountant for Jamaica Biscuit Company.

Holness was also a fellow of the Association of Chartered Certified Accountants. She has also worked as a freelance accounting consultant, real estate developer, and financial controller.

== Political career ==
After her husband, became Prime Minister of Jamaica in 2016, Holness announced the launch of the Save Our Boys Foundation, which was aimed at helping street boys.

Holness was elected to Parliament in 2016 and was re-elected in 2020 and 2025. In 2023, she was elected Speaker.

== Personal life ==
In 1997 she married Andrew Holness, whom she had met as a student at St. Catherine High School during the 1980s. They have two sons, Adam born in 2002 and Matthew born in 2004.
