= Trevor Munroe =

Jamaican Civil Society Advocate

- Born: 10 December 1944 (age 81); Kingston, Jamaica
- Office: Political Scientist & Civil Society Advocate

Trevor Munroe (born 10 December 1944) is an international governance consultant and founding director of National Integrity Action, Jamaica's chapter of Transparency International. He has served as senator in the Jamaican Parliament and leader of the Jamaica labor movement. He is a political scientist and civil society advocate and one of Jamaica's most sought after presenters and keynote speakers by private sector organisations, civil society bodies and public sector entities in Jamaica and the Caribbean

== Early life ==
Born in Kingston, Jamaica, Munroe's early educational foundation was laid at Morris-Knibb Preparatory School and at St. George's College (Class of 1959) where he represented the school and excelled in academics, drama, debating and track athletics. His doctoral dissertation produced a study of the process of decolonization in Jamaica between the 1930s and 1960s, published as The Politics of Constitutional Decolonization in 1972.

== Academic and administrative career ==
He has authored and/or co-authored 10 books and has published scholarly works on Caribbean democratic governance, taught thousands of students, founded the UWI Centre for Leadership and Governance.

== Civil society advocate ==
In the 1970s and 1980s, Munroe was a prominent figure on the Jamaica and Caribbean left.

== Public service ==
In Jamaica's 2015 National Honours, Munroe was awarded the Order of Distinction, Commander Class (CD).

== Personal life ==
He is the elder son of Jamaica's former director of public prosecutions, the late Huntley Munroe Q.C. and his wife Muriel, a florist. Munroe is married to life insurance executive Ingrid, who was the founding president and CEO of Excel Insurance Brokers and is herself a graduate of the Brooklyn College and the University of the West Indies. He has two children, son Tarik and step-daughter Kinshasa Minot, both of whom are alumni of the University of the West Indies and Nova Southeastern University. His son Tarik is a business change manager, and Kinshasa now the CEO of Excel Insurance Brokers. Each holds master's degrees in human resource development. Munroe is also the grandfather of Cairo and Alexandria, both currently undergraduate students at San Diego University and the South Carolina Institute of Architecture & Design respectively.
