= Mona High School =

School in Jamaica

Coordinates: 18.0127°N 76.7578°W

Mona High School is a high school in Saint Andrew Parish, Jamaica.

In 2015 the school reportedly had about 1,200 students, and in 2018, the school self-reported that it had 1,460 students.

Five students and a teacher were injured in an explosion in a chemistry lab at the school in 2018.

Keven Jones is the school's principal. In February 2018, 260 "unruly" students were sent home. In turn, all male classes were created and additional training and meetings were held to improve the educational results for male students at the school.

Shenseea is an alumnus of the school.
