= Neville Eden Gallimore =

Jamaican politician

Neville Eden Gallimore CD is a Jamaican politician who served as a member of the Parliament of Jamaica for South West St. Ann for over 30 years. He is a member of the Jamaica Labour Party and a Seventh-day Adventist. While in office, he was known for his slogan "God first, Jamaica second and my party third."

== Career ==
Gallimore was first elected to parliament in 1967, becoming the then youngest member of the Jamaican Parliament. He served as the Parliamentary Secretary for Foreign Affairs from 1969-1972, Minister of State for Foreign Affairs and Foreign Trade between 1980 and 1984, Minister of Social Security from 1984-1986 and finally as Minister of Education from 1986 to 1989.

=== Accomplishments ===
- Initiated Food Stamp Programme as Minister of Social Security
- Founded University Council of Jamaica as Minister of Education
- Founded National Assessment Programme as Minister of Education, a precursor to the Grade Six Achievement Test (GSAT)

== Awards and honors ==
Gallimore was awarded the Commander of the Order of Distinction by the Jamaican government in 1987. The government of Columbia also awarded him the Order of the Nation, one of the nation's highest honors.

== Education ==
A medical doctor, Gallimore graduated from Pacific Union College in 1961 with his undergraduate degree. He has received honorary degrees from Andrews University and Northern Caribbean University.

== See also ==
- List of education ministers of Jamaica
