= Ajilo Elogu Maria Goretti =

Ugandan politician

- Born: 26 June 1963 (age 62); Kaberamaido
- Occupations: politician legislator

Ajilo Elogu Maria Goretti born 26 June 1963, is a Ugandan female politician and legislator. She represents the people of Kaberamaido as the district woman representative in the Parliament of Uganda.

== See also ==
- Parliament of Uganda
- Kaberamaido District
- List of members of the tenth Parliament of Uganda
- Luweero District
