= Goretti Nassanga =

Ugandan academic

- Born: 1957 (age 68–69); Mukono District, Uganda
- Citizenship: Ugandan
- Education: Makerere University (Bachelor of Arts in Social Work and Social Administration) (Doctor of Philosophy in Journalism and Communication); University of Wales (Master of Journalism)
- Years active: 1979–present
- Known for: Journalism, Media and Communication; Higher Education Administration; Governance
- Title: professor & Dean, Faculty of Journalism, Media and Communication at Makerere University

Goretti Linda Nassanga is a Ugandan journalist, academic and academic administrator, who serves as professor and Dean, Faculty of Journalism and Communication at Makerere University.

== Background and education ==
Nassanga was born in Mukono District, in the Buganda Region of Uganda circa 1957. She attended Naggalama Primary School, then Mount Saint Mary's College Namagunga, where she obtained her High School Diploma.

She was admitted to Makerere University, Uganda's oldest and largest public university, where she graduated with Bachelor of Arts in Social Work and Social Administration in 1979. Later, in 1992 she was admitted to the University of Wales, graduating with a Master of Journalism degree in 1993. In 2003, she graduated from Makerere University with a Doctor of Philosophy in Journalism and Communication.

== Career ==
Nassanga's first job out of university in 1979, was as an information officer at the then Uganda Ministry of Information. There, she wrote stories for the Uganda News Agency which would air on Radio Uganda and Uganda Television. Initially, she was posted at the general desk, where she covered a number of assignments. Later, she was deployed to Parliament as a reporter. In time, she rose to head the Parliament Desk. After that, she joined the Presidential Press Unit as a reporter, eventually becoming the head of the Presidential Press Unit.

In 1989 Nassanga retired from active journalism and took up a teaching position at the School of Journalism at the Institute of Public Administration (now Uganda Management Institute). In 1992, she left to pursue a Master of Journalism degree from the University of Wales, in Cardiff, United Kingdom.

When she returned to Uganda in 1993, she joined Makerere University as a lecturer in journalism. In 1998, she became the head of the newly created Department of Journalism at the university. In 2003, she graduated with a Doctor of Philosophy from Makerere, becoming the first PhD graduate from the department. On 29 July 2016, Nassanga became a professor, and as of September 2019, was the only professor at the department.

== Other considerations ==
Professor Nassanga has published extensively in peer-reviewed journals and contributed chapters in various books. Her subject matter has included gender, media and development, development communication, environment communication, health communication, media ethics, regulation and communication policies, peace journalism, ICT and new media.

== See also ==
- List of universities in Uganda
- Monica Chibita
