= Goretti Masadde =

Ugandan corporate executive

- Born: Uganda
- Citizenship: Uganda
- Education: Makerere University (BSc in Food Science and Technology); The Chartered Institute of Marketing (Postgraduate Diploma in Marketing)
- Occupations: Food Scientist, Entrepreneur and Corporate Executive
- Years active: 1990 – present
- Known for: Administrative skills
- Title: CEO of The Uganda Institute of Banking and Financial Services

Goretti Masadde is currently the chief executive officer of the Uganda Institute of Banking and Financial Services, based in Kampala, Uganda's capital city. She took up her assignment at the institute in March 2020. She concurrently serves as a director of Nutreal Limited, a manufacturer and distributor of healthy snack foods, a company she co-founded in 2010.

== Education ==
She attended Mount Saint Mary's College Namagunga for her A-Level education. She studied at Makerere University, Uganda's oldest and largest public university, graduating with a Bachelor of Science degree in Food Science and Technology. She also holds a Postgraduate Diploma in Marketing, awarded by The Chartered Institute of Marketing, in the United Kingdom.

== Work experience ==
Her first employment position after graduating from Makerere University was as a Brewer with Uganda Breweries Limited, the Ugandan subsidiary of Diageo. While there, she served as brand manager for Bell Lager. She is reported to have been the first practicing female brewer in Uganda and East Africa, at that time.

She served as the Director of Marketing, Communications and Sales at Program For Accessible Health Communication and Education (PACE), a Ugandan non-government organisation (NGO), affiliated with Population Services International. Goretti served as the Head of Corporate Communications at Global Trust Bank between 2008 and 2011. From there, she worked and Head of Corporate Communications and Product Development at Orient Bank from 2011 until 2013.

For a period of time she served as a private business consultant at More Limited, focusing on the areas of marketing and communications. From 2010 until 2013, she served as the President of the Public Relations Association of Uganda (PRAU), a professional industry association for PR practitioners in Uganda. She served as the first female president of that organisation.

In 2010, Goretti and Dorothy Nakimbugwe, an academic in the Department of Food Technology and Nutrition at Makerere University, co-founded Nutreal Uganda Limited, a company that manufactures "affordable, innovative nutrient-enhanced foods". Goretti serves as a director for that enterprise.

On 16 March 2020, Goretti started work as the chief executive officer of the Uganda Institute of Banking and Financial Services, replacing Anthony A. Mulindwa, who served as the CEO of UIBFS since February 2016.

== Other considerations ==
Goretti is a member of the Rotary Club of Kisugu–Victoria View, in Kampala's Makindye Division. She is a married mother of three children, two daughters and one son.

== See also ==
- Anne Juuko
- Sarah Arapta
