= Andrew Holness =

Prime Minister of Jamaica (2011–2012; since 2016)

The Most Honourable Andrew Holness ON PC MP
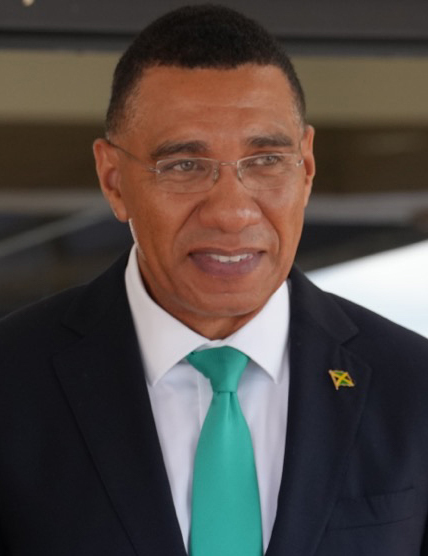
- Holness in 2025

9th Prime Minister of Jamaica
- Incumbent
- Assumed office 3 March 2016
- Monarchs: Elizabeth II; Charles III
- Deputy: Horace Chang
- Governor-General: Sir Patrick Allen
- Preceded by: Portia Simpson-Miller
- In office 23 October 2011 – 5 January 2012
- Monarch: Elizabeth II
- Deputy: Kenneth Baugh
- Governor-General: Sir Patrick Allen
- Preceded by: Bruce Golding
- Succeeded by: Portia Simpson-Miller

Leader of the Opposition
- In office 5 January 2012 – 3 March 2016
- Prime Minister: Portia Simpson-Miller
- Preceded by: Portia Simpson-Miller
- Succeeded by: Portia Simpson-Miller

Leader of the Jamaica Labour Party
- Incumbent
- Assumed office 20 November 2011
- Preceded by: Bruce Golding

Minister of Education
- In office 11 September 2007 – 1 January 2012
- Prime Minister: Bruce Golding; Himself
- Preceded by: Maxine Henry-Wilson
- Succeeded by: Ronald Thwaites

Member of Parliament for Saint Andrew West Central
- Incumbent
- Assumed office 18 December 1997

Chairman of the Caribbean Community
- In office 1 July 2025 – 31 December 2025
- Preceded by: Mia Mottley
- Succeeded by: Terrance Drew

Personal details
- Born: Andrew Michael Holness; 22 July 1972 (age 54) Spanish Town, St. Catherine, Jamaica
- Party: Jamaica Labour
- Spouse: Juliet Landell (m. 1997)
- Children: 2
- Education: St. Catherine High School; University of the West Indies, Mona (BSc, MSc); Northeastern University (DLP)

Andrew Michael Holness, ON PC MP (born 22 July 1972) is a Jamaican politician who has served as Prime Minister of Jamaica since 3 March 2016, having previously served from 2011 to 2012, and as leader of the Jamaica Labour Party (JLP) since 2011.

Holness previously served as prime minister from 23 October 2011 to 5 January 2012. He succeeded Bruce Golding as prime minister and decided to go to the polls in the 29 December 2011 general election in an attempt to get his own mandate from the Jamaican electorate. He failed in that bid, however, losing to the People's National Party led by Portia Simpson-Miller, with the PNP gaining 42 seats to the JLP's 21. Following that defeat, Holness served as Leader of the Opposition from January 2012 to March 2016, when he once again assumed the position of prime minister. In 2020, the Labour Party won a landslide in another general election, and on 7 September Holness was sworn in for another term as prime minister.

In October 2011, at the age of 39, Holness became the youngest person ever to be prime minister in Jamaica's history. In March 2016, aged 43, he became the youngest to ever be elected prime minister. He is also the first head of government to receive a doctorate degree while serving in office, at present, the only currently serving head of state to have completed a doctorate degree while serving in office. He is the first prime minister to have been born after Jamaica gained independence in 1962. He is currently the longest-serving prime minister from the Jamaica Labour Party.

== Early life and education ==
In 1997, Holness described his father as "a thinker and an academic socialist" and his mother as "pragmatic and frugal." He grew up in Ensom City, Spanish Town, and attended St Catherine High School. At school, he was a noted debater and became head boy and valedictorian. After graduating, he taught at the school for a year, and at the age of 19 he began his undergraduate studies at the University of the West Indies, Mona, and later graduated with a Bachelor of Science degree in Management Studies.

After completing his degree, Holness worked as executive director of the Voluntary Organization for Uplifting Children (VOUCH) from 1994 to 1996. It was there that he met Edward Seaga, at that time the leader of the Jamaica Labour Party (JLP). During his time at VOUCH, Holness completed a Master of Science (MSc) degree in Development Studies at the University of the West Indies. Holness joined the Premium Group of Companies, led by Seaga, and worked as his special assistant and financial manager.

In 2024, Holness completed a Doctor of Law and Policy degree at Northeastern University in Boston, Massachusetts, a type of professional doctorate. His thesis focused on the impact of American gun laws on violence in Jamaican society.

== Early political career ==
Holness joined the Jamaica Labour Party (JLP) in 1992, and became actively involved from 1993, while a student at the University of the West Indies.

Holness was announced as the JLP candidate in St Andrew West Central constituency in October 1997, ahead of the 1997 general election in December. He was the youngest candidate in the election, at age 25. In his constituency, he was running against Warren Blake of the People's National Party (PNP) and Steve Daley of the National Democratic Movement (NDM). After the initial count, Holness was the projected winner of the seat. However, when the Electoral Office of Jamaica (EOJ) released the full results in late December, they did not announce a winner in St Andrew West Central, as there were several irregularities, including missing boxes of vote and ballots spoiled after the initial count. On 28 December, Holness was declared winner of the seat, although the matter was not considered settled. Holness was sworn in as member of parliament on 24 February 1998, delayed by a magisterial recount. On 5 March 1998, he lost the seat, as the Election Court had ordered a re-election, which was held on 26 March.

Blake won the re-election, however, due to more irregularities, including voter intimidation and corrupt electoral management at four polling stations, the re-election was overturned in those districts. In the second re-election on 31 June, Blake required 735 votes to beat Holness, but only garnered 688, so Holness was declared the winner of the seat. Shortly after entering the house, Holness was appointed as the opposition spokesperson on land, development, and housing, and he became a member of the economy and production and infrastructure and physical development committees.

Holness retained his seat in the 2002 general election. In 2002, he switched portfolio to Housing and then Education in 2005. Holness became Minister of Education in the cabinet of Bruce Golding in 2007.

== Prime Minister of Jamaica (2011–2012; 2016–) ==
=== Election and appointment ===
On 5 December 2011, Holness called an election set for 29 December 2011. The JLP campaigned in its strongholds, and Holness highlighted the accomplishments during the four years of JLP government, such as economic growth and crime reduction, which the JLP said the PNP failed to do during its own eighteen years' rule of the country. The JLP, however, lost the election to the PNP, which gained a large majority of 42 to the JLP's 21 parliamentary seats. Portia Simpson-Miller and the PNP returned to power. The voter turnout was 53.17%.

He succeeded Bruce Golding as both leader of the JLP and prime minister on 23 October 2011, making him the ninth person to hold the office. As prime minister, he chose to retain the education portfolio. In February 2023, a commission cleared him of corruption allegations of which he was accused.

=== 2016 election and re-appointment ===
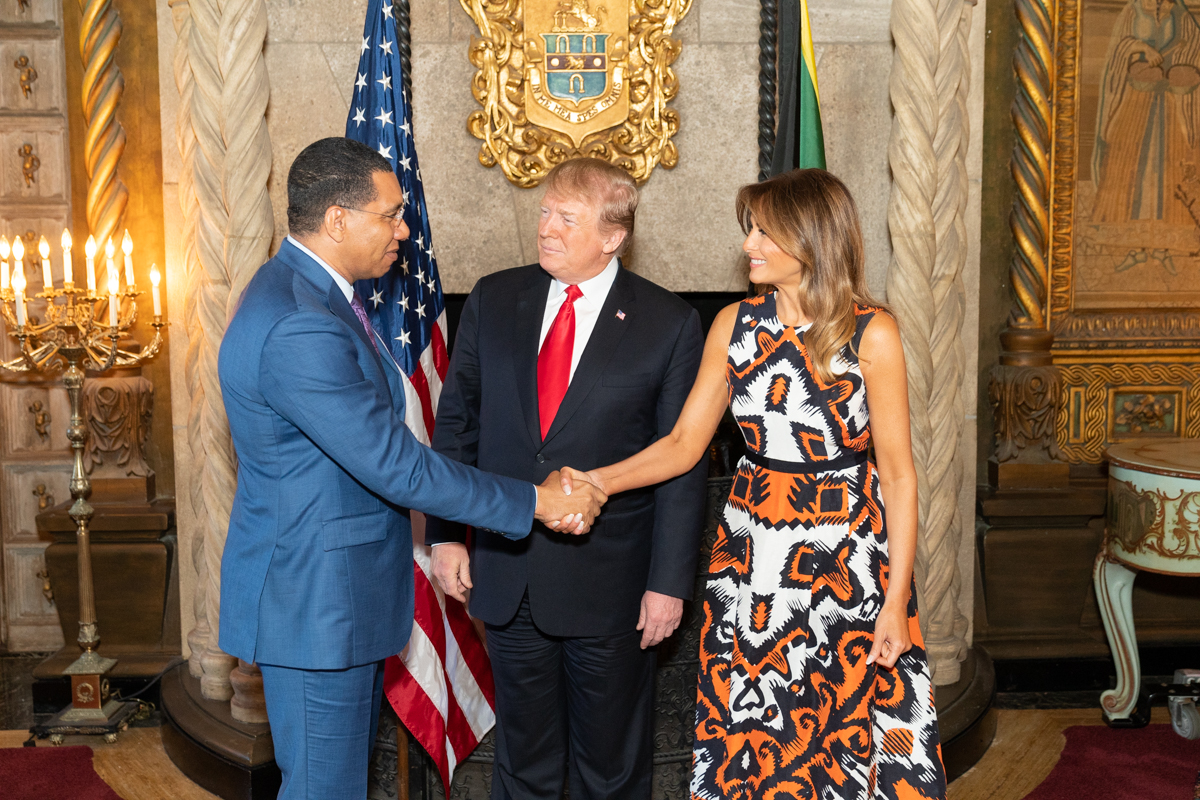
Holness meets with U.S. President and First Lady, Donald and Melania Trump, 2019

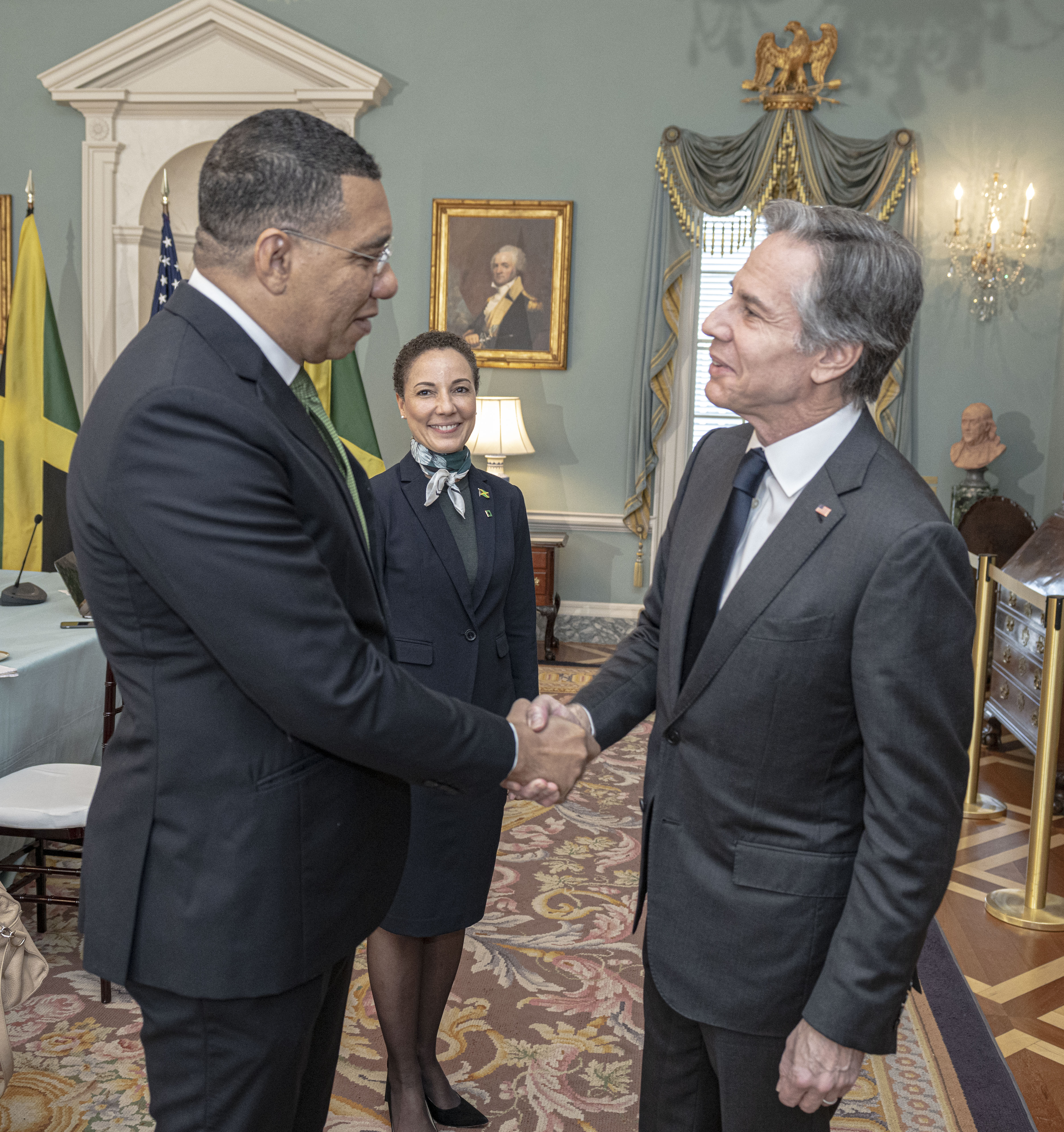
Andrew Holness meeting with United States Secretary of State Antony Blinken on 1 April 2022

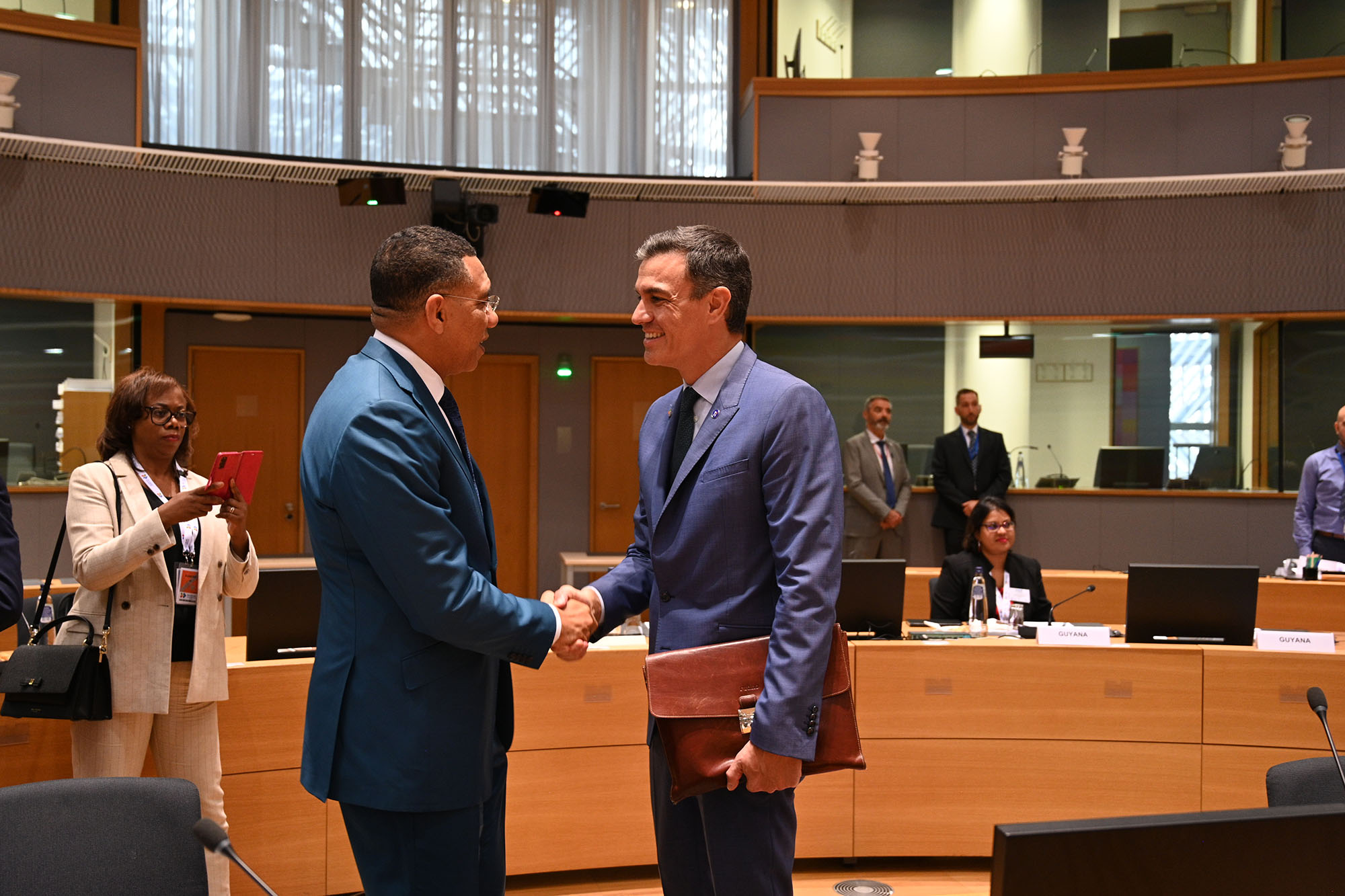
Holness with Prime Minister of Spain, Pedro Sanchez, 2023

On 25 February 2016, the JLP won the 2016 election winning 32 seats compared to 31 seats for the incumbent PNP. His wife Juliet also won a seat in parliament, the first time a prime minister or opposition leader and their spouse sat simultaneously in the Parliament of Jamaica. As a result, Simpson-Miller became Opposition Leader for a second time. The voter turnout dipped below 50% for the first time, registering just 48.37%.

=== 2020 election ===
On 3 September 2020, Holness led the JLP to a second consecutive general election victory, but this time by a much larger margin. The JLP won 49 seats, as compared to the 14 seats for the PNP. However, the turnout was just 37%, probably affected by the coronavirus pandemic. With this victory, he became the youngest person in Jamaica's history to be elected twice. He was sworn in for another term on 7 September 2020.

=== Republicanism ===
During the Duke and Duchess of Cambridge's tour of Jamaica in March 2022, on behalf of the Jamaican monarch, Queen Elizabeth II, and as part of the celebrations of the 70th anniversary of her accession, Holness told the royal couple that their nation was "moving on and we intend to attain in short order our development goals and fulfill our true ambitions as an independent, developed, prosperous country".

=== 2025 election ===
On 3 September 2025, Holness led the JLP to a third consecutive general election victory, winning 35 of 63 seats in parliament against the PNP's 28. The voter turnout was 39.5%.

=== Hurricane Melissa ===
In late October 2025, Jamaica was hit by Hurricane Melissa, a Category 5 hurricane which had been credited with "turning Jamaica into a disaster area". The majority of the country was left without power during and after the hurricane. Holness told CNN that it was "clear that wherever the eye of the hurricane hit, there would be devastating impacts".

Hurricane Melissa made landfall in New Hope, Westmoreland, as a Category 5 hurricane, in the strongest landfall Jamaica has ever recorded, surpassing Hurricane Gilbert, which made landfall in eastern Jamaica as a low-end Category 4 hurricane in 1988.

By 29 October, the Jamaican minister for Local Government and Community Development, Desmond McKenzie, confirmed four deaths as a result of the hurricane making landfall over Jamaica, saying that he was "saddened to announce" that three men and one woman were "discovered after being washed up by the flood waters generated by the hurricane".

Holness describe the situation in the south east and south west of the country as "serious damage and total devastation" following an aerial tour of the area. He described the situation to BBC News as having "sheared off between 80-90% of roofs, wrecked police stations and libraries and razed local infrastructure". A number of Parish churches across the island were severely damaged, with Holness describing Jamaica as "resilient" and that the country "will recover". Facing widespread devastation across the country, other nations, including the United Kingdom, announced packages of humanitarian aid to help in relief efforts.

== Personal life ==
In 1997 he married Juliet Holness (née Landell), an accountant, whom he had met as a student at St. Catherine High School during the 1980s. The couple have two children, Adam and Matthew.

He is a member of the Seventh-day Adventist Church.

== Honours ==
=== National honours ===
- Jamaica:
  - Member of the Order of the Nation

=== Foreign honours ===
- Dominican Republic:
  - Grand Cross with Gold Breast Star of the Order of Merit of Duarte, Sánchez and Mella
- United Kingdom:
  - 26 May 2021: Member of His Majesty's Most Honourable Privy Council (PC)

== See also ==
- Cabinet of Jamaica
- List of current heads of state and government
- List of heads of the executive by approval rating

Political offices
Preceded by Maxine Henry-Wilson	Minister of Education; 2007–2012	Succeeded by Ronald Thwaites
Preceded by Bruce Golding	Prime Minister of Jamaica; 2011–2012	Succeeded by Portia Simpson-Miller
Preceded by Portia Simpson-Miller	Leader of the Opposition; 2012–2016	Succeeded by Portia Simpson-Miller
Preceded by Portia Simpson-Miller	Prime Minister of Jamaica; 2016–present	Incumbent
Party political offices
Preceded by Bruce Golding	Leader of the Jamaica Labour Party; 2011–present	Incumbent
