= Ripton MacPherson =

Jamaican politician (1922–2011)

Ripton Stewart MacPherson (18 May 1922 – 20 January 2011) was a Jamaican politician and attorney-at-law. Born in Kingston, he was speaker in the House of Representatives from February 1972 to February 1980.

Mr. Macpherson died after a brief illness on Thursday 20 January 2011 at the Mobay Hope Hospital.

Macpherson was remarried and had 3 children and 5 grandchildren.

== See also ==
- List of speakers of the House of Representatives of Jamaica
