= Florizel Glasspole =

3rd governor-general of Jamaica

The Most Honourable Sir Florizel Glasspole ON CD GCMG GCVO KStJ
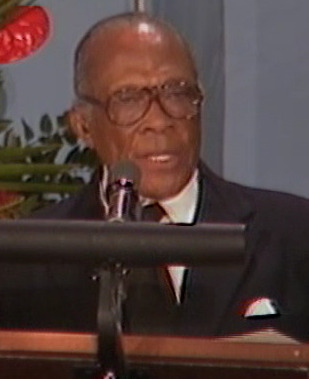
- Florizel Glaspole in 1982

3rd Governor-General of Jamaica
- In office 27 June 1973 – 31 March 1991
- Monarch: Elizabeth II
- Prime Minister: Michael Manley; Edward Seaga
- Preceded by: Herbert Duffus (acting)
- Succeeded by: Edward Zacca (acting)

Minister of Education
- In office 1957–1962
- Preceded by: Ivan Lloyd
- Succeeded by: Edwin Allen
- In office 1972–1973
- Preceded by: Edwin Allen
- Succeeded by: Eli Matalon

MP for Kingston East and Port Royal
- In office 1944–1976
- Succeeded by: William Issacs

Personal details
- Born: Florizel Augustus Glasspole; 25 September 1909 Kingston, Colony of Jamaica, British Empire
- Died: 25 November 2000 (aged 91) Kingston, Jamaica
- Spouse: Ina Josephine Glasspole (m. 1934)
- Children: 1

Sir Florizel Augustus Glasspole ON CD GCMG GCVO KStJ (25 September 1909 – 25 November 2000) was the third and longest-serving governor-general of Jamaica, in office from 1973 to 1991.

== Early life and education ==
Florizel Glasspole was born in Kingston, Jamaica on 25 September 1909. His parents were the Rev. Theophilus A. Glasspole, a Methodist minister, and Florence (née Baxter). Glasspole received his early education at Buff Bay Elementary School in Portland between 1914 and 1918. He then attended Central branch Elementary School and Wolmer's Boys School (1922-1926). In 1946, he enrolled in Ruskin College, Oxford, where he majored in Trade Union Studies on a one-year scholarship awarded by the British Trades Union Congress.

== Career ==
Glasspole's first job was in the Civil Service with the Registrar of Titles Office in 1926. From 1930, he worked as an accounting clerk at the Serge Island Sugar Estate near Seaforth St Thomas. Between 1937 and 1955, Glasspole was general secretary of the Jamaica United Clerks' Association, of the Water Commission Manual Workers' Union, of the Municipal and Parochial General Workers' Union and of the National Workers' Union. He was president of the Jamaica Printers' and Allied Workers' Union, the Machado Employees' Union, and the General Hospital and Allied Workers' Union. Glasspole was also, from 1939 to 1947, General Secretary of the Trades Union Advisory Council and, from 1947 to 1952, General Secretary of the Jamaican Trades Union Congress.

== Politics ==
Glasspole was an early member of the People's National Party, he was elected to the House of Representatives in the first universal suffrage elections, in 1944, from the constituency of Kingston East and Port Royal, and held the seat through every election until his retirement in 1973. From 1955 to 1957 he served as minister of labour and from 1957 to 1962 he was minister of education under Norman Manley before independence. He reprieved the latter role from 1972 to 1973, under Michael Manley.

== Governor-General ==
Florizel Glasspole was appointed to the office of governor-general in 1973. Under the Westminster system, the Jamaican governor-general is appointed by the monarch (currently King Charles III) on the recommendation of the prime minister of Jamaica. He held that office until 1991, when he was succeeded by Howard Cooke.

== Personal life and death ==
Florizel Glasspole was married to Ina Josephine (née Kinlocke) and had one daughter Sara Lou Glasspole-Mena. Glasspole died in Kingston on 25 November 2000, aged 91.

== Awards and decorations ==
Florizel Glasspole Street in Port Royal is named for him.

- Commander of the Order of Distinction (1970)
- Commander of the Order of the Nation (1973)
- Order of Andrés Bello (Venezuela, 1973)
- Knight of the Order of St. John of Jerusalem (1974)
- Order of the Liberator (Venezuela, 1978)
- Knight Grand Cross of the Order of St Michael and St George (1981)
- LL.D. (Hon) University of the West Indies (1982)
- Grand Cross of the Order of Merit of the Federal Republic of Germany (1982)
- Knight Grand Cross of the Royal Victorian Order (1983)

Preceded by Herbert Duffus (acting)	Governor-General of Jamaica; 1973–1991	Succeeded by Edward Zacca (acting)
