= Lisa Hanna =

Jamaican politician and beauty queen, Miss World 1993 winner

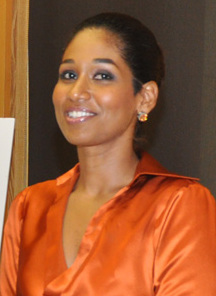

Minister of Youth and Culture
- In office 6 January 2012 – 7 March 2016
- Prime Minister: Portia Simpson-Miller
- Preceded by: Olivia Grange
- Succeeded by: Olivia Grange

Member of Parliament for Saint Ann South Eastern
- In office 11 September 2007 – 3 September 2025
- Preceded by: Aloun Ndombet-Assamba
- Succeeded by: Kenneth Russell

Personal details
- Born: Lisa Rene Shanti Hanna; 20 August 1975 (age 51) Retreat, St Mary, Jamaica
- Party: People's National Party
- Spouses: David Panton (m. 1999; div. 2004) Richard Lake (m. 2017)
- Children: 1
- Education: Queen's School, Jamaica
- Alma mater: University of the West Indies
- Height: 1.74 m (5 ft 9 in)
- Beauty pageant titleholder
- Title: Miss Jamaica World 1993; Miss World 1993
- Hair color: Black
- Eye color: Brown
- Major competitions: Miss Jamaica World 1993 (Winner); Miss World 1993 (Winner) (Miss World Caribbean)

Lisa Rene Shanti Hanna (born 20 August 1975) is a Jamaican politician and beauty queen who was crowned Miss World 1993, becoming the third Jamaican to win the title. A member of the opposition People's National Party, Hanna served as Member of Parliament for Saint Ann South East, and was Jamaica's Minister of Youth and Culture from 2012 to 2016. Hanna was a candidate in the 2020 People's National Party leadership election, following the PNP's defeat at the 2020 Jamaican general election and the subsequent resignation of PNP President and Opposition Leader, Peter Phillips. Hanna was defeated by Mark Golding, receiving 1,444 votes to Golding's 1,740 votes, a difference of 296 votes.

== Early life and education ==
Hanna was born in Retreat, St Mary, to Rene Hanna (of Lebanese descent) and Dorothy Hosang (of African and Chinese descent). She attended Immaculate Conception Preparatory School and The Queen's School, both in Kingston. At the latter, she became Head Girl, and was appointed a Goodwill Ambassador by the United Nations Development Programme.

Hanna attended the University of the West Indies, Mona Campus, where she earned a bachelor's and a master's degree in communications.

== Professional life ==
=== Career in entertainment ===
On Saturday, November 27, 1993, at a glitzy ceremony at the Sun City Resort in South Africa, Lisa won the 1993 Miss World pageant.

In 1998, Hanna acted in the romantic comedy How Stella Got Her Groove Back. In 2003, Hanna tried her hand in broadcasting, hosting a Jamaican talk show Our Voices and was a guest presenter on Xtra in the United States. She returned to her country a year later and was a communications consultant for the Hilton Hotel in New Kingston.

=== Jamaican Parliament ===
On Monday September 3, 2007, on the night of Jamaica's general elections, as a member of the People's National Party, Hanna won the seat for St. Ann South East. Hence, positioning her as a Member of Parliament for that constituency. She is one of the youngest women to be elected to the Jamaican Parliament. In addition to her duties as constituency representative she served as opposition spokesperson on Information, Youth and Culture up to December 2011. In the 29 December 2011 polls her party was elected into power. She was subsequently appointed as Minister of Youth and Culture.

During her tenure as Minister of Youth & Culture, Hanna developed the Green Paper for the National Youth Policy 2015–2030. This policy aimed to address the needs of all young people through partnerships with the public sector, private sector, youth organizations, NGOs, faith-based organizations, academia and with Jamaica’s international development partners.

Under Hanna’s ministry, the National Foster Care programme was revamped, allowing the placement of over 855 children with 800 families.

Hanna’s ministry also bolstered the Ananda Alert System, which allowed 85% of missing children to be returned safely to their homes in August 2013.

In 2016, Hanna shared her strategy for tackling the needs of Jamaican children at a UNICEF conference in New York City. That same year, Jamaica moved up 52 places on the UNICEF Kids Rights Index to be ranked 51 out of 163 countries.

In 2015, Hanna successfully lobbied to have Jamaica’s Blue and John Crow Mountain’s declared a UNESCO World Heritage Site. They became the first UNESCO World Heritage Site for Jamaica.

On November 7, 2020 the PNP elected Mark Golding as its 6th President after he defeated challenger Hanna by 1,740 votes to 1,444 in the 2020 People's National Party leadership election.

In 2021, Hanna became a weekly columnist for the Jamaica Observer, where she opined on an array of topics, from the value-added opportunities of Jamaican Agriculture to her desire to see Bob Marley named National Hero.

In March 2022, Hanna was appointed to APCO Worldwide’s International Advisory Council (IAC). Her role is to expand the Caribbean and Latin American focus in the areas of food security, trade, global economy and matters concerning gender and the security related to gender.

In August 2022, she announced she would not stand in the 2025 general election. She was succeeded by Kenneth Russell.

== Personal life ==
Hanna married David K Panton, in 1999 in New York City. Hanna and Panton had a son, Alexander, born in March 2001. They divorced in 2004 in Atlanta. In December 2017, Hanna married Jamaican businessman Richard Lake in St. Andrew, Jamaica. Together Richard Lake and Lisa Hanna run Lydford Logistics a contract manufacturing, commercial warehouse and shipping operation in Moneague, Jamaica. On April 14, 2026 Hanna launched a global beauty skin care brand aptly named Lisa Hanna Beauty.

== See also ==
- Women in the House of Representatives of Jamaica

Awards and achievements
Preceded by (Russia) Julia Kourotchkina	Miss World; 1993	Succeeded by (India) Aishwarya Rai
Preceded by (The Bahamas) Jody Weech	Miss World Caribbean; 1993	Succeeded by (Cayman Islands) Anita Bush
Preceded by Julie Bradford	Miss Jamaica World; 1993	Succeeded by Johanna Ulett

Political offices
Preceded by Olivia Grange	Minister of Youth and Culture; 2012–2016	Succeeded by Olivia Grange
Preceded by Aloun Ndombet-Assamba	Member of Parliament for Saint Ann South Eastern; 2007–present	Incumbent
