= 2020 People's National Party leadership election =

People's National Party leadership election

- November 7, 2020
Turnout
96% ( 0.0 pp)
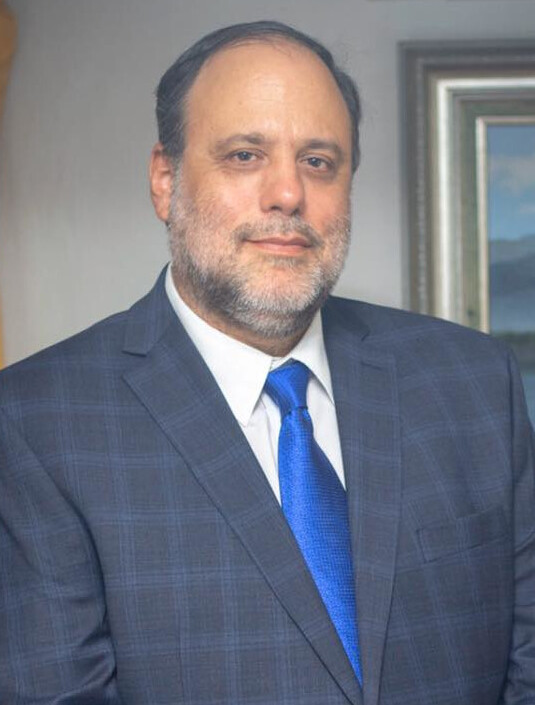

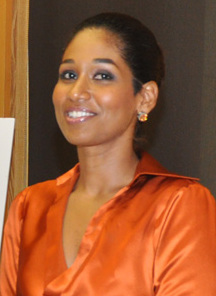
Candidate	Mark Golding	Lisa Hanna
Popular vote	1,740	1,444
Percentage	54.6%	45.4%
Leader before election
Peter Phillips
Elected Leader
Mark Golding

2020 People's National Party leadership election
- Date: November 7, 2020
- Resigning leader: Peter Phillips
- Won by: Mark Golding

The 2020 People's National Party (PNP) leadership election was triggered after Peter Phillips announced his intention to resign as Leader of the People's National Party following the party's defeat at the 2020 general election. It was held on November 7, 2020. If Hanna was elected, she would have served as the second female President of a Jamaican political party and the second female Leader of the Opposition in Jamaican history. The election was won by Former Minister of Justice and Member of Parliament for St Andrew Southern and Attorney Mark Golding who secured 1,740 or 54.6% of the vote.

== Background ==
The announcement of the election date was made on September 27, 2020 at a meeting of the PNP's National Executive Council (NEC) at the Jamaica Conference Centre in Kingston, with nomination date for candidates occurring from October 19 to 23 and a list of the final delegates produced by October 30.

== Declared candidates ==
Roles in bold are currently held.

Candidate	Last political roles	Announced	Campaign Launched	Campaign slogan
**Mark Golding**	**Member of Parliament for Saint Andrew Southern** (since 2017)	22 September 2020	19 October 2020	"Go With Golding"
**Lisa Hanna**	**Member of Parliament for Saint Ann South Eastern** (since 2007)	27 September 2020	5 October 2020	"Bring Back Di Love"

== Results ==
Candidate	Votes	%
Turnout: 96%
**Mark Golding**	**1,740**	**54.6**
Lisa Hanna	1,444	45.4

== Endorsements ==
Leadership candidates were endorsed by various notable politicians and persons representing sectors of civil society.

=== Mark Golding ===
- Luther Buchanan, Former Deputy General Secretary of the PNP
- Gabriela Morris, Senator
- Joan Gordon-Webley, Caretaker MP for East Rural St Andrew and Former Ambassador
- Joseph Matalon, Radio Jamaica Chairman
- Scean Barnswell, Councillor for the Hayes Division in the Clarendon Municipal Corporation
- Noel Arscott, Former Vice President of the PNP and former South West Clarendon MP
- Sheryl Lee Ralph, Jamaican-American Actress
- Garfield Sinclair, Chief Executive Officer of The Bahamas Telecommunications Co. Ltd. and Vice President of Cable & Wireless Communications (Northern Cluster)
- Chris Deering, American Businessman and Marketer
- Patricia Duncan-Sutherland, Caretaker MP for South East Clarendon.
- Angela Brown-Burke, MP for Saint Andrew South Western
- Omar Newell, President of the PNP Patriots
- Lydia Richards, Councillor for the Bensonton Division in South East St Ann
- Peter Bunting, Former PNP General Secretary and Caretaker MP for Manchester Central
- Lambert Weir, Councillor for the Claremont Division in South East St Ann

=== Lisa Hanna ===
- Phillip Paulwell, PNP Vice President
- Wykeham McNeill, PNP Vice President
- Mikael Phillips, PNP Vice President and MP for North West Manchester
- Andre Haughton, Former Opposition Senator, Caretaker for St. James West Central
- Janice Allen, Opposition Senator
- Donovan Mitchell, Mayor of Mandeville, Councillor for Royal Flat Division
- Neville Wright, Councillor, Trench Town Division, St. Andrew South
- Imani Duncan-Price, Caretaker MP for Kingston Central
- Audrey Smith-Facey, Councillor for St. Andrew South Western
- Dwayne Vaz, Former MP for Westmoreland Central, Chairman PNP Region 6
- Dennis Gordron, Councillor for Maxfield Park Division, St Andrew East Central
- Oswest Senior-Smith, Caretaker MP for North Eastern St Catherine
- Patrick Roberts, Councillor for Molynes Division, Caretaker for St. Andrew West Central
- Alrick Campbell, Councillor for Edgewater Division, St. Catherine South Eastern
- Michael Troupe, Councillor for Granville Division, St. James West Central
- Donna Scott-Mottley, Leader of Opposition business in the Senate
- Natalie Neita, MP for North Central St Catherine
- Morais Guy, MP for Central St Mary
- Kenord Grant, Councillor for Bridgeport Division, St. Catherine South East
- Denise Daley, MP for East St Catherine
- Valerie Neita Robertson, Caretaker MP for Portland Western
- Venesha Phillips, Councillor for the Papine Division

== Opinion polling ==
View source data.

Date (Note: These are the survey dates of the poll, or if the survey dates are not stated, the date the poll was released.)	Pollster	Sample size								Lead
Date	Pollster	Sample size	Peter Bunting	Damion Crawford	Mark Golding	Lisa Hanna	Phillip Paulwell	Mikael Phillips	Julian Robinson	Lead
7 Nov 2020	2020 PNP leadership election	–	–	–	**54.6**	45.4	–	–	–	9.2
28-31 October 2020	Lisa Hanna/Blue Dot Data Intelligence Ltd	1,078	–	–	36	**46**	–	–	–	10
24-28 October 2020	Mark Golding/Don Anderson/Market Research Ltd	1,077	–	–	**46**	45	–	–	–	1
19-24 September 2020	People's National Party/Don Anderson/Market Research Ltd	1,061	–	–	26	**34**	5	2	14	**8**
11-13 September 2020	Bill Johnson/Jamaica Observer	1,000	8	–	10	**20**	–	–	–	**10**
3 September 2020		**The PNP loses the 2020 Jamaican general election and Peter Bunting loses his seat**								
21-23 August 2020	Bill Johnson/Jamaica Observer	1,000	**36**	12		17	–	–	–	**19**

== See also ==
- People's National Party
- 2020 Jamaican general election
- Mark Golding
- Lisa Hanna
- Phillip Paulwell
- Peter Bunting
- Damion Crawford
- Peter Phillips (Jamaican politician)
- 2022 Jamaican local elections
