= Reggae Golden Jubilee =

Reggae Golden Jubilee - Origins of Jamaican Music

Compilation album
- Released: 6 November 2012
- Genres: Reggae, lovers rock, ska, rocksteady, roots, dancehall
- Label: VP Records

Reggae Golden Jubilee (official album title: Reggae Golden Jubilee - Origins of Jamaican Popular Music) is a compilation album that commemorates Jamaica’s 50th anniversary of independence. It was released on 6 November 2012. Reggae Golden Jubilee included four CDs featuring Jamaica's top 100 hit songs and a 64-page booklet of notation with iconic photographs.

The album featured ska, rocksteady, reggae, roots reggae and dancehall with established musicians and younger artists, such as Millie Small, Bob Marley & The Wailers, Eric Donaldson, Dawn Penn, Buju Banton, Sizzla, Beenie Man, Sean Paul, Damian "Jr. Gong" Marley, Shaggy, and Mavado among others.

The tracks were selected by Edward Seaga, a former Prime Minister of Jamaica, who also wrote the liner notes and the track notations. Seaga is also well known as the founder of the music label West Indies Records Limited (WIRL), and was associated in the development of the Jamaican music industry at large.

== Executive producers ==
Edward Seaga, Chris Chin

== Track listing ==
=== Disc 1 ===
No.	Title	Writer(s)	Producer(s)	Length
1.	"Easy Snapping" – Theophilus Beckford"	Theophilus Beckford	Clement Seymour Dodd
2.	"Dumplins" – Byron Lee & The Dragonaires"	Doc Bagby / Irving Nahan	Byron Lee
3.	"Manny Oh aka Oh Manny Oh" – Higgs & Wilson"	Joe Higgs / Ron Wilson	Edward Seaga
4.	"Oh Carolina" – Folkes Brothers"	John Folkes	Prince Buster
5.	"They Got To Go" – Prince Buster & The All Stars"	Cecil Eustace Campbell	Prince Buster
6.	"Independent Jamaica" – Lord Creator"	Kenrick Randolph Patrick	Vincent "Randy" Chin
7.	"Blackhead Chinaman" – Prince Buster & The All Stars"	Cecil Eustace Campbell	Prince Buster
8.	"Blazing Fire" – Derrick Morgan"	Derrick S. Morgan	Leslie Kong
9.	"Wash Wash" – Prince Buster & The All Stars"	Haven Gillespie / Beasley Smith	Prince Buster
10.	"Sammy Dead" – Eric "Monty" Morris"	Byron A. Lee / Eric Lloyd Morris	Byron Lee
11.	"My Boy Lollipop" – Millie Small"	Morris Levy / Johnnie B Roberts / Robert Spencer	Chris Blackwell
12.	"Carry Go Bring Come" – Justin Hinds & The Dominoes"	Justin Hinds	Arthur "Duke" Reid
13.	"Occupation" – Don Drummond & The Skatalites"	Don Drummond	Arthur "Duke" Reid
14.	"Little Did You Know" – The Techniques"	Winston Delano Riley	Winston Riley & Arthur "Duke" Reid
15.	"Dancing Mood" (Alternate Mix) – Delroy Wilson"	Ray Whitley	Clement Seymour Dodd
16.	"Rough and Tough" – Strange Cole"	Wilburn T. Cole	Arthur "Duke" Reid
17.	"Take It Easy" – Hopeton Lewis"	Hopeton Lewis Jr	S. Mitchell & K. Scott
18.	"Every Night" – Chuck & Joe White"	Joe White / Chuck White	Sonia Pottinger
19.	"Rock Steady" – Alton Ellis"	Alton N. Ellis / Brian A. B. Atkinson	Arthur "Duke" Reid
20.	"Tougher Than Tough" – Derrick Morgan"	Derrick S. Morgan	Leslie Kong
21.	"No More Heartaches" – The Beltones"	Harry Johnson	Arthur "Duke" Reid
22.	"The Tide is High" – The Paragons"	John K Holt / Tyrone Evans / Howard A. Barrett	Arthur "Duke" Reid
23.	"Trenchtown Rock" – Bob Marley & The Wailers"	Bob Marley	Bob Marley & Lee Perry
24.	"Israelites" – Desmond Dekker & The Aces"	Brian Atkinson / Desmond A. Dacres	Leslie Kong
25.	"Sweet & Dandy" – Toots & The Maytals"	Frederick Hibbert	Leslie Kong
26.	"Everything Crash" – The Ethiopians"	Leonard W. Dillon	Carl "JJ" Johnson
27.	"Satta Massagana" – Abyssinians"	Carlton C. Manning	Lynford Manning
28.	"Fire Corner" – King Stitt"	Clancy Eccles	Clansy Eccles
29.	"Java Dub" – Impact All Stars"	Clive Chin	Clive Chin
30.	"Hypocrite" – The Heptones"	Earl Morgan / Leroy Sibbles / Barry Llewellyn	Joe Gibbs

=== Disc 2 ===
No.	Title	Writer(s)	Producer(s)	Length
1.	"Wear You To The Ball" – U Roy & The Paragons"	Euwart A. Beckford / John K. Holt / Howard A. Barrett / Tyrone Evans	Arthur "Duke" Reid
2.	"Cherry Oh Baby" – Eric Donaldson"	Eric E. Donaldson	Edward "Bunny" Lee
3.	"54-46 That's My Number" – Toots & The Maytals"	Frederick Hibbert	Leslie Kong
4.	"Them A Fi Get A Beatin'" – Peter Tosh"	Peter Tosh	Joe Gibbs
5.	"Many Rivers to Cross" – Jimmy Cliff"	James E. Chamber	Leslie Kong
6.	"The Sun Shines For Me" – Bob Andy"	Keith Anderson	Richard Khouri
7.	"Marcus Garvey" – Burning Spear"	Phillip J. Fullwood / Winston G. Rodney	Lawrence Lindo
8.	"Fade Away" – Junior Byles"	Earl S. Chinna Smith	Joseph "Jo Jo" Hookim
9.	"Lady With That Starlight" – Ken Boothe"	Harris L. Seaton / Pottinger / Seaton	Sonia Pottinger
10.	"Right Time" – The Mighty Diamonds"	Lloyd A. Ferguson / Donald O. Shaw / Fitzroy O. Simpson / Joseph Hoo Kim	Joseph "Jo Jo" Hookim
11.	"Police and Thieves" – Junior Murvin"	Junior Murvin / Lee Perry	Lee "Scratch" Perry
12.	"Ramgoat Liver" – Pluto Shervington"	Pluto Shervington	Paul Khouri
13.	"We De People / The Power And The Glory" – Ernie Smith"	Glenroy A. Smith	Ernie Smith
14.	"Two Sevens Clash" – Culture"	Ralph Walker / Joseph C. Hill / Roy S. Dayes	Joe Gibbs
15.	"It's Alright" – Bob Marley & The Wailers"	Bob Marley	Lee Perry
16.	"Forward Ever" – Jacob Miller"	Ian Lewis / Roger Lewis	Inner Circle INC.
17.	"My Number One" – Gregory Isaacs"	Gregory Isaacs	Alvin "GG" Ranglin
18.	"Money in My Pocket" – Dennis Brown"	Dennis Brown / Joe Gibbs	Joe Gibbs & Errol Thompson
19.	"Kaya" – Bob Marley & The Wailers"	Bob Marley	Lee Perry
20.	"Rub A Dub Style" – Michigan & Smiley"	Errol L. Bennett / Clement S. Dodd / Anthony E. Fairclough	Clement Seymour Dodd
21.	"Uptown Top Ranking" – Althea & Donna"	Donna M. Reid / Althea R. Forrest / Joe Gibbs / Errol F. Thompson	Joe Gibbs & Errol Thompson
22.	"Land of My Birth" – Eric Donaldson"	Winston A. Wallace	Byron Lee & Winston Wallace
23.	"Silly Games" – Janet Kay"	John L Myatt / Diana M Bovell	Dennis Bovell
24.	"Someone Loves You Honey" – J. C. Lodge"	Don Devaney	Joe Gibbs, Errol Thompson & Willie Lindo
25.	"Guess Who's Coming To Dinner" – Black Uhuru"	Michael Rose / Winston Holness	Sly Dunbar & Robbie Shakespeare
26.	"Arleen" – General Echo"	Earl Robinson / Winston D. Riley	Winston Riley

=== Disc 3 ===
No.	Title	Writer(s)	Producer(s)	Length
1.	"Over Me" – Yellowman"	Winston Foster	Lloyd Campbell
2.	"One Two" – Sister Nancy"	Winston Riley	Winston Riley
3.	"Pass The Dutchie" – Musical Youth"	Headley G Bennett / Jackie Mittoo / U Brown / Lloyd A. Ferguson / Robert B. Lyn / Leroy Sibbles	Peter Collins
4.	"I'm Getting Married In The Morning" – Yellowman"	Winston Foster	Henry "Junjo" Lawes
5.	"Try Jah Love" – Third World"	Stevie Wonder / Melody A. McCully	Stevie Wonder
6.	"Push Comes To Shove" – Freddie McGregor"	Freddie McGregor	Freddie McGregor
7.	"Love Has Found Its Way" – Dennis Brown"	Dennis E. Brown / Yvonne Brown	Joe Gibbs, Errol Thompson & Willie Lindo
8.	"Cottage In Negril" – Tyrone Taylor"	Tyrone G. Taylor / Duane A Stephenson	Tyrone Taylor
9.	"Every Time A Ear De Soun'" – Mutabaruka"	Allan R. Hope	Mutabaruka
10.	"Electric Boogie" – Marcia Griffiths"	Neville Livingston	The Jerks
11.	"Under Me Sleng Teng" – Wayne Smith"	Ian F. Smith / Noel E. Davey / Lloyd W. James	Lloyd "Prince Jammy" James
12.	"Greetings" – Half Pint"	Lindon A Roberts	George Phang
13.	"No Way No Better Than Yard" – Admiral Bailey"	Joseph A. Sterling	Lloyd "Prince Jammy" James
14.	"Wild World" – Maxi Priest"	Cat Stevens	Willie Lindo, Sly Dunbar, Robbie Shakespeare
15.	"Cover Me" – Tinga Stewart & Ninjaman"	Marlin R. Greene / Eddie Hinton	Lloyd Dennis
16.	"Wild Gilbert" – Lovindeer"	Lloyd Lovindeer	Lloyd Lovindeer
17.	"Pocomania Day" – Lovindeer & Chalice"	Lloyd Lovindeer	Lloyd Lovindeer
18.	"Good Thing Going" – Sugar Minott"	Berry Gordy / Alphonso J. Mizell / Frederick J. Perren / Deke Richards	D. A. Forbes
19.	"One Blood" – Junior Reid"	Delroy Reid	Junior Reid
20.	"Twice My Age" – Shabba Ranks & Krystal Rexton Gordon / Cherylle Ann E. Ramdeen"	Rexton Gordon / Cherylle Ann E. Ramdeen	Augustus "Gussie" Clarke
21.	"Hello Africa" – Garnet Silk"	Garnett Silk	Richard Bell
22.	"Murder She Wrote" – Chaka Demus & Pliers"	Sly Dunbar / Lloyd O. Willis / Everton Bonner / John C. Taylor	Sly Dunbar, Herbie Harris, Lloyd "Gitsy" Willis, Robbie Shakespeare

=== Disc 4 ===
No.	Title	Writer(s)	Producer(s)	Length
1.	"Putting Up Resistance" – Beres Hammond"	Beresford H. Hammond / David W. Sinclair	Tappa Zukie
2.	"You Don't Love Me (No, No, No)" – Dawn Penn"	Willie C Cobbs / Dawn Penn	Wycliffe "Steely" Johnson & Cleveland "Clevie" Browne
3.	"Murderer" – Buju Banton"	Clement Dodd / Mark A Myrie	Donovan Germain
4.	"Tour" – Capleton"	Clifton G. Bailey / Stuart Brown / Sly Dunbar	Stuart Brown
5.	"Lord Give Me Strength" – Luciano"	Philip Burrell / Jepther W. McClymont	Phillip "Fattis" Burrell
6.	"Untold Stories" – Buju Banton"	Glenroy Browne / Donovan Germain / Mark Myrie / Handel W. A. Tucker	Donovan Germain
7.	"Fed Up" – Bounty Killer"	Rodney B Price / Lowell Dunbar	Sly Dunbar & Robbie Shakespeare
8.	"Sycamore Tree" – Lady Saw"	Dave W. A. Kelly	Dave Kelly
9.	"Black Woman & Child" – Sizzla"	Bobby Dixon / Migel O Collins / Oscar B. O'Hare	Bobby "Digital" Dixon
10.	"Who Am I" – Beenie Man"	Moses A. Davis / Jeremy A Harding	Jeremy Harding
11.	"Down By The River" – Morgan Heritage"	Memmalatel Morgan / Nakhamyah Morgan / Peter A Morgan / Denroy Morgan / Clement Dodd / Keble F. Drummond / Una Iyarn Morgan	Dean "Cannon" Fraser
12.	"Virtuous Woman" – Warrior King"	Clement S Dodd / John Holt / Mark A. Dyer / Unknown Composer Author	Ian Williams & Michael Johnson
13.	"Gimme Di Light" – Sean Paul"	Sean Henriques / Troy Rami	Troyton Rami & Roger Mackenzie
14.	"Pon De River Pon De Bank" – Elephant Man"	Donovan Bennett / Craig Jomo Parks / Oneil Norman H Bryan	Donocan 'Don Corleon' Bennett
15.	"Welcome To Jamrock" – Damian Marley"	Ini Kamoze / Stephen Marley / Damian R. N. Marley	Stephen Marley
16.	"She's Royal" – Tarrus Riley"	Omar R. Riley / Robbie Lyn / Lowell Dunbar / Robert Shakespeare / Mitchum Chin	Dean "Cannon" Fraser
17.	"True Reflections" – Jah Cure"	Gladstone Wright / Duane Stephenson / Sonita Walker	Andrew Prendergast & Joseph Bogdanovich
18.	"Roots" – Etana"	Steven Stanley / Omar R. Riley / Shauna G M McKenzie	Steven Stanley
19.	"Boombastic" – Shaggy"	Orville Burrell / Floyd King / Robert Livingston	Rober Livingston & Shaun "Sting Int'l " Pizzonia
20.	"Lioness On The Rise" – Queen Ifrica"	Patrick Barrett / Ventrice L. Morgan	Donovan Germain
21.	"I'm On The Rock" – Mavado"	Collin D. Edwards / David C Brooks / Trevor W. James	Trevor "Baby G" James
22.	"The Harder They Come" – Jimmy Cliff"	Jimmy Cliff	Jimmy Cliff
