= Aloun Ndombet-Assamba =

Jamaican lawyer, politician and diplomat

The Honourable Aloun Ndombet-Assamba

Jamaican High Commissioner to the United Kingdom
- In office May 2012 – May 2016
- Prime Minister: Portia Simpson-Miller; Andrew Holness
- Preceded by: Anthony Johnson
- Succeeded by: Seth Ramocan

Member of Parliament for Saint Ann South Eastern
- In office 8 September 2004 – 11 September 2007
- Preceded by: Seymour Mullings
- Succeeded by: Lisa Hanna

Personal details
- Born: 27 February 1955 (age 71) Saint Ann's Bay, Saint Ann, Jamaica
- Party: People's National Party
- Education: University of the West Indies

Aloun Ndombet-Assamba (born 27 February 1955) is a Jamaican lawyer, politician and diplomat. She was formerly Member of Parliament for Saint Ann South Eastern and served as Jamaica's Minister of Tourism, Entertainment, and Culture. She has served as High Commissioner for Jamaica in London between 2012 and 2016.

== Early life and education ==
Assamba was born in Spanish Town, St. Catherine her parents pulled up roots and went to live in Moneague, St. Ann along with her when she was a baby. Her parents then moved to Kingston with her when she was 13 years old. She was educated at Ferncourt High School, Merl Grove High School and the Convent of Mercy Alpha Academy, where she was deputy Head Girl. She then went on to study law at the University of the West Indies and the Norman Manley Law School. She then studied Alternative Dispute Resolution at Capital University in Columbus, Ohio.

== Career ==
=== Legal career ===
Assamba was legal advisor at the Jamaica Industrial Development Corporation (JIDC) between 1983 and 1987 and the Heinz Fellow in Strategic Management at the University of Pittsburgh between 1991 and 1992.

She became a lecturer at the Mona School of Business and taught Mediation at the Norman Manley Law School. Between 1994 and 2002, Assamba was the general manager of the City of Kingston Co-operative Credit Union (COK), from 1994 to 2002, and went on to serve as General Counsel & Chief Corporate Officer at Paymaster Jamaica Limited (2007-2008).

=== Political career ===
Aloun Ndombet-Assamba served as a Government Senator between 1998 and 2002 and then as Member of Parliament for Saint Ann South Eastern until 2007, when she was succeeded by Lisa Hanna.

Assamba served as Minister of State in the Ministry of Industry, Commerce, and Technology before becoming one of three women in the Cabinet of Jamaica as Minister of Tourism, Entertainment, and Culture.

She has been involved with many voluntary sector organisations, including the United Way of Jamaica, the Jamaica Cancer Society, the Jamaican Bar Association, and the Lions Club.

=== Diplomatic career ===
Assamba was ambassador to six European countries and was appointed as the Jamaican High Commissioner to the United Kingdom in May 2012 and served until May 2016.

== Awards ==
- Heinz Fellowship, University of Pittsburgh
- Veuve Clicquot La Grande Dame Award

== See also ==
- Women in the House of Representatives of Jamaica
