= Queen's School, Jamaica =

The Queen's School

Location
- 4 - 10 Central Avenue; Kingston 8 Jamaica
- Coordinates: 18.03207°N 76.79702°W

Information
- School type: Public Secondary school
- Motto: Virtute et Sapientia Floreat (May she flourish in virtue and wisdom)
- Religious affiliation: Christianity
- Denomination: Anglican
- Founded: 1953
- Founder: Synod of the Church of England
- Status: Open
- School code: 02061
- Grades: 7 to 13
- Gender: Girls
- Age: 11 to 19
- Language: English
- Campus type: Urban
- Houses: Alexandria; Victoria; Elizabeth; Mary
- Colours: Red, White and Gray
- Song: Go Forth with God, Lord of all Hopefulness
- Nickname: Queen's, Queen's High
- Accreditation: CXC, CSEC, GCE, CAPE
- Alumni: Lisa Hanna; Miss World/Member of Parliament; Grace Jackson; Sportswoman/Olympian; Mitsy Seaga; Miss Jamaica World
- Website: thequeensschool.org.jm

The Queen's School, Jamaica is an all-girl high school located in Kingston, Jamaica. Academically, it is one of the top high schools in Jamaica. It is an Anglican school and is well known and respected for producing quality students. The school is located off Constant Spring Road, on Central Avenue with The Queen's Preparatory School on the same property. The Queen's School ( also referred to as Queen's or Queen's School ) caters to students from the ages of 11 to 19, ranging from 1st to 6th forms.

== History ==
The Queen's School was founded in 1953 when the Synod of the Church of England passed a solution proposed by Cyril Forster Garbett, GCVO (6 February 1875 – 31 December 1955), that a new secondary school should be established. In January 1954, the school was formally opened as a diocesan high school for girls with a preparatory department for boys and girls.

The school started with fifty-one students, four forms and four teachers in the old Doric Hotel building. The High School was under the direction of Mrs. Anne Chambers with Mrs. S. E. Clarke as Second Mistress. In 1955 Mrs. Clarke took over as Headmistress.

1958 was an important year in the history of Queen's and indeed in the history of Jamaica for it marked the coming of the Common Entrance Examination. 1958 also marked the opening of the tennis courts. 1959 saw the establishment of the Junior School for children between the ages of 9 and 11, as well as the building which housed the high school's laboratories for chemistry and biology and the cookery, art and needlework rooms.

In 1960 the school had 360 students. The number of students rose from 600 in 1973 to nearly 1000 in 1978 by which time the school had a swimming pool, netball courts, and a new Administrative Block in place of the old Doric Hotel Building. The school also competed and won the ISSA Girl's Championships for the first time in that year (1978).

The school crest has a Tudor Rose which is the traditional floral heraldic emblem of England and takes its name and origins from the Tudor dynasty.

== Houses and Badges ==
The houses are named after Queens of England and the school badge worn by students is embroidered with their respective house colour and are as follows:

- Victoria - Red Badge
- Mary - Blue Badge
- Alexandra - Green Badge
- Elizabeth - Yellow Badge

== Insignia ==
Motto

- Virtute et Sapientia Floreat - "May she flourish in virtue and wisdom"

Emblem

- Tudor Rose

Uniform

- Lower School (1st - 5th Forms (Grades 7–11)) Grey "V" neck tunic- with crest, white rolled - up three quarter sleeve blouse, red tie. Black shoes, white socks.
- Upper School (6th Form (Grades 12–13)) Grey A-line skirt with white blanket stitch lining pockets, white rolled - up three quarter sleeve blouse, red tie and the school badge along with a house badge to be pinned upon the left corner of shirt. Black shoes, white socks.

Colours

- Red, White and Grey

== School hymns ==
There are two school hymns:

- Go Forth With God
- Lord of All Hopefulness

== Notable alumni ==
Arts & Culture

- Laura Facey (Cooper) - Sculptress ( Redemption Song, Emancipation Park)
- Ebony Patterson - Visual Artist
- Patricia Cumper - British Playwright, Producer, Director

Sports

- Althea Byfield - Sportswoman (Netball, Basketball)
- Grace Jackson - Sportswoman/Olympian (Track & Field) (Nominee for Sportswoman of the Year)
- Carla Borrego née: Williams - Sportswoman (Netball)

Politics, Law & Business

- Lisa Hanna - Member of Parliament and former Miss World
- Helene Davis-Whyte - Trade Unionist
- Hon. Carol R. Sharpe - Justice of the New York Supreme Court, 1st Judicial District

Music

- Sharon Forrester - Singer
- Althea & Donna - Singers
- Cherine Anderson- Singer/Songwriter, Actress, President of The Reach One Child R.O.C. Foundation

Education

- Kamala-Jean Gopie - Educator (Canada)
