= Saint Andrew East Central (Jamaica Parliament constituency) =

Parliamentary constituency of Jamaica

Saint Andrew East Central is a parliamentary constituency represented in the House of Representatives of the Jamaican Parliament. It elects one Member of Parliament MP by the first past the post system of election. The current MP is Dennis Gordon.

== MPs ==
- Peter Phillips (until 2025)
- Dennis Gordon (since 2025)

== Boundaries ==
Constituency includes Cassia Park.

General Election 2007: Saint Andrew East Central
| Party | Candidate | Votes | % | ±% |
|---|---|---|---|---|
| PNP | Peter Phillips | 6,385 | 61.92 | |
| JLP | Claude Riddell | 3,926 | 38.08 | |
| Total votes | | 10,311 | 100.0 | |
| Turnout | | | 51.62 | |
| PNP hold | | | | |
