= Dennis Gordon (politician) =

Jamaican politician

MP for Saint Andrew East Central
- Incumbent
- Assumed office 3 September 2025
- Preceded by: Peter Phillips

Personal details
- Party: People's National Party

Dennis Gordon is a Jamaican politician from the People's National Party who has been MP for Saint Andrew East Central since 2025.

Gordon was previously chairman of Jacden Pharma & Medical Services.
