= Leader of the Opposition (Jamaica) =

Parliamentary position of Jamaica

Leader of His Majesty's Most Loyal Opposition of the Lower house of the Houses of Parliament of Jamaica
- Incumbent; Mark Golding since 11 November 2020
- Style: The Honourable
- Nominator: Delegates from the largest party not in Opposition
- Term length: While leader of the largest political party in the House of Representatives that is not in government
- Inaugural holder: Norman Manley
- Formation: August 6, 1962

In Jamaica, the Leader of the Opposition (officially the Leader of His Majesty's Most Loyal Opposition) is the leader of the largest political party in the House of Representatives that is not in government. The Leader of the Opposition is seen as the alternative Prime Minister and leads the Shadow Cabinet of Jamaica.

Mark Golding was appointed Leader of Opposition on November 11, 2020 following his election as President of the People's National Party.

== Leaders of the Opposition of Jamaica ==
No.	Portrait	Name (Birth–Death)	Tenure		Political party
1		Norman Manley (1893–1969)	1962	1969	People's National Party
2		Michael Manley (1924–1997)	1969	2 March 1972	People's National Party
3		Hugh Shearer (1923–2004)	2 March 1972	1974	Jamaica Labour Party
4		Edward Seaga (1930–2019)	1974	1 November 1980	Jamaica Labour Party
(2)		Michael Manley (1924–1997)	1 November 1980	10 February 1989	People's National Party
(4)		Edward Seaga (1930–2019)	10 February 1989	21 January 2005	Jamaica Labour Party
5		Kenneth Baugh (1941–2019)	21 January 2005	24 January 2005	Jamaica Labour Party
6		Bruce Golding (born 1947)	24 January 2005	11 September 2007	Jamaica Labour Party
7		Portia Simpson-Miller (born 1945)	11 September 2007	5 January 2012	People's National Party
8		Andrew Holness (born 1972)	5 January 2012	3 March 2016	Jamaica Labour Party
(7)		Portia Simpson-Miller (born 1945)	3 March 2016	2 April 2017	People's National Party
9		Peter Phillips (born 1949)	3 April 2017	11 November 2020	People's National Party
10		Mark Golding (born 1965)	11 November 2020	Incumbent	People's National Party

== See also ==
- Politics of Jamaica
- Governor-General of Jamaica
- Prime Minister of Jamaica
- Shadow Cabinet of Jamaica
