= Patricia Cumper =

British theatre director (born 1954)

Pat Cumper MBE, FRSA, FRSL
- Born: Patricia Cumper; 1954 (age 71–72); Jamaica
- Education: Girton College, Cambridge University
- Occupations: Playwright, producer, director, theatre administrator, critic and commentator
- Writing career
- Language: English
- Notable work: Chigger Foot Boys

Patricia Cumper, MBE, FRSA, FRSL (born 1954), also known as Pat Cumper, is a British playwright, producer, director, theatre administrator, critic and commentator. She was the artistic director and CEO of Talawa Theatre Company from 2006 to 2012, and she has adapted novels for radio and television, including books by Toni Morrison, Alice Walker, Andrea Levy, Zora Neale Hurston and Maya Angelou and others.

== Life ==
Cumper was born and grew up in Jamaica, with her English father and Jamaican mother. She followed her parents to study at Cambridge University, for which she won a scholarship from The Queen's School in Kingston, to study Archaeology and Anthropology at Girton College (1973–1976). While there, Cumper was a College Exhibitioner and was also awarded a full swimming Blue, captaining the swim team.

After graduating, Cumper returned to Jamaica, where she began a career writing for the radio, including two major soap operas, Malvina's Revenge and Mortimer Simmonds. Returning to Britain in 1993 she continued her career as a playwright, writing for BBC Radio 4.

In the 2013 New Year Honours she was appointed a Member of the Most Excellent Order of the British Empire (MBE) for services to the arts.

She has sons and grandsons.

== Career ==
Cumper has written a large number of plays both for the stage and radio, episodes of Westway, short stories, and a novel, One Bright Child, published in 1998.

Cumper began writing after watching a play of which she was critical, and being challenged to do better. She wrote a play called The Rapist, which ran for six months and won an award. She continued to write and also produced plays, winning four awards for her work, which was produced in the Caribbean, the US and Canada. She moved to Britain in 1993 to pursue her career.

Cumper worked for the UK's largest Black-led theatre company, Talawa, from about 1999, as a writer, script reader, tutor, assistant director and dramaturge. She went on to become artistic director of Talawa Theatre Company in 2006 and stepped down in 2012, after overseeing their 25th anniversary season.

Cumper became a trustee of the British Museum in 2013.

In January 2015, her adaptation of Toni Morrison's 1987 novel Beloved was broadcast in 10 episodes by BBC Radio 4 as part of its 15 Minute Drama programme.

Cumper's 2017 play Chigger Foot Boys, which pays tribute to African and Caribbean soldiers who lost their lives in the First World War, was produced at Tara Arts to a positive reception. Paul Vale in a four-star review for The Stage called it a "Richly textured play delivered with clarity and touchingly performed", commenting that "the perspective is wholly enlightening", and Sonia Grant wrote in the Huffington Post: "In the dexterous hands of acclaimed playwright Patricia Cumper MBE, Chigger Foot Boys accomplished what a good theatrical production should by being bold, entertaining and enlightening. Indeed, Cumper's year and a half's research in both Britain and Jamaica shows; the play is jam-packed with little-known information on Jamaica's involvement in World War I."

In 2018, Cumper, Winsome Pinnock and Janice Okoh between them dramatised six of Maya Angelou's autobiographical books for BBC Radio 4. The drama series was entitled The Amazing Maya Angelou, and Pippa Bennett-Warner and Adjoa Andoh respectively played the author as a young adult and in later life.

She is a contributor to the 2019 anthology New Daughters of Africa, edited by Margaret Busby.

Cumper's play The Key Game, produced in October 2002 by Talawa at London's Riverside Studios to much acclaim, was premiered in the US at the New Perspectives Studio in Manhattan from 17 October to 28 October 2018.

Patricia Cumper (also known as Pat Cumper) is the producer of the BBC Radio 4 epic drama series Faith, Hope and Glory. She produced the series for BBC Studios, which charts the history of post-war Britain through the lives of three African-Caribbean families connected by the theft of a pram in 1946. Source BBC

== Awards ==
Cumper has won awards for her radio drama, encompassing original works as well as adaptations of the work of other writers, including Andrea Levy, Alice Walker, Zora Neale Hurston and Toni Morrison. She was runner-up in the inaugural BBC Screenplay First Award.

She is a Fellow of the Royal Society of the Arts and in 2013 was awarded an MBE for services to Black British Theatre.

In 2023, she was elected a Fellow of the Royal Society of Literature.

== Selected bibliography ==
- One Bright Child, London: BlackAmber, 1998.
- Inner Yardie: Three Plays, Peepal Tree Press, 2017.
