= Audley Shaw =

Jamaican politician (born 1952)

The Honourable Audley Shaw OJ CD MP
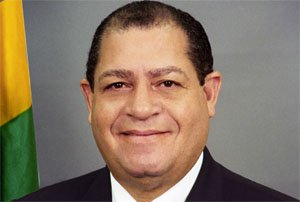

Minister of Finance, Planning and the Public Service
- In office 7 March 2016 – 26 March 2018
- Prime Minister: Andrew Holness
- Preceded by: Dr. Peter Phillips
- Succeeded by: Nigel A. L. Clarke
- In office 11 September 2007 – 5 January 2012
- Prime Minister: Andrew Holness
- Preceded by: Dr. Omar Davies
- Succeeded by: Dr. Peter Phillips

Shadow Minister of Finance, Planning and the Public Service
- In office 19 September 2012 – 7 March 2016
- Leader: Andrew Holness
- Preceded by: Omar Davies
- Succeeded by: Peter Phillips

MP for Manchester North Eastern
- In office 1993–2025
- Succeeded by: Audrey Marks

Personal details
- Born: 13 June 1952 (age 74) Christiana, Manchester, Colony of Jamaica, British Empire
- Education: Northern Illinois University (BA, MA)

Audley Shaw CD MP (born 13 June 1952) is a Jamaican politician. He currently serves as Minister of Transport & Mining since January 2022. Prior to this appointment he served as the Minister of Industry, Investment and Commerce from September 2020 - January 2022. He was Minister of Industry, Commerce, Agriculture and Fisheries in Jamaica between 26 March 2018 and 13 September 2020. He also previously served as Minister of Finance and the Public Service in Jamaica from 7 March 2016 to 26 March 2018 and also served in the post from 2007 to 2012.

Between 1983 and 1986, he became the Director of Public Relations and Advertising at the Jamaica National Investment Promotions Limited (JNIP). His responsibilities included overseeing operations in the various JNIP's Marketing and Overseas Offices in the United States, Canada, Japan, Hong Kong and the United Kingdom and saw many new investments come to Jamaica. He resigned his position with Government and became a Merchant and Marketing Consultant, in 1986.

In 1989, Edward Seaga appointed Mr. Shaw to the Senate. He has served as Shadow Minister of Information and Culture, Shadow Minister of Public Utilities and Transport and Shadow Minister of Industry and Commerce and has been the Member of Parliament for North East Manchester since 1993.

Mr. Shaw has served as General Secretary of the Jamaica Labour Party and has been a Deputy Leader in the Party, since 1999, and was appointed Chairman of the Public Accounts Committee (PAC) of Parliament in 1995.

In September 2007, Mr. Shaw was appointed as Minister of Finance and the Public Service for the Jamaica Labour Party.

In November 2013, he ran against Andrew Holness unsuccessfully for the post of leader of the Jamaica Labour Party;

In October, 2013 during the Heroes' Day Awards Ceremony at King's House in Kingston, Mr. Shaw was awarded the Order of Distinction in the rank of Commander for his 20 years of dedicated and honorary service to the House of Parliament.

In the Jamaica General Election held on 3 September 2020 Mr. Shaw won by a margin of 3900 votes in his constituency, North East Manchester. This victory ushers in his 7th term as Minister of Parliament and his largest margin of victory to date. He shares this victory with the Jamaica Labour Party who celebrate their second term forming the government, having previously won in 2016.
