= Saint Andrew Southern =

Parliamentary constituency of Jamaica

Saint Andrew South is a parliamentary constituency represented in the House of Representatives of the Jamaican Parliament. It elects one Member of Parliament MP by the first past the post system of election. It has been represented by Leader of the Opposition Mark Golding since 2017.

== Boundaries ==
Constituency includes part of Trench Town and Admiral Town.

General Election 2011: Saint Andrew South
Party	Candidate	Votes	%	±%
PNP	Omar Davies			
JLP	Dennis Messias			
Total votes				
Turnout				
hold				

General Election 2007: Saint Andrew South
Party	Candidate	Votes	%	±%
PNP	Omar Davies	8,378	90.8	
JLP	Dennis Messias	849	9.2	
Total votes		9,227	100.0	
Turnout			56.38	
PNP hold				
