= John Golding (surgeon) =

British surgeon

Sir John Golding OJ OBE FRCS
- Born: 15 April 1921; London, England
- Died: 23 March 1996 (aged 74); Jamaica
- Education: Caius College, Cambridge
- Occupation: Surgeon
- Spouse: Patricia Levy (m. 1961)
- Relatives: Mark Golding (son)

Sir John Simon Rawson Golding OJ OBE FRCS (15 April 1921 – 23 March 1996) was a British orthopaedic surgeon known for his work in Jamaica. He moved to the country in 1953 and was a long-serving professor at the University of West Indies in Mona. He specialised in rehabilitation medicine and was a pioneer of the field in Jamaica.

== Early life ==
Golding was born in London on 15 April 1921. His parents were Lithuanian Jews who arrived in the United Kingdom in the 1890s. He was educated at Marlborough College before going on to Caius College, Cambridge. He graduated MBBS in 1944.

== Medical career ==
Golding completed his medical residency at Middlesex Hospital and subsequently undertook his national service in the Royal Army Medical Corps. In 1946 he was posted to Tobruk under the British Military Administration of Libya. After returning to England he trained in orthopaedics at Middlesex Hospital and the Royal National Orthopaedic Hospital.

=== Jamaica ===
In 1953, Golding accepted the position of senior lecturer in orthopaedic surgery at the University College Hospital of the West Indies in Mona, Jamaica. He was promoted to chair of orthopaedic surgery in 1965 and lectured in a number of North American countries, making 16 visits to Haiti. He was regarded as an expert in tropical orthopaedic medicine. Golding was a founding member of World Orthopaedic Concern, an organisation devoted to furthering orthopaedic education in developing countries, and was elected as the organisation's inaugural secretary-general at its first meeting in Nigeria in 1977. In 1994 he was elected chairman of the Commonwealth Caribbean Medical Research Council.

Following a poliomyelitis epidemic which affected around 1,500 people, Golding established the Mona Rehabilitation Centre as a rehabilitation facility for the English-speaking Caribbean. The organisation was later renamed the Sir John Golding Rehabilitation Centre (SJGRC) in his honour. He also established the Hope Valley Experimental School to provide education and training for disabled individuals and Monex, a disability enterprise employing handicapped people. He helped organise the 1966 Commonwealth Paraplegic Games in Jamaica. Golding was also an advocate for road safety in Jamaica, advocating for seatbelt and crash helmet regulations and helping establish the National Road Safety Council of Jamaica.

== Personal life ==
In 1961, Golding married Patricia Levy, the daughter of a Jamaican doctor. The couple had two children, including Mark Golding, who entered politics and became a leader in the People's National Party.

Elected as a Fellow of the Royal College of Surgeons in 1949, Golding was appointed Officer of the Order of the British Empire (OBE) in 1959 and received the Order of Jamaica in 1974. He was knighted in 1986 on the recommendation of the Jamaican government.
