= Anthony Johnson (diplomat) =

Jamaican diplomat (1938–2021)

The Honourable Anthony Johnson OJ CD

Jamaican High Commissioner to the United Kingdom
- In office May 2010 – May 2012
- Preceded by: Burchell Whiteman
- Succeeded by: Aloun Ndombet-Assamba

Jamaican Ambassador to the United States
- In office February 2008 – May 2010
- Succeeded by: Audrey Marks

Personal details
- Born: June 14, 1938
- Died: April 28, 2021 (aged 82)
- Children: 4, including Kamina Johnson Smith
- Education: University of the West Indies; University of California; Kingston College

Anthony Johnson (14 June 1938 – 28 April 2021) was a Jamaican politician, diplomat, economist and university lecturer. He was a Jamaica Labour Party (JLP) senator and JLP Member of Parliament, ambassador to the United States, and High Commissioner to the United Kingdom.

== Biography ==
Johnson graduated from Kingston College, and went on to earn a BA in Economics and an MA in International Trade and Finance from the University of California at Los Angeles. He was an Inter-American Press Association Scholarship winner in 1960 (due to his work with the Gleaner Company and the Jamaica Broadcasting Corporation), was honoured three times for academic excellence at UCLA, and was a Senior Fulbright Scholar in 1980.

Johnson began his career in the public sector. He worked as an economist for the Ministry of Finance and as a planner for the Central Planning Unit of Jamaica. From 1970 to 1980, Johnson dabbled in the private sector, running the operations of Jamaica Frozen Foods, Jamgro Ltd. and the Private Sector Organisation of Jamaica. In 1980, Johnson joined the Jamaica Labour Party and was appointed to the Senate. He left the Senate in 1983 to become a Member of Parliament representing Northeast St. Catherine Parish, a post that he held for ten years. During his time in parliament, Johnson's portfolio included—though not all at once—industry, commerce, mining, energy, technology, education, and agriculture. He joined the Senate once again in 1993, this time for a period of fourteen years. From 1992 to 2008, throughout his time as Senator and MP, Johnson lectured at the University of the West Indies with the Department of Management Studies. Johnson is also noted for being the first Jamaican council member of Parliamentarians for Global Action, a post that he held from 2001 to 2003.

After leaving public office, Johnson worked in the Jamaican Foreign Service. He arrived in Washington, D.C., in February 2008 to serve as Jamaican ambassador to the United States and permanent representative to the Organisation of American States. He held this post until May 2010, when he was sent to London to represent Jamaica as High Commissioner to the United Kingdom of Great Britain and Northern Ireland, and as non-resident ambassador to the Republic of Finland, the Kingdoms of Sweden, Norway, and Denmark, and Ireland.

In April 2009, Johnson, along with Jamaican Prime Minister, Bruce Golding, and Foreign Minister, Kenneth Baugh, attended the Fifth Summit of the Americas in Trinidad and Tobago to meet with U.S. President Barack Obama and other leaders and important diplomats in the Americas. Johnson died on 28 April 2021.

== Humanitarian work ==
Johnson did much to improve the disaster management resources in Jamaica. He appealed to Jamaicans in the United States to support Jamaica's National Disaster Recovery Fund, following the major damage caused during the passage of Hurricane Gustav. The fund was established by the Jamaican government to meet the costs of emergency services and relief measures, particularly with schools and hospitals. Johnson spoke at the RFK Stadium in Washington, D.C., on 7 September 2008 at a Reggae Fest, saying, "I am appealing to you all, to assist Jamaica in its recovery process, by contributing, financially, to the National Disaster Recovery Fund (NDRF). I am sure that many of you here have relatives back in Jamaica, who were affected by the tropical storm, and who are in need of your help at this time."

== Personal life ==
Johnson was married with four children; his daughter Kamina Johnson-Smith is a member of the Senate and a diplomat. His extra-political interests included cricket, athletics, and classical music. He was the author of eleven books and multiple academic articles.
