= Prince Consort Road =

Street in South Kensington, London

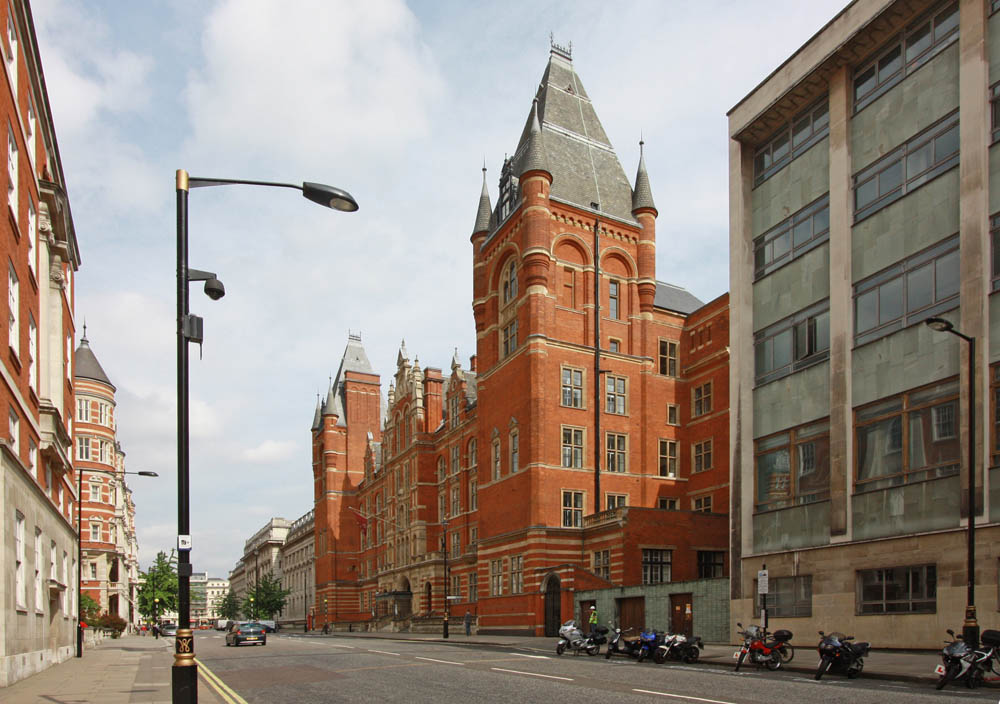
- Royal College of Music from Prince Consort Road.

- Location within Greater London
- Namesake: Albert, Prince Consort
- Type: Street
- Coordinates: 51.4999°N 0.1772°W
- West end: Queen's Gate
- East end: Exhibition Road

Prince Consort Road is a street in London, United Kingdom. It is named after Prince Albert, consort to Queen Victoria. It is located between Queen's Gate to the west and Exhibition Road to the east, running parallel to Kensington Gore.

Several landmark buildings have entrances on Prince Consort Road, including:

- Royal Albert Hall, which has steps leading down from its south side to Prince Consort Road;
- Royal School of Mines (now part of Imperial College London);
- Holy Trinity Church;
- Royal College of Music;
- Jamaican High Commission.

The average residential property price on the street in 2013 was around £5.5 million, making Prince Consort Road the fourth-most expensive street in the UK.

London Buses route 360 starts and ends on Prince Consort Road. The nearest London Underground stations are South Kensington, Gloucester Road, Knightsbridge and High Street Kensington.

== See also ==
- List of eponymous roads in London
