= Edward Seaga =

Prime Minister of Jamaica from 1980 to 1989

The Most Honourable Edward Seaga ON PC
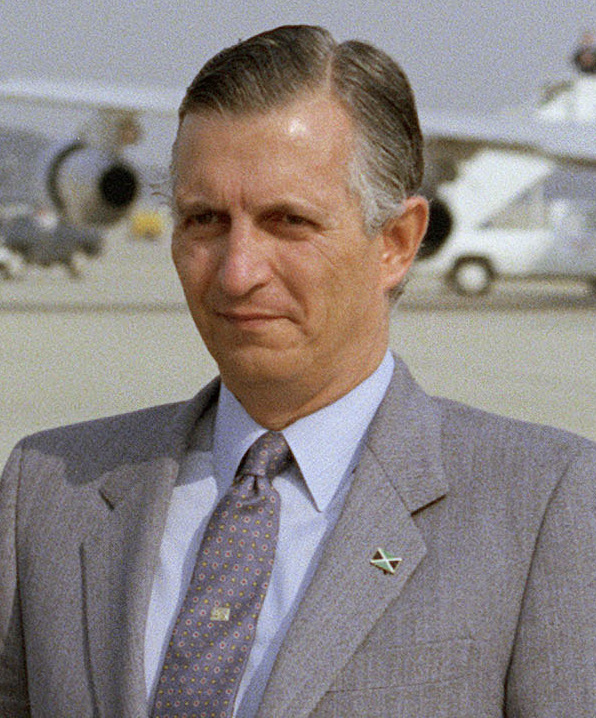
- Seaga in 1983

5th Prime Minister of Jamaica
- In office 1 November 1980 – 10 February 1989
- Monarch: Elizabeth II
- Governor-General: Sir Florizel Glasspole
- Deputy: Hugh Shearer
- Preceded by: Michael Manley
- Succeeded by: Michael Manley

Leader of the Opposition
- In office 10 February 1989 – 21 January 2005
- Monarch: Elizabeth II
- Prime Minister: Michael Manley; P. J. Patterson
- Preceded by: Michael Manley
- Succeeded by: Bruce Golding
- In office 23 November 1974 – 1 November 1980
- Monarch: Elizabeth II
- Prime Minister: Michael Manley
- Preceded by: Hugh Shearer
- Succeeded by: Michael Manley

Leader of the Jamaica Labour Party
- In office 23 November 1974 – 21 January 2005
- Preceded by: Hugh Shearer
- Succeeded by: Bruce Golding

Member of Parliament for Kingston Western
- In office 10 April 1962 – 21 January 2005
- Preceded by: Hugh Shearer
- Succeeded by: Bruce Golding

Member of the Legislative Council
- In office 1959–1962

Personal details
- Born: Edward Philip George Seaga; 28 May 1930 Boston, Massachusetts, U.S.
- Died: 28 May 2019 (aged 89) Miami, Florida, U.S.
- Citizenship: Jamaica; United States (renounced)
- Party: Jamaica Labour Party
- Spouses: Marie 'Mitsy' Constantine (m. 1965; div. 1995) Carla Vendryes (m. 1996)
- Children: 4
- Education: Harvard University (AB)
- Occupation: Politician, record producer

Edward Philip George Seaga ON PC (/ˈsiːɑːɡə/ SEE-ah-gə; 28 May 1930 – 28 May 2019) was a Jamaican politician and record producer. He was the fifth Prime Minister of Jamaica, from 1980 to 1989, and the leader of the Jamaica Labour Party from 1974 to 2005. He served as Leader of the Opposition from 1974 to 1980, and again from 1989 until January 2005.

His retirement from political life marked the end of Jamaica's founding generation in active politics. He was the last serving politician to have entered public life before independence in 1962, as he was appointed to the Legislative Council (now the Senate) in 1959. Seaga is credited with having built the financial and planning infrastructure of the country after independence, as well as having developed its arts and crafts, and awareness of national heritage.

As a record producer and record company owner of West Indies Records Limited, Seaga also played a major role in the development of the Jamaican music industry. Seaga died on 28 May 2019, on his eighty-ninth birthday.

== Early life ==
Edward Philip George Seaga was born on 28 May 1930, in Boston, Massachusetts, to Philip George Seaga, who was of Lebanese Jamaican descent, and Erna (née Maxwell), who was Jamaican of African and Scottish descent. Erna was the daughter of Elizabeth Campbell (maiden name), daughter of John Zungaroo Campbell. Phillip Seaga had moved to the US seeking to take advantage of the prosperity of the Roaring Twenties, but the Wall Street crash of 1929 scotched those dreams. Three months after Edward's birth in Boston, the Seagas returned to Jamaica. He was baptised in Kingston's Anglican Parish Church on 5 December 1930.

Seaga was educated at Wolmer's Boys', one of the Wolmer's Schools in Jamaica. He went to the United States for higher education, graduating from Harvard University in 1952 with a Bachelor of Arts degree in social sciences. Before embarking on his political career, Seaga was a music producer and promoter. He subsequently took a research post at the University of the West Indies.

== Music industry career ==
Seaga's research led to an interest in popular Jamaican music. In 1955, he supervised the recording of an album of ethnic Jamaican music. He continued to produce recordings by other artists and in the late 1950s set up West Indies Records Limited, releasing early recordings by artists such as Higgs and Wilson and Byron Lee & the Dragonaires. Beginning in 1961, Seaga lived in West Kingston. He became deeply involved in its music scene and recorded some of its artists.

West Indies Records Limited became the most successful record company in the West Indies. After being elected in 1962 as a Member of Parliament, representing the Jamaica Labour Party (JLP), he sold the company to Byron Lee. It was renamed Dynamic Sounds.

Over 16 years, Seaga worked on compiling a collection of Jamaican music covering the period from the mid-1950s to the early 1970s. This anthology, Reggae Golden Jubilee Origins of Jamaican Music, was released on 6 November 2012 in celebration of the fiftieth anniversary of Jamaican independence.

In February 1981, while serving as Jamaican Prime Minister, Seaga awarded Bob Marley with a designated Order of Merit, Jamaica's highest honor related to people involved with either the arts, literature or science.

== Early political career ==
Seaga's political career began in 1959 when Alexander Bustamante, founder of the JLP, nominated him to serve in the Upper House of the Jamaican Parliament, the Legislative Council (later the Senate). His appointment at the age of 29 made him the youngest member ever appointed to the Legislative Council. While he was in the Senate, Seaga made his well-reported speech about the "haves" and the "have nots".

As one of the founding fathers in the framing of the Jamaican Constitution in 1961, Seaga spearheaded far-reaching constitutional reforms. He initiated a re-write of the human rights section of the Constitution, to provide for a Charter of Fundamental Rights and Freedoms; creation of the post of Public Defender; and curtailment of some of the powers of the Prime Minister to provide a better balance of power between the executive and the parliament in the Jamaican system of governance.

In April 1962, Seaga was elected Member of Parliament for West Kingston, the waterfront area in the capital city. Historically, it has been the oldest settlement in Kingston for poor, working-class residents, many of whom are unemployed. Employment is largely petty trading with some semi-skilled craftsmen. He held that seat for 43 consecutive years, until he retired, making him the longest-serving Member of Parliament in the history of Jamaica and the Caribbean region. He is the only person to have been elected as Member of Parliament for West Kingston for more than one term, and won 10 consecutive terms.

Immediately after winning his seat in 1962, Seaga was appointed to the Cabinet as Minister of Development and Welfare, with responsibility for all areas of planning, social development and culture. He initiated the redevelopment of Back O'Wall, a notorious large slum in West Kingston, and its replacement by housing, schools and community amenities, which was named Tivoli Gardens.

Seaga also used his position to continue to promote Jamaican music.

Following the 1967 general election, Seaga was appointed Minister of Finance and Planning. In 1964, he advocated for the transfer of the remains of political activist Marcus Garvey from London, England to Jamaica. However, four years later, Seaga was a part of the Cabinet of prime minister Hugh Shearer that banned Walter Rodney from Jamaica for allegedly inciting racial hatred.

In the 1972 general election, the People's National Party (PNP) led by Michael Manley won 37 seats to the JLP's 16, and Shearer and Seaga were swept out of power. In 1974, he became Leader of the JLP, a post he held for 30 years; he was also Leader of the Parliamentary Opposition in various periods. In the 1976 general election, the PNP won another landslide, winning 47 seats to the JLP's 13. The turnout was a very high 85 percent.

There was considerable political violence in the 1970s. This allegedly started in 1975, after Henry Kissinger failed in his attempts to get Manley to stop his support for Cuba and Angola, and their fight against the armies of apartheid South Africa. According to former Central Intelligence Agency (CIA) case officer Philip Agee, the CIA supplied arms to supporters of the JLP, and there was a significant upturn in political violence; Seaga repeatedly denied the accusation. The 1980 general election was marked by widespread violence including running gun battles, and would be won by the JLP in a landslide.

== Prime minister ==
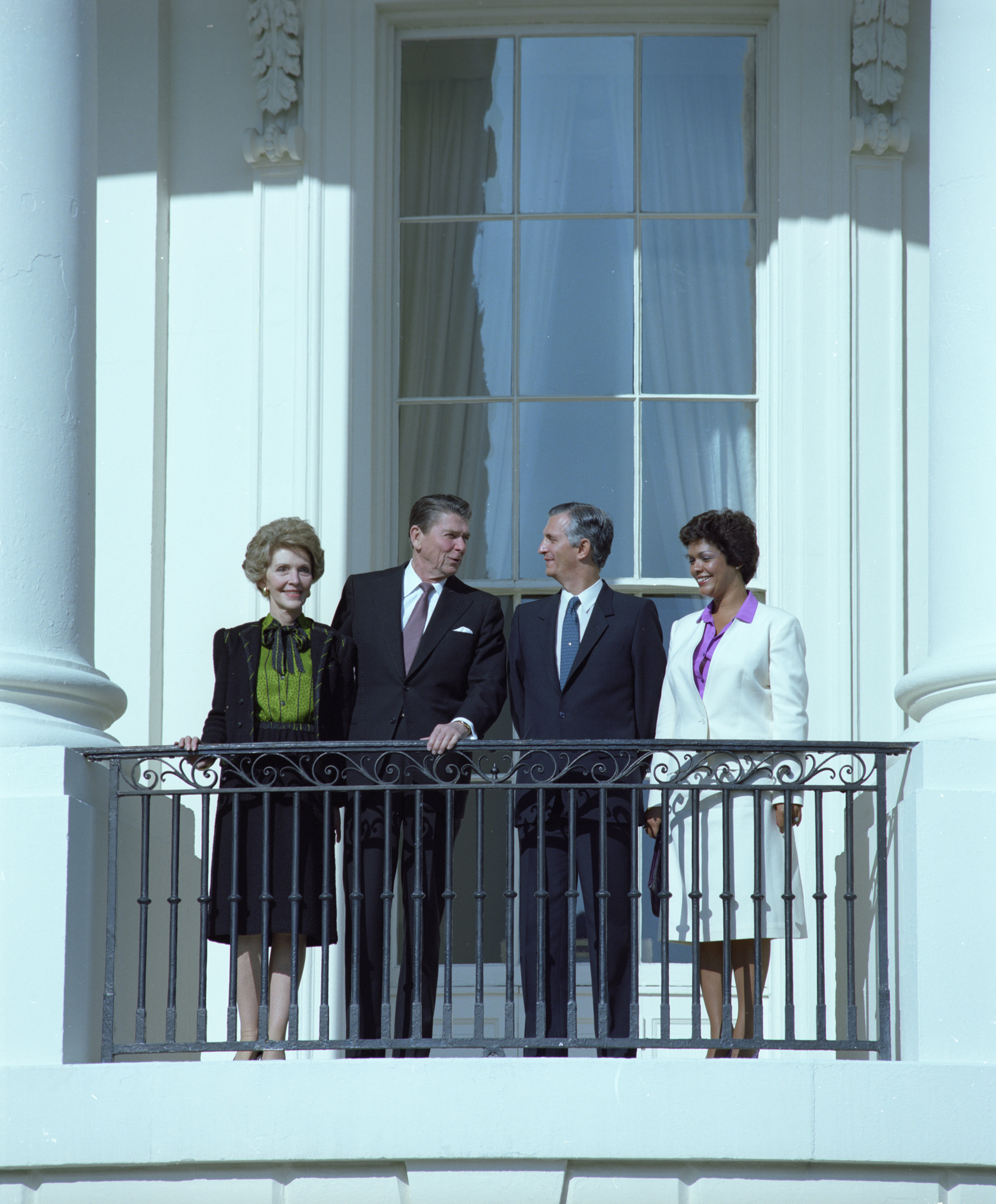
Seaga and his wife Mitzy with U.S. President Ronald Reagan and First Lady Nancy Reagan (1981)

Seaga became Prime Minister of Jamaica following the 30 October 1980 general election, when the JLP won a landslide victory over the incumbent PNP, with the largest mandate until 1993, when the PNP surpassed that total. Out of 60 seats contested in 1980, the JLP won 51 to the PNP's nine.

Seaga and the JLP won the 1983 general election. The JLP ran unopposed, as the PNP boycotted the elections in protest of the JLP's refusal to update the voter register system amid allegations of voter fraud. He continued as prime minister until February 1989.

Widely regarded as one of the most influential Jamaican prime ministers, Seaga was a controversial figure. His supporters claim that he 'saved' Jamaica from communism, while others assert that he 'mashed up' Jamaica. Columnist and attorney-at-law Daniel Thwaites said that while these diametrically opposed sentiments run to the extremes, both are surprisingly prevalent. "It is a barometer of the lasting contentiousness and potential divisiveness of any appraisal of Papa Eddie", Thwaites said, arguing that the only other figure in Jamaican political history who could possibly be as controversial as Seaga would be his nemesis, Michael Manley. Thwaites said, "because of their titanic decades-long confrontation, they will be forever – and, perhaps ironically – inextricably linked".

=== Economic policies and IMF agreements ===
During his tenure as premiership, Seaga implemented free-market economic policies, including agreements with the International Monetary Fund (IMF). His administration embraced neoliberal reforms, reducing government intervention in the economy and privatizing state-owned enterprises. While these policies stabilized Jamaica's economy, they also led to austerity measures, high unemployment, and social unrest. Critics argue that Seaga's economic approach disproportionately affected the working class, deepening inequalities.

=== Foreign policy ===
A staunch anti-communist, Seaga reversed the diplomatic engagement that Manley had pursued with Cuba and Grenada, two countries that had adopted strong anti-American stances following the Cuban Revolution in 1959 and the 1979 Grenada Revolution, respectively. Seaga formed a close relationship with United States President Ronald Reagan and British Prime Minister Margaret Thatcher. Seaga cut ties with Cuba shortly after winning the 1980 election, and sent a small contingent of forces to support the U.S. invasion of Grenada in October–November 1983. By 1983, Jamaica had become the third largest recipient of U.S. aid per capita after Egypt and Israel.

In the 1980s, the Seaga administration became embroiled in accusations of a dark circle of narco-banking involving the Contras of Nicaragua, the CIA and the Israeli money-launderer Eli Tisona. Seaga's Agro 21 programme was accused of involvement in cocaine trafficking from Colombia, and its Spring Plains project employed Shower Posse's Lester Lloyd Coke, also known as Jim Brown, as head of security. However, these allegations went unproven, with all investigations coming up blank.

== 1990 Internal Surveillance Controversy and the "Gang of Five" Rebellion ==
Following the Jamaica Labour Party's (JLP) defeat in the 1989 general election and subsequent losses in the March 1990 local government elections, Seaga’s leadership came under intense pressure from internal factions advocating for structural party democratization. This political friction culminated in April 1990 when a major political crisis, known colloquially as the "JLP Spy Scandal," fractured the party's leadership structure.

The controversy erupted during a special meeting of the JLP Central Executive on April 8, 1990. Attorney and former JLP Senator Abe Dabdoub presented a letter detailing an illegal, private espionage operation within the party. Dabdoub alleged that elements of the party leadership at the highest level had engaged an operative—later identified as recovering addict and active JLP supporter John "Jackie" Bell—to intercept telecommunications and surreptitiously tape-record private conversations of high-ranking party figures who had grown critical of Seaga's autocratic leadership style. The initial targets identified included Dabdoub, former Minister of Tourism Anthony Abrahams, and JLP Deputy Leader Pearnel Charles. The presentation of the letter prompted the immediate, emotional walkout of JLP Chairman Bruce Golding.

Though Seaga secured a unanimous vote of leadership endorsement from the 227 Central Executive members present at that meeting, the surveillance allegations severely destabilized the party. On April 17, 1990, Dabdoub held a press conference at the Jamaica Pegasus Hotel, playing recorded tapes of the espionage operations to journalists and publicly demanding that the JLP Central Executive discipline Seaga alongside former senators Olivia "Babsy" Grange and George Ramocan for their involvement. The following day, Grange released an official statement admitting she had provided the recording equipment to Bell, though she defended her actions as a defensive counter-intelligence measure to investigate rumors of an internal conspiracy and the leakage of sensitive party information to the rival People's National Party (PNP). Concurrently, media commentary highlighted public assertions made by columnist Dawn Ritch that Seaga's surveillance network had historically extended to bugging the telephones of his entire former Cabinet during their tenure in government.

The fallout from the scandal solidified a distinct dissident faction of five former cabinet ministers—Pearnel Charles, Karl Samuda, Edmund Bartlett, Errol Anderson, and Douglas Vaz—who were dubbed by political sociologist and pollster Professor Carl Stone as the "Gang of Five." Seaga deployed strict administrative and disciplinary mechanisms to suppress the rebellion and centralize authority. In May 1990, Seaga declined to reappoint Samuda and Bartlett to the Electoral Advisory Committee upon the expiration of their terms. In June 1990, the general membership revolted against Seaga's closest inner circle during internal elections, resoundingly voting down Grange's nomination to the JLP Standing Committee by a margin of 21 out of roughly 200 votes, alongside heavy ballot losses for allies George Ramocan and Tom Tavares-Finson. To control the structural bleeding, Seaga appointed Senator Audley Shaw as Chairman of the party's Public Relations Committee to streamline the dissemination of party info and handle press interactions. Concurrently, the proxy conflict spread to the party's youth arm, Young Jamaica, where members mutinied against their president, Darlon Francis, after he secretly leaked a list of delegates to the central leadership who had voted for a resolution demanding Seaga hold unconditional dialogue with the five dissident MPs.

By September 1990, Seaga escalated his actions against the faction by officially stripping Karl Samuda of his shadow portfolio as Opposition Spokesman on Public Utilities and Transport, citing a breach of collective responsibility after Samuda advocated for the deregulation of the foreign exchange system. Seaga then issued a directive through Chairman Bruce Golding forcing all JLP parliamentarians and senators to sign a strict loyalty oath reaffirming their commitment to collective responsibility by a fixed deadline, a maneuver fiercely criticized by anonymous MPs as a tool to legally purge the remaining dissidents.

In October 1990, Seaga issued a conditional olive branch to Charles, Bartlett, Anderson, and Vaz, offering to restore communication on the condition that they individually and publicly denounce their alignment with the faction. He simultaneously delivered an ultimatum to the JLP Standing Committee, threatening to resign as Leader of the party unless Karl Samuda was permanently expelled. Samuda was subsequently referred to a disciplinary committee chaired by Senator Ossie Harding. While the expulsions fractured the unity of the "Gang of Five"—prompting Samuda to break away completely while Bartlett chose a path of tactical conciliation to remain within the JLP—the crisis is recognized by historians as a primary catalyst for the deep internal fractures that eventually led Bruce Golding to split from the JLP to form the National Democratic Movement (NDM) in 1995.

== Leader of the Opposition ==
Seaga first served as Leader of Opposition from 1974 to 1980. The JLP was defeated in a landslide by Manley's PNP in the 1989 general election, by a margin of 45 seats to 15, and Seaga resumed the role of Leader of the Opposition, a position he held until 2005.

Seaga led the JLP to defeat in a number of subsequent elections against a PNP led by P. J. Patterson. In the 1993 general election, the PNP won 52 seats to the JLP's eight seats, while in the 1997 election, the PNP won 50 of 60 seats. Patterson's third consecutive victory came in the 2002 election, when the PNP retained power but with a reduced majority of 34 seats to 26. Patterson stepped down on 26 February 2006, and was replaced by Portia Simpson-Miller, Jamaica's first female prime minister.

During this period, Seafa suffered leadership challenges from a number of his colleagues, such as the "Gang of Five" of Errol Anderson, Edmund Bartlett, Karl Samuda, Douglas Vaz, and Pearnel Charles. In 1995, Bruce Golding left the JLP to form a new party, the National Democratic Movement (NDM).

In 2002, Golding rejoined the JLP and in November 2003 was again elected chairman of the party. On February 20, 2005, he was elected leader of the JLP, succeeding Seaga as Leader of the Opposition.

== Legal disputes and controversies ==
=== Defamation defeats ===
Seaga issued a public apology to Kenneth "Skeng Don" Black on December 17, 2003, following a legal dispute over defamation. The apology was part of a settlement after Black sued Seaga for slander/libel, claiming that Seaga had falsely stated he was illiterate and unable to read or write. The case had been ongoing since 2001, and the resolution included Seaga formally retracting his statements. As part of the out-of-court settlement, Seaga was required to broadcast the apology on radio and television and publish it in newspapers within seven days. He also agreed to pay Black's legal costs of $500,000 JMD, in four monthly instalments.

In 1996, Seaga, then Leader of the Opposition, made statements at a public meeting suggesting that Deputy Commissioner Leslie Harper was politically biased in his official duties. Harper sued Seaga for defamation, arguing that the statements damaged his reputation. The Supreme Court of Jamaica ruled against Seaga in 2003, awarding Harper J$3.5 million in damages, later reduced to J$1.5 million on appeal. Seaga then appealed to the Privy Council, but in 2008, the Council upheld the ruling, confirming that Seaga's statements were defamatory.

=== Relationship with Jim Brown ===
Investigations and political discourse surrounding Seaga's relationship with West Kingston community leaders have frequently highlighted allegations of direct interaction with gang elements. Journalist and author Frank Owen documented an account where eyewitnesses claimed to see Seaga drinking a beer with Lester "Jim Brown" Coke in Tivoli Gardens to celebrate Coke's acquittal in a late-1980s murder trial. Similar accounts resurfaced in national media retrospectives, documenting local eyewitness reports that claimed Seaga joined Coke to drink a beer within Tivoli Gardens to toast Coke's acquittal in a late-1980s murder trial. Seaga consistently and firmly denied all allegations of personal ties, collusion, or political protection involving the criminal network of the Shower Posse.

=== Presence at Lester Lloyd Coke's funeral and political fallout ===
Seaga's decision to attend Lester Lloyd Coke’s funeral in Kingston in 1992 while Leader of the Opposition sparked intense political debate. Coke was widely believed to be a key figure in the Shower Posse, a criminal organization involved in drug trafficking and violent activities, particularly in the United States. His sudden death in a fire at the General Penitentiary while awaiting extradition to the U.S. raised suspicions, with some believing he was silenced before he could disclose sensitive information.

Seaga defended his attendance, arguing that he was acting in his capacity as Member of Parliament for West Kingston, where Tivoli Gardens—Jim Brown’s stronghold—was located. However, critics viewed his presence as symbolic support for criminal networks and an example of the deep historical ties between politicians and gang-controlled communities.

This controversy resurfaced during the 2010 Tivoli Gardens incursion, when security forces clashed with gunmen loyal to Christopher "Dudus" Coke, Lester Coke’s son, leading to over 70 civilian deaths. The event reignited debates about the JLP’s connections to Tivoli Gardens’ criminal elements, with political analysts citing Seaga's attendance at Jim Brown's funeral as an example of such relationships.

Seaga's tenure as Member of Parliament for West Kingston (which includes Tivoli Gardens) was marked by allegations of political violence and criminal affiliations. Tivoli Gardens became known as a stronghold of the JLP, with reports linking it to organized crime. In 2001, a violent confrontation between police and gunmen in Tivoli Gardens resulted in 27 civilian deaths. Seaga personally entered the area during the gun battle, attempting to mediate, but later expressed deep resentment toward the security forces for their actions. His political influence over Tivoli Gardens remained controversial, with critics arguing that he had institutionalized political violence.

=== Tivoli Gardens and political garrison allegations ===
Seaga was instrumental in the development of Tivoli Gardens, transforming it from the slum known as Back O’Wall into a structured community. However, critics argue that Tivoli Gardens became Jamaica's first political garrison, meaning it was a stronghold of the Jamaica Labour Party (JLP), where political loyalty was enforced through intimidation. Seaga defended his role, stating that Tivoli Gardens was a community-development model aimed at improving living conditions. However, the area remained a flashpoint for political and gang-related conflicts, culminating in the 2010 Tivoli Gardens incursion.

=== "Blood for Blood, Fire for Fire" speech ===
In the 1960s, Seaga made the infamous statement: "Blood for blood, fire for fire", which was widely interpreted as a call for political retaliation. The phrase became symbolic of Jamaica's escalating political violence, particularly in the 1970s and 1980s, when clashes between JLP and People's National Party (PNP) supporters led to hundreds of deaths. Seaga later defended the statement, arguing that it was taken out of context and was meant to denounce violence rather than incite it. However, critics maintain that it contributed to Jamaica's turbulent political climate.

=== Allegations of U.S. involvement in 1980 elections ===
The 1980 general election was one of the bloodiest in Jamaica's history, with over 800 people killed in politically motivated violence. Reports later surfaced suggesting that Seaga's campaign received covert support from the U.S. government, including funding and intelligence assistance. Seaga denied any CIA involvement, stating that such claims were propaganda. However, political analysts argue that Jamaica's shift toward pro-Western policies under Seaga aligned with U.S. interests during the Cold War.

=== Leadership struggles and JLP infighting ===
Seaga led the JLP for over 30 years, but his leadership was often challenged internally. In the early 2000s, younger party members, including Bruce Golding, pushed for leadership changes, arguing that Seaga's style was outdated. Seaga eventually stepped down in 2005, marking the end of an era in Jamaican politics. His departure allowed the JLP to modernize its approach, leading to Golding's rise to power in 2007.

=== Allegations against James Robertson ===
In November 2003, Seaga, as leader of the JLP, raised concerns about the source of campaign financing within his party. He specifically questioned the legitimacy of funds used by James Robertson in his campaign for Deputy Leader of JLP's Area Council 2. The controversy escalated when Daryl Vaz, who managed Robertson's campaign finances, responded by challenging Seaga to provide evidence of his claims about "tainted money".

Seaga wrote to Prime Minister P. J. Patterson, requesting a meeting to discuss the broader issue of campaign financing and the conduct of candidates in sourcing and spending funds. Acting on a letter from Vaz, Police Commissioner Francis Forbes ordered an investigation into Seaga's allegations.

Vaz and Robertson's team considered legal action against Seaga, including a potential libel suit, unless he retracted his claims or provided concrete evidence. The dispute reflected deeper tensions within the JLP, particularly between Seaga and younger party members pushing for leadership changes.

== Contributions to independent Jamaica ==
=== Economic and financial development ===
Seaga established many of the financial institutions required in newly independent Jamaica to build a financial market for successful economic investment and growth, including the following:

- 1967, first Jamaican majority-owned commercial bank – Jamaica Citizens Bank (JCB)
- 1968, Jamaica Stock Exchange
- 1969, decimalization of the Jamaican currency
- 1969, nationalization of financial institutions - banks and insurance companies
- 1969, Introduction of merchant banking
- 1971, Jamaica Unit Trust
- 1972, Jamaica Mortgage Bank
- 1981, National Development Bank (NDB)
- 1981, Agricultural Credit Bank (ACB)
- 1982, Agro 21
- 1982, Divestment Programme, commencing with lease of government-owned hotels
- 1984, Self-Start Fund
- 1985, Comprehensive Tax Reforms including a flat income tax rate for all
- 1985, Solidarity Programme for micro-businesses
- 1986, Export-Import Bank (Ex-Im Bank)
- 1986, De-regulation of economy, commencing with removal of import licensing; later price controls
- 1986, Privatization of financial institutions – NCB
- 1987, JAMPRO (formerly JNIP)
- 1988, Digiport – first satellite telecommunications data processing operation – Montego Bay
- 1988, One Million Trees Programme

=== Planning and development ===
Rural and urban planning and the environment have been prime areas of development in Seaga's career. He has focused on waterfront development in the main coastal towns and cities, rural and urban township development programmes, and the development of parks and markets. They included the following:

- 1963, 5-Year Development Plan
- 1966, Redevelopment of Kingston Waterfront
- 1967, Comprehensively planned urban communities – runs out the rasta from the Back-o-Wall community claiming to redevelop as Tivoli Garden, a modern, fully planned urban development; Hellshire Hills development; Torrington Park
- 1967, Reclamation and development of Ocho Rios Waterfront (Turtle Beach)
- 1968, Urban Development Corporation
- 1969, Comprehensive development plan for infrastructure of many rural towns (later CRDTDP)
- 1971, 20-Year Physical Development Plan
- 1983, National Conference Centre - headquarters of the International Seabed Authority
- 1983, National Committee for Drug Abuse
- 1985, MPM - Beautification and Public Cleansing
- 1988, Reclamation of Montego Bay Waterfront
- 1988, Negril development (Bloody Bay)
- 1988, Social Well-being Plan

Various Times Land Bank - purchase of 50,000 acres of prime properties for future development (Negril, Orange Bay, Auchindown, Mt. Edgecombe, Seville, Laughing Water, Belmont (Dunns River), Winifred Rest Home property, Caymanas).

Various Times Development of several hotels - Kingston Waterfront, Ocho Rios, Negril.

=== Social programmes ===
Seaga was the architect of a wide range of social programmes which expanded training in human resources, aided small enterprises and protected the poor and vulnerable.

1963 Construction of the National Arena

1963 Things Jamaican - craft development

1963 Launching of the Drug Abuse Committee (later Council)

1964 100 Village Community Development Programme

1965 Community sports development on a structured islandwide basis

1965 The Golden Age Movement

1965 The National Volunteers

1970 Student Revolving Loan Fund for Higher Education

1971 National School Feeding Programme

1972 Establishment of Jamaica Racing Commission and Jockey School

1974 Institute of Mass Communication; later renamed Caribbean Institute of Media & Communication (CARIMAC)

1982 H.E.A.R.T. (Human Employment & Resource Training)

1984 Food Stamp Programme for elderly poor and lactating mothers

1984 ARP - Administrative Reform Programme for fundamental Civil Service reforms

1985 Golden Age Home for the elderly poor

1986 L.E.A.P. (Learning for Earning Activity Programme) for street children

1988 P.A.C.E. (Programme for Advancement of Early Childhood Education)

1988 Residential Halls for UWI, UTECH and Cultural Training Centre

=== Cultural programmes ===
Seaga established in independent Jamaica most of the institutions to build cultural awareness and national identity, as well as develop arts, crafts and national heritage.

1963 Jamaica Festival

1964 Promotion to launch Jamaican music (ska) abroad

1964 Return and interment of Marcus Garvey's body at Jamaica

1964 Order of National Heroes - Garvey first named hero

1964 National Heroes Park

1965–69 - development of several museums: Arawak, Port Royal

1967 Jamaica Journal publication (Institute of Jamaica)

1967 Research and recording of folk culture

1967 Devon House

1968 National Heritage Week

1971 Design of the Cultural Training Centre (Arts, Drama, Music, Painting & Sculpture)

1972 Jamaica Racing Commission and Jockey School

1986 Establishment of the Creative Production and Training Centre (CPTC)

1988 Planned development of heritage sites (Port Royal, Spanish Town, Seville)

1988 Media Divestment Programme, to establish several small private radio stations and church television

=== Institutional, parliamentary, political and constitutional reforms ===
Seaga is recognized as the initiator of some of the most important political, parliamentary and constitutional reforms which affect governance of the country.

1961 Member of the Parliamentary Commission which drafted the Constitution for independent Jamaica

1979 Electoral reforms: structure of EAC

1986 Establishment of Contractor General proposed in 1979

1986 Media Commission

1992 Constitutional Reform: Advocate General (renamed Public Defender)

1993 Constitutional Reform: Charter of Fundamental Rights and Freedoms

1994 Several Parliamentary reforms:

- to strengthen the independence of Parliament
- to allow non-Parliamentarians to address Parliament on issues

1994 Money Bills tabled in Parliament to regulate money supply by law

=== International programmes ===
Jamaica is recognized for initiating several far-reaching international programmes within the Caribbean region and worldwide, due to Seaga's proposals to create new international agreements.

1974 UNESCO International Fund for the Promotion of Culture (Culture Bank)

1982 Caribbean Basin Initiative (CBI)

1986 UNDP - United Nations International Short Term Advisory Resources - UNISTAR (Manpower Bank)

1986 Caribbean Democrat Union (CDU)

1986 CARIBCAN (Canada)

== Publications ==
- Parent Teacher Relationships, University of the West Indies, 1954
- "Faith Healing in Jamaica", International Parapsychology, 1955
- "Revival Spirit Cults", Jamaica Journal, Institute of Jamaica
- The Origins of Jamaican Popular Music
- Grenada Intervention: The Inside Story, 2009
- Revelations: Beyond Political Boundaries, Lectures 2005–2009
- Edward Seaga: My Life and Leadership: Clash of Ideologies, Volume 1, 2009
- Edward Seaga: Shaping History: Hard Road to Travel, Volume 2, 2010

== Recordings ==
- Folk Music of Jamaica (album recorded by Ethnic Folkways Library), 1978
- Reggae Golden Jubilee – Origins of Jamaican Music, released on 6 November 2012

== Personal life ==
On 22 August 1965, Seaga married Marie Elizabeth "Mitsy" Constantine, Miss Jamaica 1965. They had two sons, Christopher and Andrew, and a daughter Anabella. This marriage was dissolved in 1995.

On 14 June 1996, he married Carla Frances Vendryes. Their daughter Gabrielle was born 16 September 2002.

Seaga was deeply involved in cultural activities, particularly folk music and all aspects of Jamaican culture. A keen gardener and amateur landscaper, he developed The Enchanted Gardens, a resort in Saint Ann Parish.

As an athlete, Seaga played on several college and school teams: field hockey, cricket, football, rifle, tennis and swimming (diving). He participated as a member of various hunting clubs and the Jamaica Skeet Club.

== Civic activities ==
In West Kingston, Seaga became the president of the Tivoli Gardens Football, Basketball and Netball clubs. He then became Chairman of the Premier League Football Association and the Professional Football Association of Jamaica, with responsibility for the 12 Premier League teams and the staging of the Premier League.

== Later years and death ==
On 20 January 2005, Seaga retired as leader of the Jamaica Labour Party, a position he had held for 30 years. He retired as a Member of Parliament after serving for 43 years in the House of Representatives, in addition to two years in the Senate. He has the longest period of continuous service of any elected representative in the Caribbean region.

With appointments to academia at the University of the West Indies, the Institute of Jamaica and the University of Technology, he became engaged in research and writing, as well as teaching and leadership.

On 28 May 2019, his 89th birthday, Seaga died in Miami, Florida, where he had been receiving treatment for cancer. Seaga's body was repatriated to Jamaica on 2 June, and received a state funeral on 23 June, with religious services held at the Holy Trinity Cathedral before being laid to rest in National Heroes Park.

As of 2023, Seaga's portrait has been featured on the Jamaican $2000 bill alongside Michael Manley.

== Honours and awards ==
- 1980, Fortune Magazine named him as a "Man of the Year", the first and only such accolade to anyone in this region
- In 1981, Seaga was appointed by Queen Elizabeth II as a member of Her Majesty's Privy Council.
- In 2002, the Government of Jamaica awarded him the Order of the Nation, the second highest honour

In 2005, the University of the West Indies awarded him the honorary title of Distinguished Fellow for Life. He was also installed as a Fellow of the Institute of Jamaica, devoted to the arts and sciences.

- That year, he was appointed as Chancellor of the University of Technology

Seaga was also honoured by several other countries:

- 1981, Republic of Venezuela – Grand Collar de Libertador
- Republic of Venezuela – Gold Mercury International Award; and
- Republic of Korea – Grand Gwangwa Medal, Order of Diplomatic Service
- 1982, Federal Republic of Germany – Grand Cross of the Order of Merit
- 1987, Mexico – Order of the Aztec Eagle

He received several prestigious international awards:

- Gleaner Honour Awards: Man of the Year, 1980, 1981
- Avenue of the Americas Association, N.Y. – Gold Key Award (1981)
- American Friendship Medal bestowed by the Freedom Foundation, 1982
- Pan American Development Foundation Inter-American Man of the Year Development Award (1983)
- Dr. Martin Luther King Humanitarian Award (1984)
- United Nations Environment Programme – the Environmental Leadership Award (1987)

Seaga was appointed as a Distinguished Fellow by the University of the West Indies, Fellow of the Institute of Jamaica, and Pro-Chancellor of the University of Technology

Honorary Degrees:

- University of Miami, LL.D. (1981)
- Tampa University, LL.D. (1982)
- University of South Carolina, LL.D. (1983)
- Boston University, LL.D. (1983)
- University of Hartford, LL.D. (1987)

Political offices
| Preceded by Hugh Shearer | Leader of the Opposition; 1974–80 | Succeeded by Michael Manley |
| Preceded by Michael Manley | Prime Minister of Jamaica; 1980–89 | Succeeded by Michael Manley |
| Preceded by Michael Manley | Leader of the Opposition; 1989–2005 | Succeeded by Bruce Golding |
