= High Commission of Jamaica, London =

High Commission of Jamaica in London
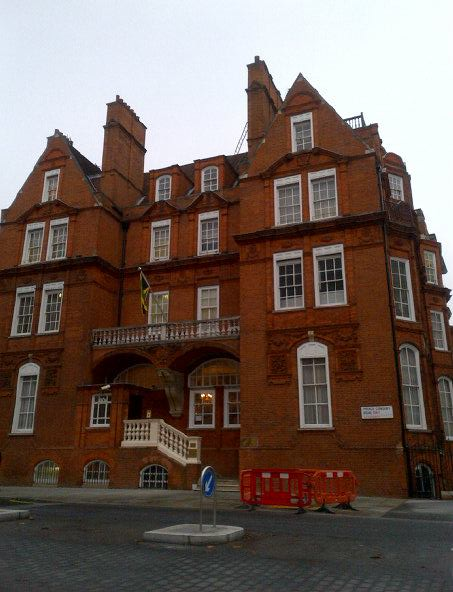
- Location: South Kensington, London
- Address: 1-2 Prince Consort Road, London
- Coordinates: 51°30′0.7″N 0°10′29.3″W
- High Commissioner: Alexander Williams

The High Commission of Jamaica in London is the diplomatic mission of Jamaica in the United Kingdom.

== History ==
The High Commission had its beginnings in 1962. Among the first diplomatic missions to be established after the attainment of independence from Britain, the office was initially located at Bruton and Grosvenor Streets, then on St James's Street, before eventually moving to its current location Prince Consort Road.

For many decades, Jamaicans have been travelling to England to work and study. In the 1940s many Jamaicans volunteered and fought alongside the British in World War II. In the post-war era, there was mass migration from Jamaica due labour shortages in the 'motherland', with the first arrivals aboard HMT Empire Windrush, bringing almost 500 Jamaicans to Britain. Waves of Jamaicans later emigrated to the United Kingdom for economic and educational reasons.

== Accreditation ==
The High Commission is also concurrently accredited as non-resident Ambassador to Cyprus, Denmark, Finland, Ireland, Norway, and Sweden. The appointment of Honorary Consuls in these countries has helped to facilitate the Mission's management of bilateral relations.

== List of high commissioners ==
Since Independence, fourteen Jamaican high commissioners have been accredited to the Court of St. James's, as follows:

- Sir Henry Laurence Lindo (August 1962 – December 1973)
- Arthur Wint (July 1974 – March 1978)
- Ernest Grafford Peart (September 1978 – August 1981)
- Herbert Walker (November 1981 – August 1988)
- Ellen Gray-Bogle (Sept 1989 – November 1993)
- Derick Heaven (April 1994 – May 1999)
- David Muirhead (July 1999 – August 2002)
- Maxine Roberts (September 2002 – December 2004)
- Gail Mathurin (April 2005 – September 2006)
- Burchell Whiteman (January 2007 – January 3, 2010)
- Anthony Johnson (May 2010 to May 2012)
- Aloun Ndombet-Assamba (May 2012 to May 2016)
- Seth George Ramocan (December 2016 – August 2022)
- Alexander Williams (October 2023 – present)

== Staff, roles and functions ==
The High Commission to the UK has a staff complement of 20 persons. It also houses the offices of the Jamaica Tourist Board, the Jamaica Information Service and the European Regional Office of Jamaica Trade and Invest.

=== High Commissioner ===
The High Commissioner, as head of the Mission, is responsible both to the Government of Jamaica and to the United Kingdom. The High Commissioner participates in the formation of Mission policy and its execution. The High Commissioner's primary aim is to foster, maintain and improve co-operation between Jamaica and these countries, as well as to develop trade, economic and tourism links and maintains contact with Jamaican nationals living in the UK through regular visits to communities, meetings, and functions.

=== Deputy High Commissioner ===
The Deputy High Commissioner deputizes all the functions of the High Commissioner, manages all administrative and financial matters, and oversees the Consular, Political and Community Development sections of the High Commission.

=== Political and Economic Department ===
The department considers and analyzes developments of a political, economic and commercial nature that relate to Jamaica. It is responsible for maintaining and enhancing contacts between Jamaica and the British government, Commonwealth Secretariat, the International Maritime Organization, the International Cocoa Organization, and the International Coffee Organization, among other multilateral entities.

=== Consular Section ===
The Consular Section is the service arm of the High Commission and interfaces with a large clientele of Jamaican nationals across the United Kingdom.

=== Diaspora development ===
Diaspora development is designed to strengthen relations between the Jamaica government and Jamaican nationals in the UK. Among activities that have taken place recently is the lobby against the Air Passenger Duty.

=== Community relations ===
The Community Relations Department maintains close links with the Jamaican community in the UK. There are now over 74 Jamaican organisations, 56 Caribbean organisations and 36 Afro- Caribbean Service Centres listed on the High Commission's database. The Community Relations Officer encourages the formation and continuing development of community groups and associations, participates in community events, disseminates information on Jamaica, provides welfare advice to needy Jamaicans, and coordinates and facilitates donations to Jamaica.

The High Commission in recent years has targeted youth organisations. For example, the Young Minds Group initiative solicits the advice and ideas of Jamaican students in the UK regarding Jamaica's national development.

=== Finance and Administration Department ===
The main functions of the Finance and Administration Department are:

1. To manage and co-ordinate the financial activities of the High Commission, Jamaica Information Service (JIS) and Jamaica Defence Force (JDF).
2. To deal with personnel and staff matters, the general operation and maintenance of the Mission's facilities, and the computer system.

== Gallery ==
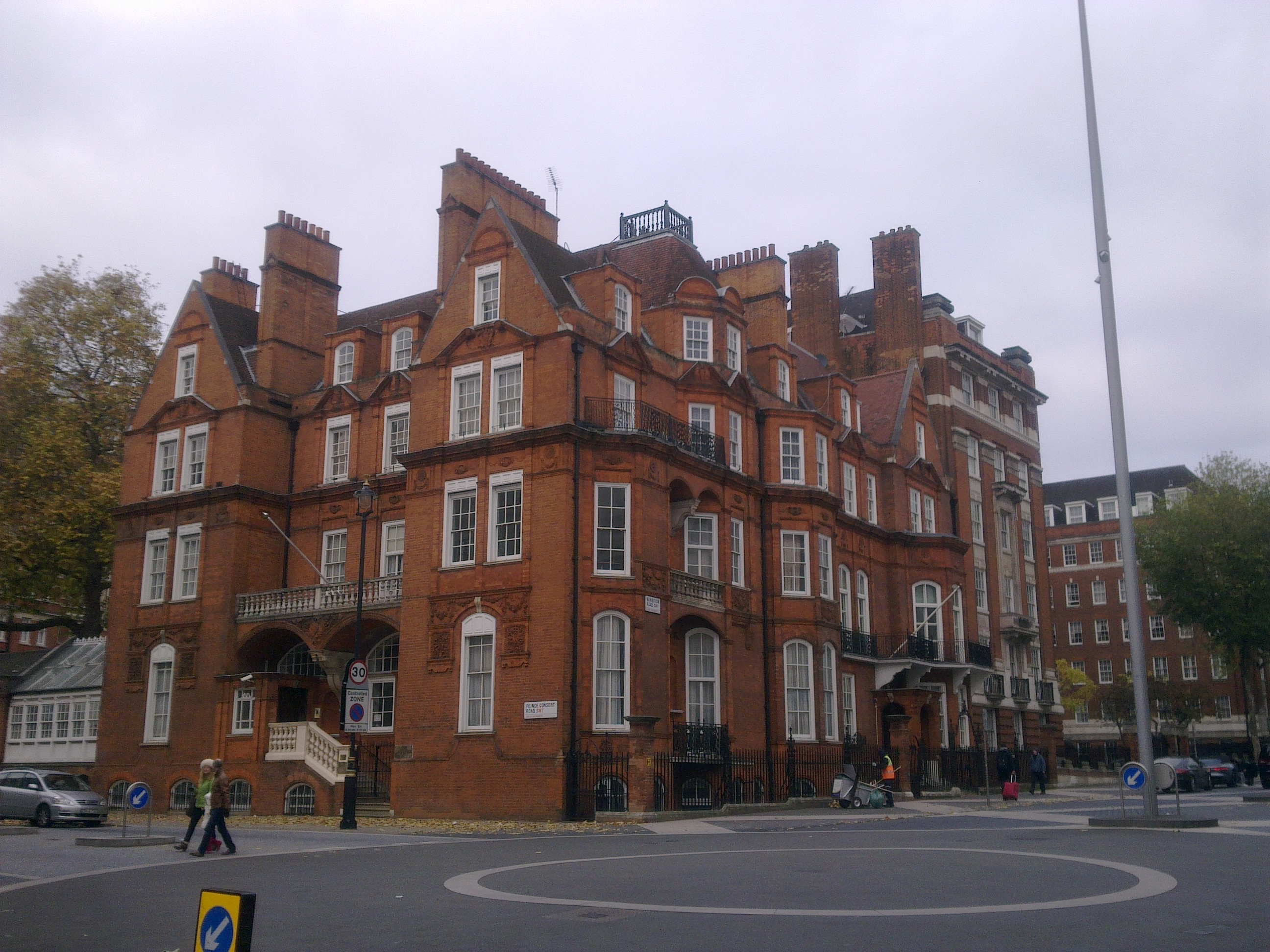
The High Commission

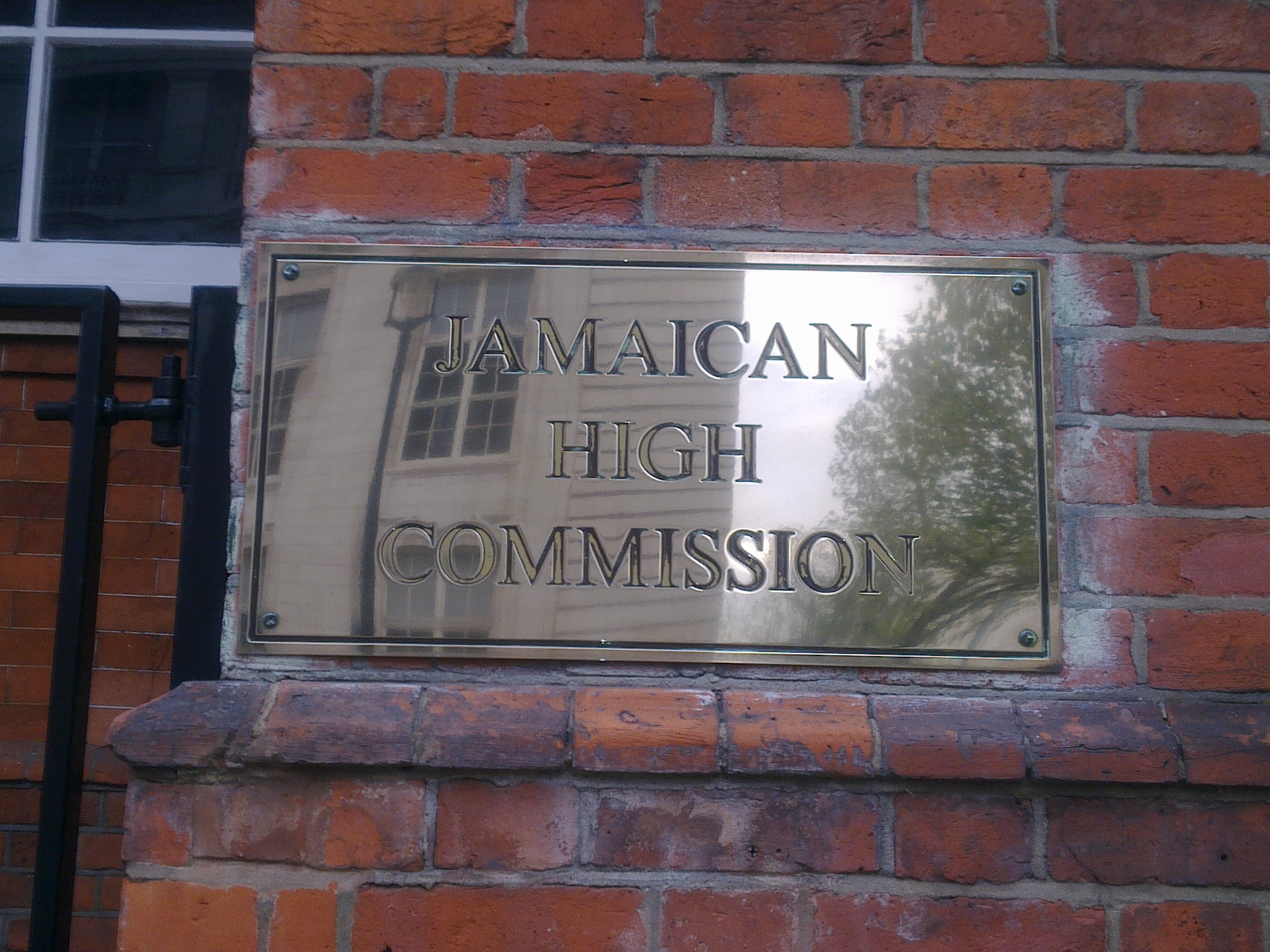
Plaque outside the High Commission

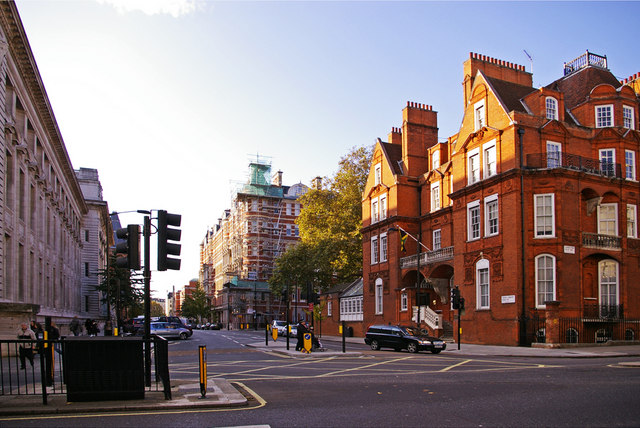
Looking down Prince Consort Road, with the High Commission on the right
