= Ferncourt High School =

- Emblem

Location
- Claremont, & a 2nd Campus in Brown's Town, St Ann; Jamaica; 18.3312°N 77.1697°W

Information
- Motto: Labor Vincit (Hard Work Conquers)
- Founded: 1938
- Founder: Mrs. Iris Simpson
- Chairman: Ms. Thelma Johill
- Administrator: Mrs. Gloria Edwards-Harriott
- Principal: Reverend Lenworth Sterling
- Age: 11 to 19

Ferncourt High School is a co-educational high school in Claremont, St Ann. The school has around 1500 students.

== Curriculum ==
Students enter at 1st form (7th grade) and continue to 5th form (11th grade)

They sit various subjects in the CXC and CCSLC exams. Recently, a 6th form (12 -13th grade) programme has been added.

== History ==
The school opened in 1938 from a building once owned by Dr. Curphey. At this time, the school welcomed its first set of girls who all boarded on the school's compound.

Former principal Mrs. Simpson created a curriculum encompassing the study of French, Latin, Music and fundamentals like social etiquette.

It is privately owned, so acceptance was mainly based on the character and resources of parents, and whether the student was well-behaved and disciplined.

In 1955, the Government of Jamaica officially recognised the school. After societal and cultural changes; the school introduced a new curriculum focusing on technical subjects, e.g. (biology, entrepreneurship, sociology).

In 1959, the school reached 226 students shortly after becoming a co-educational institution—invoking a steady growth in its population.

In contrary to other traditional high schools in Jamaica, Ferncourt has a Technical Department and is the only government-owned traditional high school in Region Three.

== Extracurricular activities ==
Clubs and Societies: 4-H Club – Red Cross Society Jamaica Combined Cadet Force Tourism Action Plan Environment Club Girls Guide Social Graces United Nations Wellness Club ISCF Photography/Astronomy Club Music Club Spanish Club Dance Group Mathematics club Sporting Activities: Track & Field Netball

For sports the school population is divided into five houses:

- Curphy
- Simpson
- Jacob
- Brown
- Smith

== Emblems ==
Motto

The school's motto is "Labor Vincit" which, when translated to English, means "Hard work conquers".

== Notable alumni ==
- Seymour Mullings, former Deputy Prime Minister in the PNP administration of the 70s and 80s.
- Aloun Assamba, former Minister of Tourism and MP for Southeast St Ann.
- Novlene Williams-Mills, Jamaican Track and field representative, multiple time Olympics, World and Commonwealth Games medalist.

== Headmasters ==
The principal is Reverend Lenworth Sterling.

== See also ==
- Education in Jamaica
- List of Schools in Jamaica
