= Mark Golding =

Jamaican politician (born 1965)

The Honourable Mark Golding MP
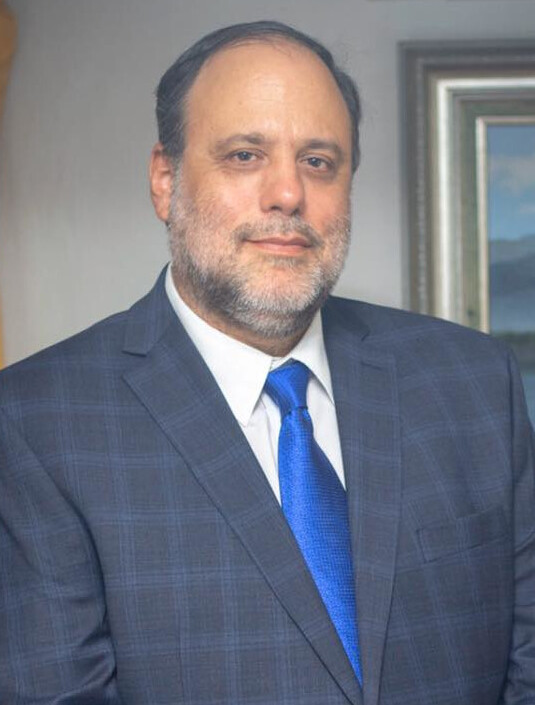
- Golding in 2020

Leader of the Opposition
- Incumbent
- Assumed office 11 November 2020
- Monarchs: Elizabeth II; Charles III
- Prime Minister: Andrew Holness
- Governor General: Sir Patrick Allen
- Preceded by: Peter Phillips

Minister of Justice
- In office 5 January 2012 – February 2016
- Prime Minister: Portia Simpson-Miller
- Preceded by: Delroy Chuck
- Succeeded by: Delroy Chuck

President of the People's National Party
- Incumbent
- Assumed office November 2020
- Preceded by: Peter Phillips

Member of Parliament for Saint Andrew Southern
- Incumbent
- Assumed office 7 November 2017
- Preceded by: Omar Davies

Member of the Senate of Jamaica
- In office September 2007 – January 2012

Personal details
- Born: Mark Jefferson Golding; 19 July 1965 (age 61) Mona, St Andrew, Jamaica
- Citizenship: Jamaica
- Party: People's National Party
- Spouse: Sandra Golding
- Relations: Sir John Golding (father)
- Children: 3
- Education: Campion College; Oxford University (LLB); Norman Manley Law School; University of London (LLM)
- Occupation: Politician, investment banker
- Profession: Attorney

Mark Jefferson Golding (born 19 July 1965) is a Jamaican politician, who has been Leader of the Opposition of Jamaica and President of the People's National Party (PNP) since 2020.

Previously an attorney-at-law and investment banker, Golding was a member of the Senate of Jamaica from 2007 to 2017 and served as Minister of Justice from 2012 to 2016 in the government of Portia Simpson-Miller. He was elected as Member of Parliament for South St Andrew in a by-election in 2017.

On 7 November 2020, Mark Golding was elected as the 6th president of the PNP after polling 1,740 delegate votes to defeat Lisa Hanna who polled 1,440 in an election that saw 96% voter turnout amongst delegates in the 2020 People's National Party leadership election.

== Early life ==
Golding was born in 1965 in Mona, St Andrew, Jamaica at the University Hospital of the West Indies. He is the younger of two children born to Patricia (née Levy) and Sir John Golding. His mother was born in England, the daughter of a Jamaican doctor from Westmoreland Parish and his Australian wife. His father was born in England and moved to Jamaica in 1953 where he became a pioneering orthopaedic surgeon and rehabilitation physician. His paternal grandparents were Lithuanian Jews who arrived in the United Kingdom in the 1890s.

Golding later recalled that he "grew up on the university campus in the 1970s, at a time when progressive thinking, and the anti-apartheid movement were powerful currents around me and I have always had a progressive orientation as a youth coming up." Golding was educated at Mona Prep, Campion College, Jamaica, Marlborough College, University of Oxford and University College London.

== Business career ==
Golding was admitted to the bar in 1990 and joined the Hart Muirhead Fatta Law firm.

Golding co-founded Dehring Bunting & Golding (DB&G) in March 1992, alongside Christopher Dehring and Peter Bunting, and served as company secretary. DB&G was Jamaica's first privately owned investment bank. In June 1994, DB&G were appointed by the National Investment Bank of Jamaica to handle the divestment of $150 million of shares in the domestic airline Trans-Jamaican Airlines. In December 1994, he told the Financial Gleaner that the Money Lending Act should be repealed or amended, because it was "an inhibition to the progress of the commercial paper market."

Over the course of his career, Golding has served as a director at GraceKennedy Limited Caribbean Information, Credit Rating Services Limited, and the Bank of Nova Scotia under Scotia Limited. Golding is also the chairman of the Mona Rehabilitation Foundation and of Arnett Gardens F.C. In 2010, Golding co-founded Proven Investment Limited, a publicly listed investment company.

== Political career ==
Golding was appointed to the Senate of Jamaica in 2007 by then-prime minister Portia Simpson-Miller, who named him as the Minister of Justice after the PNP electoral victory in the 2011 Jamaican general election. He was also named Chairman of the Legislation Committee of Cabinet. During this 4-year term, 121 Acts of Parliament were passed. Golding was behind the island-wide decriminalization of marijuana. In 2017, Golding was elected to Parliament as the representative for South St. Andrew.

After the PNP's loss in the 2020 Jamaican general election, Golding announced his intention to run for leadership of the party. Golding won the Presidency of the PNP on November 7, 2020, defeating Lisa Hanna. He received praise for the upstanding nature of his campaign.

Golding led the party in the 2025 Jamaican general election; while they again lost to the JLP, the party doubled their seats and increased their vote significantly. Golding was re-elected in his own seat overwhelmingly.

== Personal life ==
Golding spoke at the funeral of his father, John, in 1996, describing him as "a constant example of how life could and should be lived." He called on the government to support the institutions he helped create.

Golding married his wife, Sandra, in 1990. They have three children. He was a musician throughout his time at Oxford University.
