= Omar Davies =

Jamaican politician (born 1947)

The Honourable Dr. Omar Davies MP
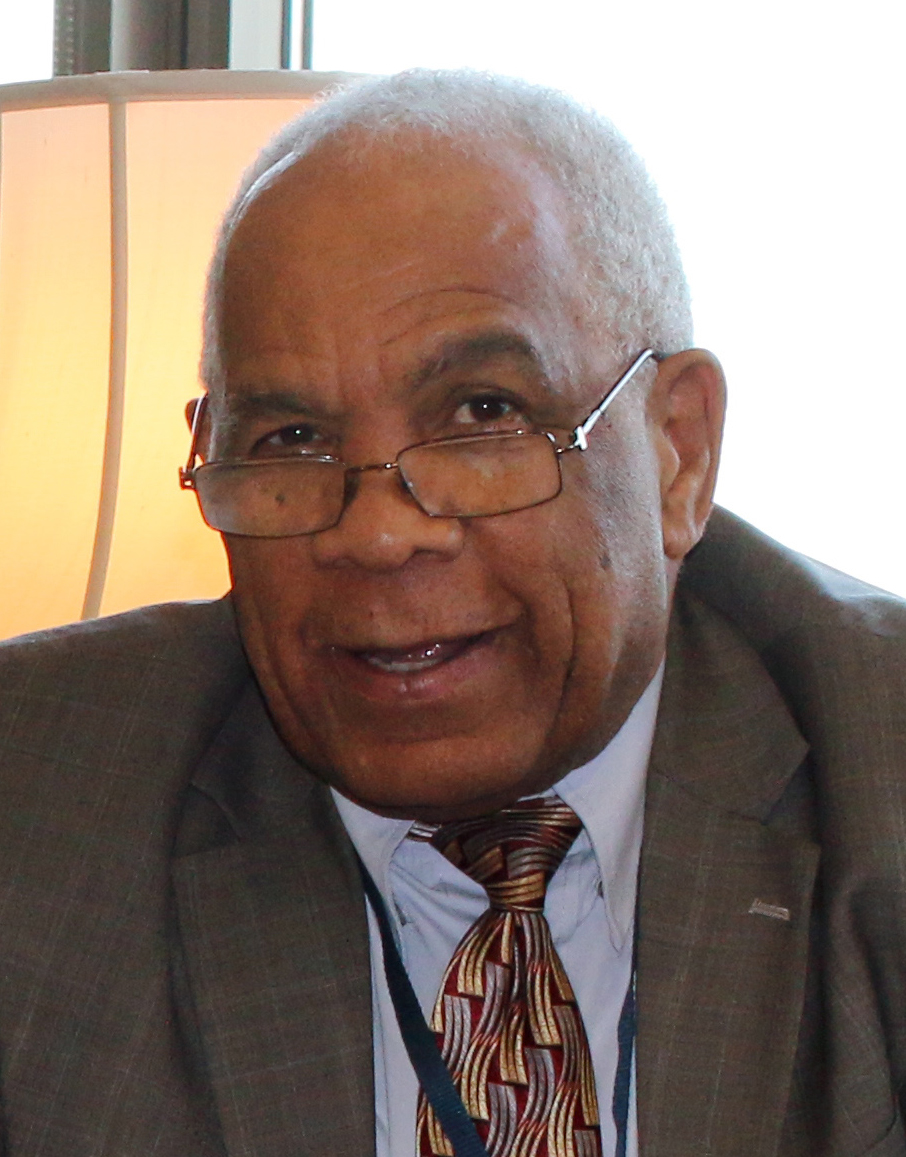

Minister of Transport, Works and Housing
- In office 9 January 2012 – 7 March 2016
- Deputy: Fitz Jackson
- Preceded by: Audley Shaw

Minister of Finance and the Public Service
- In office December 1993 – August 2007
- Preceded by: Hugh Small
- Succeeded by: Audley Shaw

Member of Parliament for Saint Andrew Southern
- In office 1993–2017
- Succeeded by: Mark Golding

Personal details
- Born: 28 May 1947 (age 78) Four Paths, Clarendon, Colony of Jamaica, British Empire
- Party: The People's National Party
- Spouse: Rose Davies
- Profession: Educator and Economist

Omar Davies (born 28 May 1947) is a Jamaican former politician and academic. A member of the People's National Party (PNP), Davies was Minister of Finance from 1993 to 2007.

== Early life ==
Davis was born in Four Paths, Clarendon, Jamaica on 28 May 1947. He attended Glenmuir High School, the University of the West Indies in Mona, St. Andrews. In 1973, he graduated from Northwestern University in Illinois, United States with a Doctorate in Economics.

== Career ==
Prior to joining politics, Davies was an academic. From 1973 to 1975, he was an assistant professor at Stanford University. From 1981 to 1989, he was Senior Lecturer at the economics department of the University of the West Indies as well as Senior Research Fellow at the Institute of Social and Economic Research. From 1989 to 1993, Davies was the director-general of the Planning Institute of Jamaica, while also working at the Ministry of Finance and Planning as Special Adviser to the minister. He represented Jamaica as a negotiator at the International Monetary Fund, the World Bank, and the Inter-American Development Bank.

Davies was elected to parliament representing Saint Andrew Southern. From April 1993 to August 1993, he worked at the Office of the Prime Minister with an interest in Planning, Development and Project Implementation. From August 1993 to November 1993, he was Minister without Portfolio in the Ministry of Finance. In December 1993, Davies became Minister of Finance and Planning, a position he held till 2007. He was appointed Minister of Transport in January 2012. Davies retired from politics on 29 June 2017.

== Public opinion ==
Wesly Morris, writing for The Gleaner, was critical of Davies' tenure as finance minister, blaming him for the "breakdown in the Jamaican economy in the 1990s". Garfield Higgins of the Jamaica Observer called Davies "the worst financial minister since political independence", adding that his retirement "will mark the end of an era which thousands of Jamaicans will unhappily remember for many years to come."
