= Burchell Whiteman =

Jamaican politician and diplomat

The Honourable Burchell Whiteman OJ

Jamaican High Commissioner to the United Kingdom
- In office January 2007 – January 2010
- Prime Minister: Portia Simpson-Miller; Bruce Golding
- Preceded by: Gail Mathurin
- Succeeded by: Anthony Johnson

Minister of Education
- In office 1992–2002

Personal details
- Born: Burchell Anthony Whiteman; 30 March 1938 (age 88) May Pen, Clarendon, Jamaica
- Spouse: Joline
- Children: 2
- Education: University College; Birmingham University

Burchell Anthony Whiteman OJ (born 30 March 1938) is a Jamaican former politician. A member of the People's National Party (PNP), he served as a Member of Parliament, the Jamaican High Commissioner to the United Kingdom, Minister of Education, and Minister of Information.

== Early life ==
Burchell Anthony Whiteman was born on February 21, 1938 in May Pen, the son of educator Edgar James Whiteman and homemaker and social worker Merab Whiteman. He studied at Munro College from 1949 to 1955 on a government scholarship that he earned on the basis of being the top student in Clarendon Parish, Jamaica. While at Munro, Whiteman was active in sports and performance arts, while also serving as house captain and head prefect. Whiteman graduated from the University College of the West Indies (now University of the West Indies) with a degree in English with French and later obtained a master's degree in education from Birmingham University.

== Career ==
Whiteman was the principal of York Castle High School and Brown’s Town Community College. He also chaired the board of the University Council of Jamaica. He entered politics in 1989 as a member of the People's National Party (PNP) and was elected as Member of Parliament for Saint Ann North Western. In 1992, Whiteman became Minister of Education. In 2002, he was appointed Minister of Information. In 2007, he was appointed High Commissioner to the United Kingdom, a position he held till end-December 2009. In 2014, he received an appointment to the council of the University of Technology, Jamaica.

He contributed a foreword to Education Theory and Practice: Caribbean Perspectives (2003).

== Recognition ==
On 29 March 2006, Whiteman was awarded the Order of Jamaica in recognition of his contribution to education and to the legislature. In January 2013, the Council of Community Colleges of Jamaica (CCCJ) honoured Whiteman for his contributions to education in Jamaica: "(he) recognised the uniqueness of the colleges that are strategically placed, making it easier for students to access quality education at an extremely affordable cost." In October 2015, he was conferred an honorary Doctor of Laws by the University of the West Indies.
