= Gail Mathurin =

Jamaican ambassador

Gail Marie Mathurin
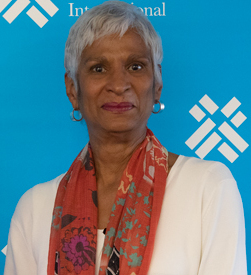
- Mathurin in 2019

High Commission of Jamaica, London of Jamaica to United Kingdom
- In office January 2007 – January 3, 2010
- Preceded by: Maxine Eleanor Roberts
- Succeeded by: Burchell Whiteman

Permanent Representative of Jamaica to the United Nations Office at Geneva of Jamaica to United Nationsde:Liste der jamaikanischen Botschafter in der Schweiz
- In office 2006 – July 2, 2007

Permanent Representative of Jamaica to the United Nations (Vienna), of Jamaica to United Nations
- In office July 2, 2007 – January 3, 2010

Personal details
- Born: 1960 (age 65–66)
- Parent: Lucille Mathurin Mair nee Walrond was born in Jamaica in 1924 (mother)
- Education: degree in Sociology and History and a Diploma in Mass Communications from the University of the West Indies, Jamaica.

Gail Mathurin (born 1960) is a Jamaican ambassador.

- From 1998 to 2002 she was Senior Director, Foreign Trade Department, Ministry of Foreign Affairs and Foreign Trade.
- From 2002 to 2005 she was Under-Secretary, Foreign Trade Division, Ambassador for External Negotiations, Ministry of Foreign Affairs and Foreign Trade, Non-resident Ambassador to Argentina, Brazil and Uruguay.
- From April 2005 to September 2006 she was High Commissioner in London and Non-resident Ambassador to Denmark, Finland, Norway and Spain.
- From 2006 to July 2, 2007 she was Permanent Representative to the United Nations Office at Geneva and Permanent Representative to the World Trade Organization.
- From July 2, 2007 to July 2, 2007 she was Permanent Representative to the United Nations Office at Vienna.
