= Kenneth Russell (Jamaican politician) =

Jamaican politician

MP for Saint Ann South Eastern
- Incumbent
- Assumed office 3 September 2025
- Preceded by: Lisa Hanna

Personal details
- Party: People's National Party
- Education: Howard University (BA, MEd); Harvard Graduate School of Education (EdD)
- Website: kennethrussellsesa.com

Kenneth Russell is a Jamaican politician from the People's National Party who has been MP for Saint Ann South Eastern since 2025.

Russell was selected to succeed has been selected to replace Lisa Hanna. Russell hails from Bensonton.
