= Duane Stephenson =

Jamaican reggae singer (born c. 1976)

- Born: c. 1976; Kingston, Jamaica
- Genres: Reggae
- Years active: Mid-1990s–present
- Label: VP
- Website: duanestephensonreggae.com

Duane Stephenson (born c. 1976) is a Jamaican reggae singer who has released three albums on VP Records, and works primarily in the roots reggae genre.

== Career ==
Born in Kingston, Stephenson was the singer in the band To Isis for ten years before recording as a solo artist from 2005. He began to release solo records 2005, starting with the single "24 Hours" in 2005. He signed to VP Records, who released his first album, From August Town, in 2007. The album was included in Billboard's "Six Essential Albums Heralding Roots Rock's Resurgence" in 2008, with Patricia Meschino commenting on the album's "beautifully nuanced vocals and heartfelt lyrics". He went on perform at Reggae Sumfest and toured with Dean Fraser, playing throughout the Caribbean, the United States, and Europe.

His second album, Black Gold, was released in 2010. The same year he toured with The Wailers Band on their tour of the United States and South America, after recording the anti-hunger song "A Step For Mankind" with the band for the Solutions for Dreamers: Season 3 album, released to funds for the United Nations World Food Program.

In January 2014 he performed Rebel Salute.

Third album Dangerously Roots: Journey from August Town was recorded over two years and released in September 2014. The album includes a cover version of Bunny Wailer's "Cool Runnings", which was issued as a single. Guest artists on the album include Tarrus Riley, Lutan Fyah, and I-Octane. Dangerously Roots entered the Billboard Top Reggae Albums chart at number 6 and rose to number 4.

Stephenson's fourth album, Exile to Jedi, is set for release by VP Records in February 2019.

== Discography ==
=== Albums ===
- From August Town (2007), VP
- Black Gold (2010), VP
- Dangerously Roots: Journey from August Town (2014), VP
- Weekend Dude (2025), Penthouse Records/VP Records

=== EPs ===
- Soon As We Rise (2014), Kingston Songs

=== Singles ===
- "24 Hours" (2005), No Doubt
- "Fairy Tale"/"August Town" (2007), Cannon Production
- "More Than Words" (2008), Jamplified
- "You Are Not Alone" (2008), Rhythm of Life
- "Crying Out" (2009), No Doubt
- "You Too Bad" (2011), Penthouse
- "Don't Let Him" (2013), Penthouse - with Exco Levi
- "Rasta For I" (2014)
- "Cool Runnings" (2014), VP
- "Play That Song" (2018), VP
