= Peter Phillips (Jamaican politician) =

Jamaican politician (born 1949)

Dr The Honourable Peter Phillips OJ
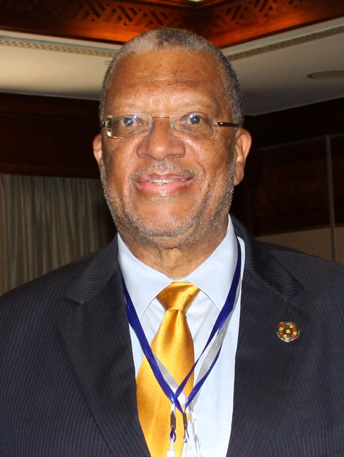
- Phillips in 2015

Leader of the Opposition
- In office 3 April 2017 – 11 November 2020
- Prime Minister: Andrew Holness
- Preceded by: Portia Simpson Miller
- Succeeded by: Mark Golding

Shadow Minister for Finance, Planning and the Public Service
- In office 7 March 2016 – December 2020
- Prime Minister: Andrew Holness
- Preceded by: Audley Shaw

Minister of Finance, Planning and the Public Service
- In office 5 January 2012 – 7 March 2016
- Prime Minister: Portia Simpson-Miller
- Preceded by: Audley Shaw
- Succeeded by: Audley Shaw

Deputy Prime Minister of Jamaica
- In office January 2012 – March 2016
- Prime Minister: Portia Simpson-Miller
- Preceded by: Kenneth Baugh
- Succeeded by: Horace Chang (2020)

Minister of National Security
- In office 2002 – 11 September 2007
- Prime Minister: Percival James Patterson
- Preceded by: K.D. Knight
- Succeeded by: Trevor MacMillan

President of the People's National Party
- In office 26 March 2017 – 7 November 2020
- Preceded by: Portia Simpson-Miller
- Succeeded by: Mark Golding

MP for Saint Andrew East Central
- In office 1993–2025
- Succeeded by: Dennis Gordon

Personal details
- Born: 28 December 1949 (age 76) Kingston, Jamaica
- Party: People's National Party
- Spouse: Sandra Minott
- Children: 6, including Mikael Phillips
- Education: University of the West Indies (BSc, MSc); State University of New York (PhD)
- Other offices held: 1995–1997: Minister of Health; 1980–2001: Minister of Transport and Works

Peter David Phillips OJ MP (born 28 December 1949) is a Jamaican politician who served as the Member of Parliament for Saint Andrew East Central from 1993 to 2025. Phillips is the former president of the People's National Party and former Leader of the Opposition. He served as Minister of Finance and Planning and Deputy Prime Minister of Jamaica from 2012 to 2016.

== Early life ==
Phillips was born in Kingston to Mico Teachers' College lecturer Aubrey Sylvester Phillips and civil servant Thelma Limonius Phillips. Aubrey was a graduate of Mico, where he had roomed with Howard Cooke, who would later become Governor-General of Jamaica.

He spent some of his infancy in Manchester Parish where both his mother's and father's parents lived. The family returned to Kingston and he started pre-school there before moving to Saint Ann Parish where his father took up a new job as principal of Moneague Teachers' College.

Phillips lived in the United Kingdom between ages six and nine while his father studied for a PhD there, and then returned to Jamaica, where he attended Jamaica College as a boarder.

Phillips holds a bachelor's degree in Economics, a Master's in Government (from The University of the West Indies), and a Doctorate in Sociology from the State University of New York at Binghamton (USA).

== Political career ==
Phillips first entered parliament as an appointed senator after the People's National Party won the 1989 general elections. He served as Minister of State in the Office of the Prime Minister until 1991, when he was appointed PNP General Secretary and Minister of Special Projects in the Office of the Prime Minister. He remained in post until 1994, when he was elected to parliament as the member for Saint Andrew East Central. He served as MP for that constituency for the duration of his political career.

Phillips served as minister of health under Prime Minister P.J. Patterson from 1995 to 1997. In 1998, Patterson appointed him minister of transport and works. He was elected a vice president of the PNP in 1999, serving with Portia Simpson Miller. He was subsequently appointed minister of national security.

Phillips twice unsuccessfully ran for President of the PNP in 2006 and 2008. He lost ministerial office when the PNP lost the 2007 elections. However, after the party won the 2011 elections, he was appointed Minister of Finance and Public Service. Simpson-Miller also named him Deputy Prime Minister in an apparent attempt at party unity.

=== Party leader ===
The PNP lost the 2016 elections, after which Simpson Miller stood down as leader and Phillips won the subsequent leadership election in 2017. In 2019 he was challenged for the leadership by Peter Bunting, but was re-elected in the September vote.

In the 2020 Jamaican general election, he was defeated by current Prime Minister, Andrew Holness, by a 49-14 seat margin. However, the turnout at this election was just 37%, probably affected by the coronavirus pandemic. He resigned as Opposition Leader and PNP President after the defeat, triggering the 2020 People's National Party leadership election.

Phillips retired at the 2025 Jamaican general election.
