= Saint Ann South Eastern =

Parliamentary constituency of Jamaica

Saint Ann South Eastern is a parliamentary constituency represented in the House of Representatives of the Jamaican Parliament. It elects one Member of Parliament MP by the first past the post system of election. The seat is considered a safe seat for the People's National Party.

== Boundaries ==
The constituency covers the communities of Claremont, Calderwood, Bensonton and Moneague. Since 2025, it has been held by Kenneth Russell from the People's National Party. It was previously represented by former Miss World, Lisa Hanna.

General Election 2020: Saint Ann South Eastern
Party	Candidate	Votes	%	±%
PNP	Lisa Hanna	5,124	50.00	
JLP	Delroy Grantson	5,110	50.00	
Total votes		10,234	100.0	
Turnout			34.00	
PNP hold				

General Election 2016: Saint Ann South Eastern
Party	Candidate	Votes	%	±%
PNP	Lisa Hanna	8,056	62.09	
JLP	Ivan Anderson	4,919	37.91	
Total votes		12,975	100.0	
Turnout			43.64	
PNP hold				

General Election 2011: Saint Ann South Eastern
Party	Candidate	Votes	%	±%
PNP	Lisa Hanna	8,996	65.44	
JLP	Oneil Esteen	4,751	34.56	
Total votes		13,747	100.0	
Turnout			50.86	
PNP hold				

General Election 2007: Saint Ann South Eastern
Party	Candidate	Votes	%	±%
PNP	Lisa Hanna	7,134	61.55	
JLP	Peter Fakhourie	4,456	38.45	
Total votes		11,590	100.0	
Turnout			65.67	
PNP hold				

General Election 2002: Saint Ann South Eastern
Party	Candidate	Votes	%	±%
PNP	Aloun Ndombet-Assamba	7,419	63.49	
JLP	Peter Fakhourie	4,242	36.30	
NDM/NJA	Rev. Leeroy James Campbell	25	0.21	
Total votes		11,686	100.0	
Turnout			66	
PNP hold				
