= 2011 Jamaican general election =

- 29 December 2011

All 63 seats in the House of Representatives 32 seats needed for a majority
- Turnout: 53.17% (▼8.29pp)
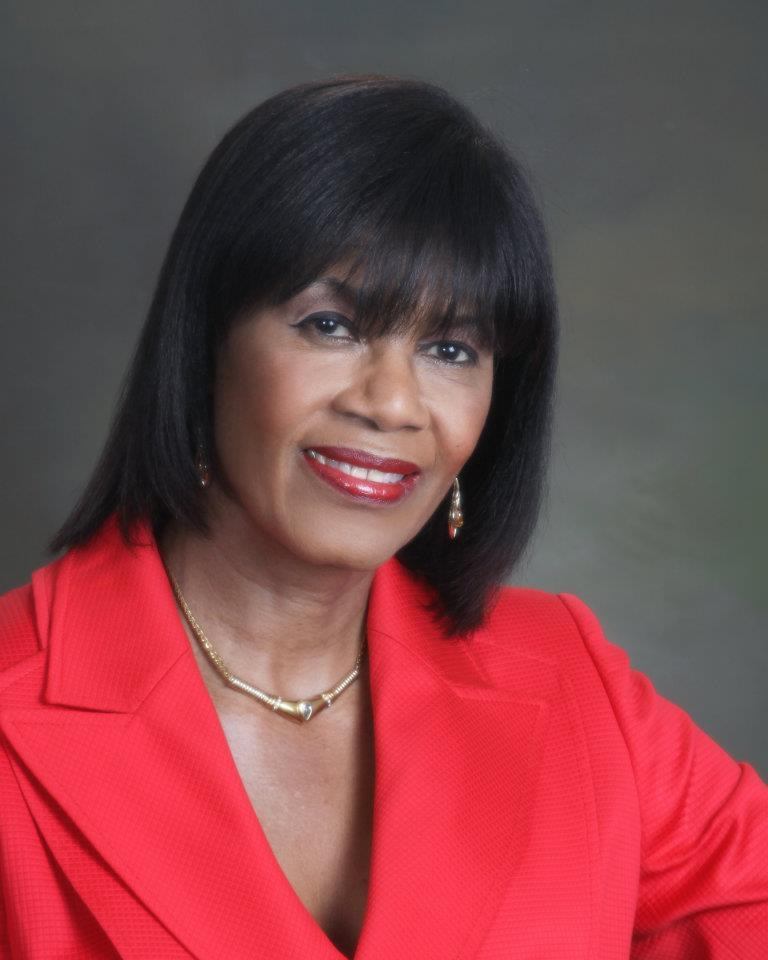

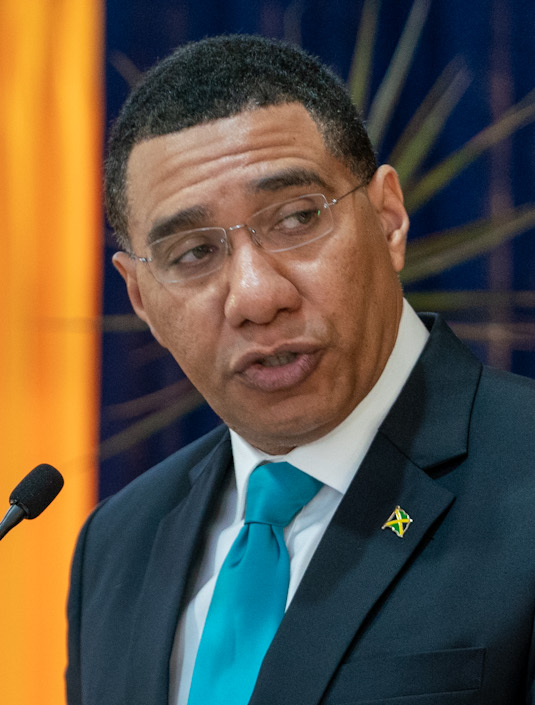
	First party	Second party
Leader	Portia Simpson-Miller	Andrew Holness
Party	PNP	JLP
Last election	49.64%, 28 seats	50.27%, 32 seats
Seats won	42	21
Seat change	▲14	▼11
Popular vote	463,232	405,234
Percentage	52.96%	46.32%
Swing	▲3.32pp	▼3.95pp
- Results by constituency
Prime Minister before election
Andrew Holness
JLP
Prime Minister after election
Portia Simpson-Miller
PNP

General elections were held in Jamaica on 29 December 2011. The elections were contested mainly between the nation's two major political parties, the governing Jamaica Labour Party (JLP), led by Andrew Holness, and the Portia Simpson-Miller-led opposition People's National Party (PNP). The result was a landslide victory for the PNP which won 42 of the 63 seats, a two-thirds majority.

== Background ==
Since the previous elections in 2007, the number of seats had been increased from 60 (an even number) to 63 (an odd number). The close results of the 2007 general election spurred the change as the Electoral Commission concluded that a tie would not be resolved.

== Opinion polls ==
Opinion polls indicated a slim lead for the opposition PNP six days before the election. The win by the PNP shocked even its leaders, such as Peter Phillips who said that "the results certainly exceeded our most optimistic scenarios". Reports from the Electoral Office of Jamaica indicated that only just over 50 per cent of the entire voting population voted on Election Day, meaning that it was possible for the lower-than-usual voter turnout to have thrown off opinion polls' predictions for the result.

== Results ==
The People's National Party (PNP) secured 42 seats out of 63 in a result described as a landslide victory. No minor parties won seats in the new Parliament. As a result, the PNP ended four years of rule for the Labour Party, which won 21 seats. Several Labour Party cabinet ministers lost their seats, including National Security Minister Dwight Nelson and Energy Minister Clive Mullings.

As a result, Portia Simpson-Miller assumed the role of Prime Minister for the second time in 5 years and Andrew Holness became one of the shortest-serving Prime Ministers in the history of Jamaica.

Polling was reported to have proceeded fairly smoothly, despite glitches with fingerprint scanners at some polling stations, and without the violence that has marred previous elections. The Organization of American States sent an observation mission to oversee the elections and they reported that they had not witnessed "any disturbances or any issues that would cause us any serious concern".

Party	Votes	%	Seats	+/–
People's National Party	464,064	53.28	42	+14
Jamaica Labour Party	405,920	46.61	21	–11
Marcus Garvey People's Progressive Party	420	0.05	0	New
National Democratic Movement	263	0.03	0	0
Jamaica Alliance Movement	57	0.01	0	New
Independents	228	0.03	0	0
Total	870,952	100.00	63	+3
Valid votes	870,952	99.39		
Invalid/blank votes	5,358	0.61		
Total votes	876,310	100.00		
Registered voters/turnout	1,648,036	53.17		
Source: Electoral Commission of Jamaica

=== By constituency ===
The results by constituency:

==== Kingston ====
Constituency	Candidates			Eligible Voters	Turnout		Incumbent
Constituency	PNP	JLP	MGPPP	Eligible Voters	Votes	%	Incumbent
Kingston Western	Earl Dawkins 1,828 (16.72%)	Desmond McKenzie 9,073 (82.99%)	Jason Edwards 1,821 (5.7%)	20,205	10,932	54.11%	
Kingston Central	Ronald Thwaites 5,898 (60.53%)	Rosalea Hamilton 3790 (38.90%)	Michael Lorne 56 (0.57%)	19,318	9,744	50.44%	
Kingston East and Port Royal	Phillip Paulwell 8,050 (84.03%)	Peter Sangster 1,530 (15.97%)		21,702	9,580	44.14%	

==== Saint Andrew ====
Constituency	Candidates					Eligible Voters	Turnout		Incumbent
Constituency	PNP	JLP	MGPPP	NDM	Independent	Eligible Voters	Votes	%	Incumbent
Saint Andrew Eastern	Andre Hylton 6,606 (50.80%)	Saphire Longmore 6,352 (48.85%)		Earle Delisser 46 (0.35%)		23,000	13,004	56.54%	
Saint Andrew East Central	Peter Phillips 6,941 (63.08%)	Beverly Prince 4,022 (36.55%)	Allan Martin 41 (0.37%)			26,653	11,004	41.29%	
Saint Andrew East Rural	Damion Crawford 9,638 (50.55%)	Joan Gordon-Webley 9,372 (49.16%)			Damion Crawford 55 (0.29%)	32,864	19,065	58.01%	
Saint Andrew North Central	Leanne Philips 3,901 (38.60%)	Karl Samuda 6,206 (61.40%)				21,048	10,107	48.02%	
Saint Andrew North Eastern	John-Paul White 3,513 (39.27%)	Delroy Chuck 5,383 (60.17%)		Terrence Lindo 50 (0.56%)		17,698	8,946	50.55%	
Saint Andrew North Western	Granville Valentine 5,062 (42.60%)	Derrick Smith 6,771 (56.99%)		Curtis Campbell 49 (0.41%)		26,034	11,882	45.64%	
Saint Andrew Southern	Omar Davies 9,810 (91.94%)	Dennis Messias 860 (8.06%)				20,458	10,670	52.16%	
Saint Andrew South Eastern	Julian Robinson 5,917 (58.09%)	Dwight Nelson 4,230 (41.53%)	Horace Matthews 28 (0.27%)		Byron Patton 11 (0.11%)	19,520	10,186	52.18%	
Saint Andrew South Western	Portia Simpson-Miller 10,973 (94.94%)	Victor Hyde 553 (4.78%)			Annmarie Thomas 32 (0.28%)	22,227	11,558	52.00%	
Saint Andrew Western	Patrick Roberts 6,760 (46.43%)	Andrew Holness 7,799 (53.57%)				26,326	14,559	55.30%	
Saint Andrew West Central	George Hylton 9,379 (68.73%)	George Duhaney 4,229 (30.99%)		Aldith Grant-Lee 39 (0.29%)		30,394	13,647	44.90%	
Saint Andrew West Rural	Paul Buchanan 7,716 (50.64%)	Andrew Gallimore 7,478 (49.08%)		Joan Porteous 43 (0.28%)		32,976	15,237	46.21%	

==== Saint Catherine ====
Constituency	Candidates				Eligible Voters	Turnout		Incumbent
Constituency	PNP	JLP	MGPPP	Independent	Eligible Voters	Votes	%	Incumbent
Saint Catherine Central	Maurice Westney 2,252 (22.55%)	Olivia Grange 7,735 (77.45%)			25,137	9,987	39.73%	
Saint Catherine Eastern	Denise Daley 8,778 (60.55%)	Sharon Hay-Webster 5,719 (39.45%)			27,698	14,497	52.34%	
Saint Catherine East Central	Arnaldo Brown 5,734 (52.56%)	Suzette Buchanan 5,176 (47.44%)			21,436	10,910	50.90%	
Saint Catherine North Central	Natalie Neita-Headley 6,673 (58.89%)	Raymoth Notice 4,622 (40.79%)	Garth Barnett 37 (0.33%)		25142	11,332	45.07%	
Saint Catherine North Eastern	Abe Dabdoub 5,168 (47.18%)	Gregory Mair 5,786 (52.82%)			21,961	10,954	49.88%	
Saint Catherine North Western	Robert Pickersgill 7,682 (62.38%)	Sandra Nesbeth 4,607 (37.41%)		Gene Guthrie 26 (0.21%)	29,706	12,315	41.46%	
Saint Catherine Southern	Fitz Jackson 8,856 (61.34%)	Keith Hinds 5,582 (38.66%)			30,765	14,438	46.93%	
Saint Catherine South Central	Vincent Morrison 3,566 (34.29%)	Andrew Wheatley 6,833 (65.71%)			22,365	10,399	46.50%	
Saint Catherine South Eastern	Colin Fagan 8,236 (55.34%)	Keith Blake 6,588 (44.27%)	Leon Burrell 59 (0.40%)		32,092	14,883	46.38%	
Saint Catherine South Western	Anthony Ewbanks 8,217 (47.28%)	Everald Warmington 9,124 (52.49%)	Upton Blake 40 (0.23%)		32,095	17,381	54.15%	
Saint Catherine West Central	Clinton Clarke 4,547 (41.65%)	Kenneth Baugh 6,371 (58.35%)			24,323	10,918	44.89%	

==== Saint Thomas ====
Constituency	Candidates			Eligible Voters	Turnout		Incumbent
Constituency	PNP	JLP	MGPPP	Eligible Voters	Votes	%	Incumbent
Saint Thomas Eastern	Fenton Ferguson 8,018 (51.39%)	Patrece Charles-Freeman 7,545 (48.36%)	Ian Fleming 39 (0.25%)	28,364	15,602	55.01%	
Saint Thomas Western	Leonard Green 8,652 (49.01%)	James Robertson 8,934 (50.61%)	Robert Cover 66 (0.37%)	34,913	17,652	50.56%	

==== Portland ====
Constituency	Candidates			Eligible Voters	Turnout		Incumbent
Constituency	PNP	JLP	NDM	Eligible Voters	Votes	%	Incumbent
Portland Eastern	Lynvale Bloomfield 9,314 (53.61%)	Patrick Lee 8,061 (46.39%)		31,810	17,375	54.62%	Donald Rhodd
Portland Western	Rohan Quest 6,593 (46.98%)	Daryl Vaz 7,422 (52.89%)	Peter Flemmings 18 (0.13%)	20,896	14,033	67.16%	Daryl Vaz

==== Saint Mary ====
Constituency	Candidates		Eligible Voters	Turnout		Incumbent
Constituency	PNP	JLP	Eligible Voters	Votes	%	Incumbent
Saint Mary Central	Morais Guy 8,585 (59.72%)	Lennon Richards 5,790 (40.28%)	23,908	14,375	60.13%	
Saint Mary South Eastern	Winston Green 7,554 (51.43%)	Richard Creary 7,134 (48.57%)	22,873	14,688	64.22%	
Saint Mary Western	Jolyan Silvera 9,693 (50.59%)	Robert Montague 9,466 (49.41%)	32,305	19,159	59.31%	

==== Saint Ann ====
Constituency	Candidates			Eligible Voters	Turnout		Incumbent
Constituency	PNP	JLP	Ind	Eligible Voters	Votes	%	Incumbent
Saint Ann North Eastern	Paul Stewart 8,253 (46.49%)	Shahine Robinson 9,501 (53.51%)		34,353	17,754	51.68%	
Saint Ann North Western	Dayton Campbell 8,674 (52.55%)	Othneil Lawrence 7,831 (47.45%)		31,248	16,505	52.82%	
Saint Ann South Eastern	Lisa Hanna 8,996 (65.44%)	Oneil Esteen 4,751 (34.56%)		27,029	13,747	50.86%	
Saint Ann South Western	Keith Walford 6,527 (53.00%)	Ernest Smith 5,703 (46.31%)	Andrew Willis 84 (0.68%)	22,828	12,314	53.94%	

==== Trelawny ====
Constituency	Candidates			Eligible Voters	Turnout		Incumbent
Constituency	PNP	JLP	JAM	Eligible Voters	Votes	%	Incumbent
Trelawny Northern	Patrick Atkinson 10,850 (55.72%)	Dennis Meadows 8,567 (43.99%)	Ras-Astor Black 57 (0.29%)	33,029	19,474	58.96%	
Trelawny Southern	Lyndel Frater 4,735 (43.07%)	Marisa Dalrymple-Philibert 6,260 (56.93%)		17,953	10,995	61.24%	

==== Saint James ====
Constituency	Candidates				Eligible Voters	Turnout		Incumbent
Constituency	PNP	JLP	Ind	MGPPP	Eligible Voters	Votes	%	Incumbent
Saint James Central	Lloyd B. Smith 5,677 (50.33%)	Heroy Clarke 5,603 (49.67%)			24,991	11,280	45.14%	
Saint James East Central	Cedric Stewart 6,172 (49.25%)	Edmund Bartlett 6,337 (50.56%)	Roystan Richards 24 (0.19%)		24,826	12,533	50.48%	
Saint James North Western	Henry McCurdy 4977 (45.02%)	Horace Chang 6,077 (54.98%)			24,687	11,054	44.78%	
Saint James Southern	Derrick Kellier 7154 (53.80%)	Homer Davis 6,144 (46.20%)			23,350	13,298	56.95%	
Saint James West Central	Sharon Ffolkes-Abrahams 6,198 (52.73%)	Clive Mullings 5,535 (47.09%)		Clifford Barnett 21 (0.18%)	24,159	11,754	48.65%	

==== Hanover ====
Constituency	Candidates		Eligible Voters	Turnout		Incumbent
Constituency	PNP	JLP	Eligible Voters	Votes	%	Incumbent
Hanover Eastern	D. K. Duncan 6,855 (50.98%)	Paula Kerr-Jarrett 6,591 (49.02%)	21,699	13,446	61.97%	D. K. Duncan
Hanover Western	Ian Hayles 8,583 (55.42%)	Donovan Hamilton 6,905 (44.58%)	27,983	15,488	55.35%	Ian Hayles

==== Clarendon ====
Constituency	Candidates			Eligible Voters	Turnout		Incumbent
Constituency	PNP	JLP	NDM	Eligible Voters	Votes	%	Incumbent
Clarendon Central	Richard Watson 4,121 (36.58%)	Michael Henry 7,146 (63.42%)		26,972	11,267	41.77%	Michael Henry
Clarendon Northern	Horace Dalley 7,663 (56.18%)	Laurence Broderick 5,958 (43.68%)	Eton Williams 20 (0.15%)	21,204	13,641	64.33%	Laurence Broderick
Clarendon North Central	Colin Campbell 4,391 (41.75%)	Pearnel Charles 6,127 (58.25%)		20,632	10,518	50.98%	Pearnel Charles
Clarendon North Western	Richard Azan 8,209 (52.90%)	Michael Stern 7,310 (47.10%)		24,495	15,519	63.36%	Richard Azan
Clarendon South Eastern	Dereck Lambert 8,736 (49.70%)	Rudyard Spencer 8,843 (50.30%)		35,097	17,579	50.09%	Rudyard Spencer
Clarendon South Western	Noel Arscott 7,711 (58.13%)	Joel Williams 5,555 (41.87%)		24,244	13,266	54.72%	Noel Arscott

==== Manchester ====
Constituency	Candidates		Eligible Voters	Turnout		Incumbent
Constituency	PNP	JLP	Eligible Voters	Votes	%	Incumbent
Manchester Central	Peter Bunting 10,606 (51.30%)	Danville Walker 10,067 (48.70%)	33,572	20,673	61.58%	Peter Bunting
Manchester North Eastern	Valenton Wint 7,789 (48.22%)	Audley Shaw 8,363 (51.78%)	25,794	16,152	62.62%	Audley Shaw
Manchester North Western	Mikael Phillips 8,384 (56.54%)	Timothy Scarlett 6,445 (43.46%)	24,422	14,829	60.72%	
Manchester Southern	Michael Peart 9,563 (57.58%)	Collin Virgo 7,044 (42.42%)	28,499	16,607	58.27%	Michael Peart

==== Saint Elizabeth ====
Constituency	Candidates		Eligible Voters	Turnout		Incumbent
Constituency	PNP	JLP	Eligible Voters	Votes	%	Incumbent
Saint Elizabeth North Eastern	Raymond Pryce 9,566 (63.50%)	Corris Samuels 5,498 (36.50%)	28,919	15,064	52.09%	
Saint Elizabeth North Western	Richard Rowe 7,789 (48.22%)	William Hutchinson 5,689 (54.12%)	20,260	10,512	51.89%	
Saint Elizabeth South Eastern	Richard Parchment 9,907 (52.60%)	Franklyn Witter 8,927 (47.40%)	27,617	18,834	68.20%	
Saint Elizabeth South Western	Hugh Buchanan 9,453 (50.03%)	Christopher Tufton 9,440 (49.97%)	27,710	18,893	68.18%	

==== Westmoreland ====
Constituency	Candidates		Eligible Voters	Turnout		Incumbent
Constituency	PNP	JLP	Eligible Voters	Votes	%	Incumbent
Westmoreland Central	Roger Clarke 11,564 (57.57%)	Marlene Malahoo Forte 8,522 (42.43%)	37,543	20,086	53.50%	
Westmoreland Eastern	Luther Buchanan 8,066 (72.43%)	Donovan Foote 3,071 (27.57%)	24,830	11,137	44.85%	
Westmoreland Western	Wykeham McNeill 8,919 (62.81%)	Carey Wallace 5,281 (37.19%)	29,879	14,200	47.53%	
