= Jamaican parliamentary by-elections =

A parliamentary by-election occurs in Jamaica following a vacancy arising in the Parliament of Jamaica. They are often seen as a test of the rival political parties' fortunes between general elections.

== List ==
=== 2020 ===
Pearnel Patroe Charles Jr. won the by-election, unopposed by other political parties, in Clarendon South Eastern.

=== 2019 ===
Ann-Marie Vaz won the by-election in Portland Eastern triggered by the assassination of Lynvale Bloomfield.

=== 2018 ===
Nigel Clarke won the by-election in Saint Andrew North Western.

=== 2017 ===
Following the passing of the sitting MP, Winston Green on 17 August 2017, Norman Alexander Dunn was the Jamaica Labour Party candidate in the hotly contested by-election which took place on 31 October 2017. Dunn was declared winner of the seat- defeating Shane Alexis of the People's National Party. Dunn received 8,176 votes to defeat Alexis, who polled 7,239 votes. The win for the JLP in St. Mary increased their margin in the House of Representatives.

=== 2014 ===
Dwayne Vaz was elected in Westmoreland Central.

=== 2006 ===
Luther Buchanan was elected in Westmoreland Eastern.

=== 2001 ===
Shahine Robinson was elected in Saint Ann North Eastern.
