= List of political parties in Jamaica =

Jamaica has two traditional parties from the old colonial era: the Jamaica Labour Party (JLP) and the People's National Party (PNP). The United Independents' Congress of Jamaica (UIC) became the first new (post colonial) registered political party on December 7, 2019. Other parties have cropped up and disintegrated in the past due mostly to a lack of funding and effective differentiation from the major parties. Since 2018, political parties are now required to be registered by the ECJ or Electoral Commission of Jamaica. This has eliminated all the other minor parties that have not been able to meet registration requirements.

== Registered parties ==
Name	Abbr.	Ideology	Senate	MPs
Jamaica Labour Party	JLP	Nationalism; Conservatism	13 / 21	35 / 63
People's National Party	PNP	Social democracy Democratic socialism	8 / 21	28 / 63
Jamaica Progressive Party	JPP	Social democracy Left-wing populism	0 / 21	0 / 63
United Independents' Congress of Jamaica	UIC	Libertarianism	0 / 21	0 / 63

== Unregistered parties ==
Name	Abbr.	Ideology	Senate	MPs
Revolutionary Conservative Movement	RKM	Right-wing populism	0 / 21	0 / 63
National Democratic Movement	NDM	Conservatism	0 / 21	0 / 63
New Nation Coalition	NNC	Nationalism; Social democracy	0 / 21	0 / 63
Left Alliance for National Democracy and Socialism	LANDS	Socialism; Progressivism	0 / 21	0 / 63
Marcus Garvey People's Political Party	PPP	Socialism; Pan-Africanism	0 / 21	0 / 63

== Defunct parties ==
- Agricultural Industrial Party
- Christian Conscience Movement
- Christian Democratic Party
- Coloured Party – founded in the 1820s to campaign for full civil rights.
- Communist Party of Jamaica
- Convention Independent Party
- Farmers' Federation
- Farmers' Party
- Federation of Citizen's Association
- Imperial Ethiopian World Federation Incorporated Political Party
- Independent Labour Party
- Jamaica Alliance for National Unity
- Jamaica Democratic Party
- Jamaica Independent Movement
- Jamaica Liberal Party
- Jamaica Radical Workers Union
- Jamaica Socialist Party
- Jamaica United Front
- Jamaica United Party – formerly the United West Indian Party
- Jamaica We Party
- Jerusalem Bread Foundation
- National Labour Party
- New Jamaica Alliance
- People's Freedom Movement
- People's Political Party – Jamaica's first party, founded by Marcus Mosiah Garvey in 1929.
- Progressive Labour Movement – merged with the People's Political Party soon after being founded in 1961.
- Republican Party
- United Party of Jamaica
- United People's Party
- Workers Party of Jamaica – defunct Marxist party

== See also ==
- Politics of Jamaica
- Elections in Jamaica
