= 2019 Portland Eastern by-election =

Election result for Portland Eastern, Jamaica

A by-election to the House of Representatives was held for the Portland Eastern constituency on April 4, 2019. The seat was declared vacant due to the murder of member of Parliament Dr. Lynvale Bloomfield on February 2, 2019. The election was won by Ann-Marie Vaz of the Jamaica Labour Party.

== Background ==
On March 1, 2019, Prime Minister Andrew Holness announced that the by-election for the Portland Eastern parliamentary seat would be contested on March 25 with nomination day scheduled for March 8. However, due to the Ash Wednesday public holiday falling that year on March 6, it did not allow for the five clear days between the announcement of the by-election and Nomination day as stipulated under the Representation of the People's Act. On March 4, 2019, the Prime Minister announced that Nomination day would be on March 15, 2019, with the election date set for April 4, 2019.

== Dates ==
Date	Event
February 2, 2019	Member of Parliament Lvnvale Bloomfield dies under tragic circumstances.
March 5, 2019	Writ of Election issued by Governor-General and announced by Prime Minister
March 15, 2019	Nomination day
April 14, 2019	Polling day

== Result ==
2019 Portland Eastern by-election
Party	Candidate	Votes	%	±%
JLP	Ann-Marie Vaz	9,989	50.6	
PNP	Damion Crawford	9,670	49.0	
Rejected ballots		75	0.4	
Turnout		19,734	18.7	
Registered electors		36,315		
JLP gain from PNP				

Voting results
Jamaica Labour Party	50.62%
People's National Party	49.00%
Rejected ballots	0.38%

== See also ==
- Politics of Jamaica
- Elections in Jamaica
