= Saint James Southern =

Parliamentary constituency of Jamaica

Saint James Southern is a parliamentary constituency represented in the House of Representatives of the Jamaican Parliament. It elects one Member of Parliament by the first past the post system of election. The constituency was first contested in the 1976 general election. The former MP was Homer Davis of the Jamaica Labour Party who has been in office since 2020. Since the 2025 Jamaican General Election, the current MP is Nekeisha Burchell of the People's National Party

== Boundaries ==
The constituency covers the Cambridge, Catadupa, Maroon Town, and Welcome Hall electoral divisions in St. James.

== Members of Parliament ==
| Election | Member | Party |
|---|---|---|
| 1976 | Upton Robotham | People's National Party |
| 1980 | Marco Brown | Jamaica Labour Party |
| 1983 | Marco Brown | Jamaica Labour Party |
| 1989 | Derrick Kellier | People's National Party |
| 1993 | Derrick Kellier | People's National Party |
| 1997 | Derrick Kellier | People's National Party |
| 2002 | Derrick Kellier | People's National Party |
| 2007 | Derrick Kellier | People's National Party |
| 2011 | Derrick Kellier | People's National Party |
| 2016 | Derrick Kellier | People's National Party |
| 2020 | Homer Davis | Jamaica Labour Party |
| 2025 | Nekeisha Burchell | People's National Party |

== Elections ==
=== Elections from 2000 to Present ===
General Election 2020: Saint James Southern
| Party | Candidate | Votes | % | ±% |
|---|---|---|---|---|
| JLP | Homer Davis | 7,223 | 57.8 | ▲8.5 |
| PNP | Walton Small | 5,275 | 42.2 | ▼7.6 |
| Turnout | | 12,498 | | |
| Registered electors | | | | |
| JLP gain from PNP | | | | |

General Election 2016: Saint James Southern
| Party | Candidate | Votes | % | ±% |
|---|---|---|---|---|
| PNP | Derrick Kellier | 6,278 | 49.8 | ▼3.8 |
| JLP | Homer Davis | 6,216 | 49.3 | ▲3.6 |
| NDM | Astor Black | 43 | 0.3 | |
| MGPPP | Joseph Hilton | 34 | 0.3 | |
| Turnout | | 12,604 | 48.5 | ▼8.9 |
| Registered electors | | 26.000 | | ▲11.4 |
| PNP hold | | | | |

General Election 2011: Saint James Southern
| Party | Candidate | Votes | % | ±% |
|---|---|---|---|---|
| PNP | Derrick Kellier | 7,197 | 53.6 | |
| JLP | Homer Davis | 6,125 | 45.7 | |
| Turnout | | 13,400 | 57.4 | |
| Registered electors | | 23,350 | | |
| PNP hold | | | | |

== See also ==
- Politics of Jamaica
- Elections in Jamaica
