= Vaz (surname) =

Vaz is a Portuguese language surname.

It may refer to:

- Ann-Marie Vaz (born 1966), Jamaican politician
- Armindo Vaz d'Almeida, former Prime Minister of São Tomé and Príncipe
- Camillo Vaz (born 1975), French football manager
- Carlos Vaz Ferreira, Uruguayan philosopher
- Carta de Pero Vaz de Caminha, Brazilian diarist
- Claudio Ibrahim Vaz Leal, Brazilian footballer
- Damião Vaz d'Almeida, former Prime Minister of São Tomé and Príncipe
- Daryl Vaz, Jamaican politician
- Douglas Vaz (died 2019), Jamaican politician
- Dwayne Vaz, Jamaican politician
- Gail Vaz-Oxlade, Canadian writer and TV personality
- Herkley Vaz, Jamaican footballer
- João Vaz Corte-Real, Portuguese explorer
- João Vaz, Portuguese painter
- José Mário Vaz, former President of Guinea-Bissau
- Joseph Vaz, 17th century Sri Lankan missionary
- Keith Vaz, British politician and former Labour MP
- Luís Vaz de Camões, Portuguese poet
- Luís Vaz Pereira Pinto Guedes, Portuguese military commander
- María Eugenia Vaz Ferreira, Uruguayan teacher and poet
- Pero Vaz de Caminha, 15th century Portuguese knight
- Ricardo Vaz Tê, Portuguese footballer
- Tristão Vaz Teixeira, Portuguese navigator and explorer
- Valdomiro Vaz Franco, Brazilian footballer
- Valerie Vaz, British politician and Labour MP
- Zeferino Vaz, Brazilian educator
- Lançados (Portuguese Africans) settlers:
- Bibiana Vaz, seventeenth century slave-trader from Cacheu, Guinea-Bissau.
