= 2018 Saint Andrew North Western by-election =

Election result for Saint Andrew North Western, Jamaica

A by-election to the House of Representatives was held for the Saint Andrew North Western constituency on March 5, 2018. The seat was declared vacant after the resignation of Derrick Smith as member of Parliament effective January 15, 2018. The election was won by Nigel Clarke of the Jamaica Labour Party.

== Background ==
The incumbent Derrick Smith was first elected to Parliament from the Saint Andrew North Western constituency during the 1989 general election, representing the Jamaica Labour Party (JLP). He lost the seat in the next 1993 general election to Jepthah Ford of the People's National Party (PNP). However, Smith regained the seat in the subsequent 1997 general election, holding it until his retirement from active politics on January 15, 2018. On February 4, 2018, Prime Minister Andrew Holness declared the seat vacant and announced the date of the by-election as March 5, 2018 with Nomination day set for February 12, 2018. The by-election was contested by Nigel Clarke of the JLP and Keisha Hayle of the PNP. Clarke won 60.7% of the vote, compared with the 38.3% garnered by Hayle, with 1% of ballots rejected. Only 24.3% of eligible voters cast their vote, down from 40.9% in the 2016 election.

== Dates ==
| Date | Event |
|---|---|
| January 15, 2018 | Derrick Smith resigns as member of Parliament |
| February 4, 2018 | Writ of Election issued by Governor-General and announced by Prime Minister |
| February 12, 2018 | Nomination day |
| March 5, 2018 | Polling day |

== Result ==
2018 Saint Andrew North Western by-election
| Party | Candidate | Votes | % | ±% |
|---|---|---|---|---|
| JLP | Nigel Clarke | 4,457 | 60.7 | |
| PNP | Keisha Hayle | 2,809 | 38.3 | |
| Rejected ballots | | 71 | 1.0 | |
| Turnout | | 7,337 | 24.3 | |
| Registered electors | | 30,216 | | |
| JLP hold | | | | |

Voting results
| Jamaica Labour Party | 60.75% |
| People's National Party | 38.29% |
| Rejected ballots | 0.97% |

== See also ==
- Politics of Jamaica
- Elections in Jamaica
