= List of Jamaican ministers of state =

== List of state ministers ==
=== JLP administration, 2020 ===
- Hon. Alando Terrelonge - Ministry of Culture, Gender, Entertainment and Sports
- Hon. Homer Davis - Ministry of Local Government and Rural Development
- Hon. J.C. Hutchinson - Ministry of Transport and Mining
- Hon. Juliet Cuthbert-Flynn - Ministry of Health and Wellness
- Sen, the Hon. Leslie Campbell - Ministry of Foreign Affairs and Foreign Trade
- Hon. Marsha Smith - Ministry of Finance and the Public Service
- Hon, Dr. Norman Dunn - Ministry of Industry, Investment and Commerce
- Hon. Robert Morgan - Ministry of Education, Youth and Information
- Hon. Zavia Mayne - Ministry of Labour and Social Security

=== JLP administration, 2016 ===
- Hon. Rudyard Spencer - Ministry of Finance and the Public Service
- Hon. Fayval Williams – Ministry of Finance and the Public Service
- Hon. Floyd Green - Ministry of Education, Youth and Information
- Hon. Pearnel Patroe Charles Jr. - Ministry of Foreign Affairs and Foreign Trade
- Hon. Clifford Everald Warmington - Ministry of Economic Growth and Job Creation, Office of the Prime Minister

=== PNP administration, 2011 ===
- Hon. Arnaldo Brown – Ministry of Foreign Affairs & Foreign Trade
- Hon. Sharon Ffolkes Abrahams - Ministry of Industry, Investment and Commerce
- Hon. Ian Hayles – Ministry of Agriculture & Fisheries
- Hon. Colin Fagan - Ministry of Local Government and Community Development
- Hon. Richard Azan - Ministry of Transport, Works & Housing
- Hon. Damion Crawford - Ministry of Tourism & Entertainment
- Hon. Julian Robinson - Ministry of Mining, Energy & ICT
- Hon. Luther Buchanan - Office of the Prime Minister

=== JLP administration, 2007 ===
- Hon. Robert Montague – Office of the Prime Minister (OPM) (local government reform)
- Hon. Daryl Vaz – OPM (project implementation and service delivery) recently information
- Hon. Shahine Robinson – OPM (civic responsibilities)
- Hon. Andrew Gallimore – Ministry of Labour and Social Security
- Hon. Joseph Hibbert – Ministry of Transport and Works
- Hon. Clifford Everald Warmington – Ministry of Water and Housing
- Hon. Michael Stern – Ministry of Industry, Investment and Commerce
- Hon. William J.C. Hutchinson – Ministry of Agriculture and Fisheries
- Hon. Laurence Broderick – Ministry of Mining and Energy
- Senator Arthur Williams – Ministry of Finance and Public Service
- Senator Marlene Malahoo Forte – Ministry of Foreign Affairs and Foreign Trade
- Hon Dr. St. Aubyn Bartlett - Ministry of National Security

== See also ==
- Politics of Jamaica
- Cabinet of Jamaica

== Sources ==
- All About Jamaica
- "Ministers of State & Parliamentary Secretaries", Jamaica Information Services
- "Junior Ministers and Parliamentary Secretaries Sworn-in – Jamaica Information Service".
