= Matthew Samuda =

Jamaican politician

Senator The Honourable Matthew Samuda MP
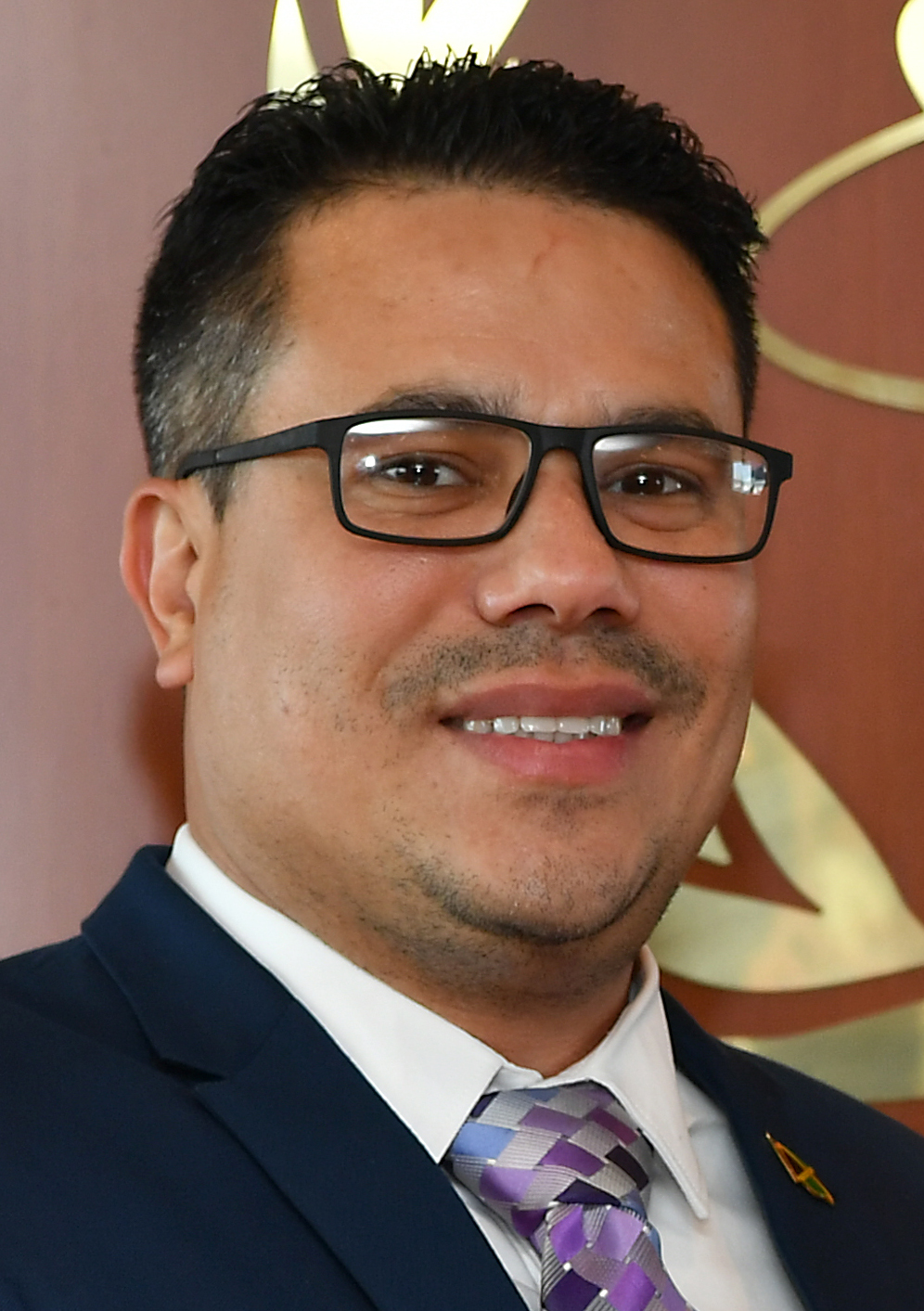

Minister of Water, Environment, and Housing
- Incumbent
- Assumed office 11 January 2022

MP for Saint Ann North Eastern
- Incumbent
- Assumed office September 2024
- Preceded by: Marsha Smith

Personal details
- Born: August 28, 1984 (age 42) London, United Kingdom
- Spouse: Natalie Chin
- Children: 1
- Education: Campion College; University of the West Indies (BMS)

Matthew Peter Samuda (born August 29, 1984) is a Jamaican politician from the Jamaica Labour Party. He is a member of the Lower House (Houses of Representatives Jamaica) and Minister without portfolio in the Ministry of Economic Growth and Job Creation in the Cabinet of Jamaica.

In September 2024, he replaced Marsha Smith as the constituency chairman in Saint Ann North Eastern after winning a by-election.

Samuda was re-elected in the 2025 Jamaican general election.
