= Derrick Kellier =

Jamaican businessman and politician

Derrick Flavius Leroy Kellier CD

Minister of Agriculture and Fisheries
- In office 2014–2016
- Monarch: Elizabeth II
- Governor General: Sir Patrick Allen
- Prime Minister: Portia Simpson-Miller
- Preceded by: Roger Clarke
- Succeeded by: Karl Samuda

Minister of Labour and Social Security
- In office 2012–2015
- Monarch: Elizabeth II
- Governor General: Sir Patrick Allen
- Prime Minister: Portia Simpson-Miller
- Preceded by: Pearnel Charles
- Succeeded by: Fenton Ferguson

Minister of Labour and Social Security
- In office 2006–2007
- Monarch: Elizabeth II
- Governor General: Sir Kenneth Hall
- Prime Minister: Portia Simpson-Miller
- Preceded by: Horace Dalley
- Succeeded by: Pearnel Charles

Member of Parliament for Saint James Southern
- In office 1989–2016

Personal details
- Born: 27 May 1947 (age 78) Saint James Parish, Colony of Jamaica, British Empire
- Party: People's National Party
- Spouse: Claudia Kellier (née Nelson) (m. 1981)
- Children: 5 daughters
- Awards: Order of Distinction (2009)

Derrick Flavius Leroy Kellier CD (born 27 May 1947) is a Jamaican businessman and politician, representing the People's National Party (PNP). He was Member of Parliament (MP) for the constituency of Saint James Southern from 1989 to 2020. He served as Minister of Labour and Social Security from 2006 to 2007, and again from 2012 to 2015. Kellier also served concurrently as Minister of Agriculture and Fisheries from 2014 to 2016.

== Early life and education ==
Kellier was born on 27 May 1947 in Welcome Hall, St James. He was educated at Roehampton Primary School in St James and at Calabar High School in St Andrew.

== Political career ==
In 1978, Kellier was elected National Chairman of the People’s National Party Youth Organisation (PNPYO). He was first elected to the House of Representatives from the Saint James Southern constituency in the 1989 general election, polling 7,980 votes to 3,852 for Ephraim Morgan of the Jamaica Labour Party (JLP), and 452 for Princess Vernon (Independent). He went on to win the constituency for the PNP in the 1993, 1997, 2002, 2007, 2011, and 2016 general elections. From 1989 to 1995, Kellier served as Parliamentary Secretary in the Office of the Prime Minister and in the Ministry of Education and Culture. He then served as Minister of State in the Office of the Prime Minister and from October 2002 in the Ministry of National Security. When Portia Simpson Miller became Prime Minister on 30 March 2006, she appointed Kellier to her cabinet a day later as Minister of Labour and Social Security. He remained in office until the PNP went into opposition after its election defeat in September 2007. After the PNP won the 29 December, 2011 general elections and returned to power, Prime Minister Simpson-Miller reappointed Kellier as Minister of Labour and Social Security. He was sworn in as minister on 6 January 2012. Since October 2014, he has also assumed the portfolio of Minister of Agriculture and Fisheries after Roger Clarke, the sitting minister, died in office. He was succeeded as Minister of Labour and Social Security by Fenton Ferguson on 9 November 2015. In 2018, Kellier announced his intention to retire from representational politics after the next general election. He did not contest the 2020 general election, and was succeeded as MP by Homer Davis of the JLP.

== Honors and awards ==
Kellier was awarded the Order of Distinction, Commander Class in 2009.

== Personal life ==
Kellier married Claudia Kellier (née Nelson) on 1 December 1981. He is the father of 5 daughters.

== See also ==
- Ministry of Labour and Social Security (Jamaica)
- Ministry of Agriculture and Fisheries (Jamaica)

Political offices
Preceded by Horace Dalley	Minister of Labour and Social Security; 2006 – 2007	Succeeded by Pearnel Charles
Preceded by Pearnel Charles	Minister of Labour and Social Security; 2012 – 2015	Succeeded by Fenton Ferguson
Preceded by Roger Clarke	Minister of Agriculture and Fisheries; 2014 – 2016	Succeeded by Karl Samuda
