= Portland Western =

Jamaican parliamentary constituency

Portland West is a parliamentary constituency represented in the House of Representatives of the Jamaican Parliament. It elects one Member of Parliament MP by the first past the post system of election. The constituency consists of the western part of Portland Parish. It is represented by Labour MP Daryl Vaz. Vaz's wife Ann-Marie Vaz was MP for Portland Eastern.
