= Duane Smith =

Jamaican politician

MP for Saint Andrew North Western
- Incumbent
- Assumed office 2024
- Preceded by: Nigel A. L. Clarke

Personal details
- Party: Jamaica Labour Party

Duane Smith is a Jamaican politician from the Jamaica Labour Party who has been MP for Saint Andrew North Western since a 2024 by-election.

He was re-elected in the 2025 general election. His father Derrick C. Smith served as MP for the same constituency.
