= Michael Stern (Jamaican politician) =

Jamaican politician

Michael Anthony Stern is a Jamaican politician with the Jamaica Labour Party. He was formerly a Member of the Parliament of Jamaica for Clarendon North West as well as State Minister of Industry, Investment and Commerce, but lost his seat in the 2011 general election.

== Career ==
Stern beat People's National Party incumbent Richard Azan by 933 votes to take the Clarendon North West seat in the 2007 general election. Bruce Golding then named him as State Minister of Industry, Investment and Commerce.

In July 2009, Justice Lloyd Hibbert of the High Court ordered Stern to vacate his seat after finding that he had held dual citizenship in Jamaica and the United States at the time of the 2007 election.

Azan's application for the court to hand the seat to him in Stern's place failed, and instead the court ordered that a by-election be held. By then, Stern had renounced his citizenship, so he was constitutionally eligible to run. In the by-election, the PNP held to an earlier pact not to run a candidate, since some of their MPs also had citizenship issues of their own and might face similar by-elections; Azan for his part stated that he chose not to run because "the country is going through too much difficulties right now". Accordingly Stern only faced off against National Democratic Movement candidate Eaton Williams, whom he defeated handily by 5,572 to 381 votes.

In November, a few months after being returned to his seat, Stern was appointed back to his old State Minister of Industry, Investment and Commerce job by Golding. Among other activities in that position, he called on the Jamaican diaspora to aid in building "Brand Jamaica". In the 2011 general election, Stern faced off against Azan again; however, he netted only 7,143 votes against Azan's 8,342.
