= Minister of State =

Junior minister assigned to assist a specific cabinet minister

Minister of state is a designation for a government minister, with varying meanings in different jurisdictions. In a number of European countries, the title is given as an honorific conferring a higher rank, often bestowed upon senior ministers. Conversely, in the United Kingdom and several other Commonwealth countries, "minister of state" is a junior rank, subordinate to a minister of higher rank. Finally, in other countries such as Australia, Brazil and Japan, all government ministers hold the title of "minister of state".

== High government ranks ==
In several national traditions, the title "Minister of State" is reserved for government members of cabinet rank, often a formal distinction within it, or even its chief.

- Brazil: Minister of State (Portuguese: Ministro de Estado) is the title borne by all members of the Federal Cabinet.
- Chile: Minister of State (Spanish: Ministro de Estado) is the title borne by all heads of the Ministries.
- France: Under the Fifth Republic, Minister of State (Ministre d'État in French) is an honorific title bestowed upon nomination as a Minister. Ministres d'État, in the protocol, rank after the Prime Minister and before the other Ministers but enjoy no other specific prerogatives. Initially, the title of Ministres d'État didn't explicitly include a portfolio (a practice common under previous regimes), although in time both the title and a specific portfolio have since normally been conferred together. As under previous regimes, a series of Ministres d'État in the same cabinet may also reflect a balance between the different political trends in the ruling party (or within the ruling coalition). A Ministre d'État is not to be confused with a Secretary of State (Secrétaire d'État), a Junior minister assisting a Minister and who may only attend cabinet meeting if the topic discussed touches his responsibilities. Former Ministres d'État include former French President Nicolas Sarkozy.
- Japan: Minister of State is the title borne by all members of the Japanese Cabinet.
- Kenya: A Minister of State generically refers to a more senior minister by virtue of the revenue power, or security implications of their ministry. For instance, ministries housed under the Office of the President, Office of the Deputy President and Office of the Prime Minister are titled as "Ministries of State for". Actual examples include Ministry of State for Internal Security and Provincial Administration; Ministry of State for Immigration; and Ministry of State for Public Service.
- Luxembourg: Minister of State (French: Ministre d'État; Luxembourgish and German: Staatsminister) is an additional title borne by the Prime Minister. Unlike the title 'Prime Minister' (French: Premier ministre; Luxembourgish: Premier; German: Premierminister), which was instituted only in 1989, that of Minister of State has been held by the head of government since 1848. As Minister of State, his role is to control and coordinate the activities of the other Ministers.
- Monaco: The Minister of State of Monaco is the Principality's head of government, appointed by and subordinate to the Prince of Monaco and responsible for enforcing its laws.
- Palau: The Minister of State of Palau is the minister responsible for foreign affairs and international trade.
- Portugal: Minister of State (Ministro de Estado) is a member of the Council of Ministers who holds a more distinct position within the cabinet, roughly equivalent to Deputy prime minister.
- Spain: When Adolfo Suárez was Prime Minister, Ministers of State were created who held a more distinct position within the Government. However, this initiative did not last since his successors did not follow this path.
- Scandinavian states + Finland: The equivalent title statsminister is used for the head of government (i.e. the prime minister), and compound titles of which -minister is a part may be used for major-portfolio Ministers. For details on statsminister, see Prime Minister of Sweden, Prime Minister of Denmark, Prime Minister of Norway, and Prime Minister of Finland.
- Turkey: A Minister of State (Turkish: Devlet Bakanı) was a post in Turkish cabinets between 1946 and 2011. It was possible to have more than one Minister of State in a single cabinet, responsible for different policy areas.
- United Kingdom: Normally a mid-level government role (see next section) but Lord Beaverbrook was nominally Minister of State from 1 May 1941 to 29 June 1941 while a member of the war cabinet. It has become regular practice for senior Ministers of State to be invited to attend cabinet on a regular basis at the Prime Minister's discretion, though they are not technically full members. However, more recently, some Ministers of State have been made full members of the Cabinet, such as Jacob Rees-Mogg when he served as Minister of State for Government Efficiency.

== Minor government ranks ==
In various nations, especially in former members of the British Empire, "Minister of State" is a junior ministerial rank, often subordinated to a cabinet member.

- Bangladesh: A Minister of State is a junior minister in the Cabinet of Bangladesh who may assist a cabinet minister or be in charge of an independent ministry. Then the State Minister is known as Minister of State (Ministry Charge).
- Canada: A Minister of State is senior to a Secretary of State but junior to a Minister of the Crown (ordinary portfolio minister).

- Germany: Minister of State (Staatsminister in German) is the title given to a parliamentary state secretary (a member of parliament serving as a political aide to a cabinet minister) serving in the Foreign Office or the Chancellor's Office. Accordingly, Minister of State ranks between a State Secretary and a Federal Minister. It is also used as the title of cabinet ministers of certain German states. Historically, the same title was used (sometimes alternating with other styles), notably as head of government in certain of the many constituent monarchies of pre-reunion Germany, e.g. in Hesse-Darmstadt, Hesse-Kassel (or Hesse-Cassel), Lippe, Schaumburg-Lippe, in Hannover, Mecklenburg-Strelitz, Reuss-Schleiz-Gera and Principality of Reuss-Greiz, Kingdom of Saxony, Saxe-Altenburg, Saxe-Coburg-Gotha, Saxe-Meiningen, Saxe-Weimar-Eisenach, Schwarzburg-Rudolstadt and Schwarzburg-Sondershausen.

- India: A Minister of State is a junior minister in the Council of Ministers in the Union Government who may assist a cabinet minister or have independent charge of a ministry. The Constitution of India restricts the total number of ministers in the Council of Ministers to 15% of total number of members in the House of the People at the Union level. A similar restriction also exists at the State level. A Minister of State with independent charge is a minister without an overseeing Cabinet Minister in the State or Union Government of India. He himself is in charge of his ministry, unlike Minister of State who is also a Minister but assists a cabinet minister. Moreover, such ministers can take part in cabinet meetings on important issues unlike Ministers of state who does not take any part in any cabinet meetings.
- Ireland: A Minister of State is junior to a Minister of a Department of State (portfolio minister) and of similar standing to a Parliamentary Secretary.
- Nigeria: A Minister of State is a junior Minister in the Nigerian Cabinet and is normally the principal deputy or one of the deputies to the Minister in a Federal Ministry. The Minister of State may in some cases be the head of a special department in the President's Office. By law, both senior Ministers and Ministers of State are regarded as Ministers of the Government of the Federation.
- Pakistan: Like in other former British colonies, a Minister of State in Pakistan is a junior Minister in the national Government who may assist a cabinet minister or have independent charge of a ministry.
- Sri Lanka: A Minister of State (or State Minister) is a non-cabinet minister of the executive branch of the Government of Sri Lanka, as such is junior to a Cabinet Minister but senior to a Deputy Minister.
- Singapore: Ministers of State and Senior Ministers of State are members of the executive branch of the Government of Singapore, senior in rank to Parliamentary Secretaries and Senior Parliamentary Secretaries, but junior to full Cabinet Ministers.
- Turkmenistan: The chairperson of the government-owned national natural gas company, Turkmengas, holds the rank of Minister of State, and is included in the Cabinet of Ministers.
- United Kingdom: A Minister of State is a member of His Majesty's Government, medium in rank, junior only to a Secretary of State but senior to a Parliamentary Under-Secretary of State and Parliamentary Private Secretaries (PPSs). Ministers of State are responsible to their Secretaries of State. The role in this context has existed only since 1945 (see above for exception in the case of Beaverbrook) – previously, each parliamentary under-secretary was directly beneath a secretary of state. There can be more than one Minister of State at any government Department. Ministers of State may have departmental PPSs, or a PPS might be assigned to them. Of a similar standing to Ministers of State are positions such as the Solicitor General, the Deputy Leader of the House of Commons, Treasurer of the Household, Captain of the Yeomen of the Guard, Paymaster General, Financial Secretary to the Treasury and Economic Secretary to the Treasury. Ministers of State are bound by the Ministerial Code.

== Subnational office ==
In the republic of Burma, the title was used for the Chief ministers of the following autonomous states, from 1947/48 till the abolition of that autonomy in 1962: Arakan State (Rakhine), Chin State, Kayin State (Kayin), Kayah State (Karenni), Kachin State and Shan State

== Other uses ==
=== Australia ===
- Australia: Section 64 of the Commonwealth constitution empowers the Governor-General to appoint "the Queen's Ministers of State for the Commonwealth [of Australia]" as "officers to administer such departments of State of the Commonwealth as the Governor‑General in Council may establish". The Ministers of State Act 1952 defines the number of ministers only distinguishes between ministers and parliamentary secretaries (now known as assistant ministers). However, in practice ministers of state are divided into the Cabinet and the outer ministry. The only ministerial portfolio to have the term "minister of state" in the title is Special Minister of State.

=== Netherlands and Belgium ===
In the Netherlands (Minister van Staat in Dutch) and Belgium (also Ministre d'État in French), Ministers of State is a title of honour awarded formally by the Monarch, but on the initiative of the government. It is given on a personal basis, for life rather than for a specified period. The title is granted for exceptional merits, generally to senior politicians at the end of their party career. Ministers of state are often former cabinet members or party leaders. Ministers of State advise the Sovereign in delicate situations, with moral authority but without formal competence.

In Belgium they are entitled to a seat, alongside the members of the government in power, in the Crown Council; to date the Crown Council has been convened on only five occasions, the first being in 1870 for the Franco-Prussian War, and the latest in 1960 in connection with the independence of the Belgian Congo. Apart from that, the only privileges of being a "minister of state" are precedence according to protocol on state occasions and a ministerial car registration number. De facto, appointments tend to respect the almost obsessional balances between the Flemish and French-speaking communities as well as between the 'ministeriable' political families: mainly Christian-democrats, Socialists, Liberals, also (moderate) Nationalists, occasionally an Ecologist). Other former careers include those of Étienne Davignon (European Commissioner) and Luc Coene (prime-ministerial Kabinetschef, roughly Chief of staff). In January 2006 the number of ministers of state reached 51 with Johan Vande Lanotte, shortly after he laid down his portfolio and title of Vice-Prime Minister to head the Flemish Socialist SP.A party. After formateur Yves Leterme returned his commission in August 2007, King Albert II consulted 13 Ministers of State individually, without convening the crown council as such.

In both countries, junior ministers are called State Secretary (staatssecretaris or secrétaire d'état), similarly to France. Some State Secretaries may, in specific circumstances, style themselves as Minister (not Minister of State) when visiting a foreign country.

=== New Zealand ===
- To bestow a sinecure – the role has been given to senior figures who did not occupy positions of leadership, but who were held in high esteem or who were wanted in Cabinet. For example, a former Prime Minister might be appointed Minister of State as an "elder statesman" – this was the purpose for which New Zealand Prime Minister Rob Muldoon originally created the position in 1975.
- To create a sort of junior minister – using this office, politicians can be appointed to associate roles without having a substantive ministerial role of their own. There is no formal rank of "assistant minister" or "deputy minister" in New Zealand, but if someone is a full minister, they can be assigned to an associate role helping a different full minister. Someone appointed Minister of State is technically a full minister and can thus be assigned associate roles, thereby creating a type of minister whose only effective authority is as an associate minister.

The first Minister of State in New Zealand was Keith Holyoake, a former Prime Minister. Other prominent people to have held the office include Jim Bolger and Robin Gray (a former Prime Minister and a former Speaker, respectively). Examples of people who held the office simply in order that they might be appointed as associate ministers include Mita Ririnui, Damien O'Connor, and Dover Samuels.

=== Ancien Régime France ===
In France during the Ancien Régime and Bourbon Restoration, the title "Ministre d'État" had a specific designation. The title first appeared under Louis XIII. The "ministres d'État", appointed by lettres patentes, attended meetings of the Conseil du Roi (King's Council, which would later become the Conseil d'État). From 1661 on – at the start of Louis XIV's "personal reign" – the king called whomever he wished to his Council; invitations were only good for one session and needed to be renewed as long as the individual retained the king's confidence. However, having attended one session of the Council gave the person the right to be called "ministre d'État" for life, and also gave him the right to an annual life pension of roughly 20,000 livres. There were few "ministres d'État" at Council meetings (between three or four during the reign of Louis XIV); they also attended the "Conseil des Dépêches" (the "Council of Messages", concerning notices and administrative reports from the provinces).

Suppressed during the French Revolution, the title "ministre d'État" reappeared during the Bourbon Restoration as essentially an honorary title given (not systematically) to Ministers after their demission or their departure from office; refusal on behalf of the King to award this title to a demissioned Minister was seen as an affront.

=== British diplomacy ===
From 28 January 1944, the last two British Ministers Resident in the Middle East, concerned with former British protectorate Egypt, were styled Ministers of State in the Middle East.

== See also ==
- List of Jamaican ministers of state
- Minister of State (Turkey)
- State Minister (Georgia)
