= Isat Buchanan =

Jamaican politician

Isat Buchanan MP

Member of the Jamaican Parliament for Portland Eastern
- Incumbent
- Assumed office 3 September 2025
- Preceded by: Ann-Marie Vaz

Personal details
- Born: 12 December 1978 (age 47) St Andrew, Jamaica
- Party: People's National Party
- Parents: Big Youth (father); Joan Porteous (mother)
- Education: University of the West Indies, Mona
- Occupation: Attorney-at-law

Isat Aquaba Buchanan (born 12 December 1978) is a Jamaican politician and attorney-at-law who has served as the Member of Parliament for Portland Eastern, representing the People's National Party (PNP), since the 2025 general election.

== Early life ==
Buchanan is a son of Manley Augustus Buchanan, better known as Big Youth, a notable Jamaican deejay, and Joan Porteous, a businesswoman. He attended Meadowbrook High School.

In 1997, Buchanan was convicted in Half Way Tree Resident Magistrates' Court for possession of cocaine, dealing in cocaine, and taking steps to export cocaine. He was sentenced to 21 days' imprisonment and required to pay a $1 million Jamaican dollar fine. He later told The Gleaner that he had been arrested at Norman Manley International Airport in 1996 by the Jamaica Constabulary Force, having been found in possession of drugs which he thought was cash, which he had been given by someone else to deliver to the United States. His Jamaican conviction was expunged from his record in 2014.

In 2000, he was convicted in the United States for conspiracy to import cocaine and sentenced to 10 years' imprisonment. He was released after 8.5 years. He told The Gleaner that he had been arrested in 1999 on a flight to Florida, when drugs were found in possession of a fellow passenger who accused Buchanan of being responsible. His sentence was enhanced by the United States' mandatory minimum sentencing laws, which stipulate a minimum of 10 years' imprisonment for a second felony drug offence, whether the first was committed in the US or abroad.

He explored a musical career under the name Isat, releasing several songs, including "Unbreakable", "Don't Give Up" (featuring Big Youth and Tafari), and "That's Cool" (featuring Big Youth). He described his genre as reggae fusion. He also worked as a real estate agent and personal trainer.

== Legal career ==
Buchanan studied law at the University of the West Indies, Mona (UWI). In 2017, he was issued a practicing certificate by the General Legal Council of Jamaica (GLC). He worked for a period as an adjunct lecturer at UWI. In 2017, he applied to become a Justice of the Peace (JP) in Kingston but was rejected in 2019 for not disclosing his previous convictions. Buchanan sued to overturn the decision but in 2024 a judge ruled against him. In June 2020, Buchanan was retained by Vybz Kartel to represent him on an appeal before the Judicial Committee of the Privy Council (JCPC).

In October 2022, a disciplinary committee of the GLC found Buchanan guilty of professional misconduct over remarks he made in November 2020 about the Director of Public Prosecutions, Paula Llewellyn, accusing her of being "shady". In July 2023, he made further "offensive, profane, vulgar, foul, and obscene" remarks about Llewellyn and Delroy Chuck, the Minister of Justice, on a YouTube show. In November 2023, the GLC suspended him from legal practice for two years, fined him $500,000 Jamaican dollars, and ordered him to pay the Council's legal costs of $20,000 Jamaican dollars. Buchanan appealed the suspension to the Court of Appeal as excessive and was granted a stay in December 2023 which permitted him to continue to represent Vybz Kartel before the JCPC. Buchanan was part of the legal team that saw Kartel's original conviction quashed by the JCPC in March 2024 and then saw his client acquitted by the Jamaican Court of Appeal in July 2024.

== Political career ==
Buchanan was chair of the People's National Party (PNP) Human Rights Commission until July 2023, when he resigned over the comments he made about the Director of Public Prosecutions. In October 2024, Buchanan was selected to represent the PNP in the constituency of Portland Eastern at the impending general election. His selection was criticised by the PNP's rival political party, the Jamaica Labour Party (JLP), who were also the incumbents in the seat. In the general election, which took place on 3 September 2025, Buchanan defeated the JLP incumbent Ann-Marie Vaz by 8,361 votes to 8,176.
