= Hugh Graham (politician) =

Jamaican politician

The Honourable Hugh Graham MP

MP for Saint Catherine North Western
- Incumbent
- Assumed office 2020
- Preceded by: Robert Pickersgill

Personal details
- Citizenship: Jamaican
- Party: People's National Party
- Parent: Libnah Graham (mother)
- Education: Swallowfield All-Age School; Calabar High School
- Occupation: Chemical production
- Committees: Economy and Production

Hugh Graham is a Jamaican politician from the People's National Party.
