= BMS =

BMS may refer to:

== Arts and entertainment ==
- Be-Music Source, a computer file format and Beatmania simulating game system
- Bristol Motor Speedway, Tennessee, US
- Blue Mountain State, a television series
- Bibliography of Music Literature (BMS or BMS online)
- Banco del Mutuo Soccorso, a rock band
- Benchmark Sims, a gaming community who authored the Falcon BMS modification to upgrade the original Falcon 4.0 combat flight simulator

== Corporations and organizations ==
- Bayer MaterialScience, the former name of the materials science company Covestro
- Bemis Company (New York Stock Exchange symbol)
- BBK BMS, a Danish basketball club
- Bharatiya Mazdoor Sangh, a trade union organisation in India
- BMS Scuderia Italia, an Italian racing team
- BMS World Mission, a Christian missionary society
- British Mycological Society, to promote the study of fungi
- Bristol Myers Squibb, a pharmaceutical and health products company
- Boston Microtonal Society, US

=== Education ===
- Bachelor of Management Studies
- Bedford Modern School, a school in Bedford, England
- Berlin Mathematical School, Germany
- B.M.S. College of Engineering, an engineering college in Bangalore, India
- B.M.S. Institute of Technology and Management, an engineering college in Bangalore, India

== Science and technology ==
- Battery management system
- Battlefield management system
- Bridge management system
- Building management system
- Borane dimethylsulfide, a chemical

=== Medical ===
- Bone marrow suppression
- Burning mouth syndrome, also known as glossodynia or stomodynia oral dysaesthesia
- Bare-metal stent, a coronary stent
- Bio-mechanical stimulation, vibration transferred to the human body

== Transportation ==
- Broadmeadows railway station, Melbourne (station code BMS), Australia
- Bromley South railway station (National Rail station code BMS), England
- Socrates Mariani Bittencourt Airport (IATA airport code BMS), Brumado, Bahia, Brazil; see List of airports by IATA airport code: B
- Blue Air (ICAO airline code BMS), a Romanian airline

== Other uses ==
- Bondi–Metzner–Sachs group (or BMS group), an asymptotic symmetry group of General Relativity
- Kanuri language (ISO 639 language code bms)

== See also ==
- BM (disambiguation), for the singular of BMs
- BMSS (disambiguation)
