= Marco Brown =

Jamaican politician (died 2022)

Marco Brown (c. 1927/1928 – 11 August 2022) was a Jamaican politician.

== Biography ==
Brown served as a member of the Parliament of Jamaica for Saint James Southern from 1980 to 1989, representing the Jamaica Labour Party. He also served as Minister of Tourism from 1980 to 1983.

Brown died from COVID-19, at the age of 94.
