= Christopher Brown (Jamaican politician) =

Jamaican politician

MP for Saint Mary South Eastern
- Incumbent
- Assumed office 3 September 2025
- Preceded by: Norman Alexander Dunn

Personal details
- Born: c. August 8, 1973 (age 53)
- Party: People's National Party
- Education: University of the West Indies (PhM)

Christopher Brown (born c. 1973) is a Jamaican politician from the People's National Party who has been MP for Saint Mary South Eastern since 2025. He is the Shadow Minister for Science, Technology and Digital Tranaformation. He has had significant leadership experience in the private sector across Jamaica, Guyana, Suriname and the wider Caribbean holding several Regional Roles.

Brown unseated Norman Alexander Dunn in the 2025 Jamaican general election by 11 votes. He is a business executive by profession.
