= Lothan Cousins =

Jamaican politician

Lothan Cousins MP

MP for Clarendon South Western
- Incumbent
- Assumed office 3 September 2020
- Preceded by: Noel Arscott

Personal details
- Party: People's National Party

Lothan Cousins is a Jamaican People's National Party politician who has been Member of Parliament for Clarendon South Western since 2020. He attended the University of the West Indies.
