= Ernie Smith (politician) =

Jamaican politician (1951–2021)

MP for Saint Ann South Western
- In office 2002–2011
- Preceded by: unknown
- Succeeded by: unknown

Personal details
- Party: Jamaica Labour Party

Ernest A. Smith, known as Ernie Smith, (1951–18 August 2021) was a Jamaican Labour Party politician.

== Personal life ==
His daughter Marsha Smith was elected in Saint Ann North Eastern in 2020. He survived a near fatal car crash in early 2021 and died from cancer at University Hospital of the West Indies in August 2021.
