= 1959 Jamaican general election =

1959 Jamaica general election
- 28 July 1959
- All 45 seats in the House of Representatives; 23 seats needed for a majority
- Turnout: 66.09% (▲0.98pp)
Party	Leader	Vote %	Seats	+/–
PNP	Norman Manley	54.79	29	+11
JLP	Alexander Bustamante	44.31	16	+2
This lists parties that won seats. See the complete results below.
Chief minister before	Chief minister after
Norman Manley; PNP	Norman Manley; PNP

General elections were held in Jamaica on 28 July 1959. The result was a victory for the People's National Party, which won 29 of the 45 seats. Voter turnout was 66%.

== Results ==
Party	Votes	%	Seats	+/–
People's National Party	305,642	54.79	29	+11
Jamaica Labour Party	247,149	44.31	16	+2
Independent Labour Party	4,595	0.82	0	New
Convention Independent Party	196	0.04	0	New
Jamaica Independent Movement	115	0.02	0	New
Independents	97	0.02	0	0
Total	557,794	100.00	45	+13
Valid votes	557,794	98.89		
Invalid/blank votes	6,277	1.11		
Total votes	564,071	100.00		
Registered voters/turnout	853,539	66.09		
Source: Emmanuel
