= New Nation Coalition =

Jamaican political party

The New Nation Coalition (NNC) is a small nationalist and social democratic political party in Jamaica, led by Betty-Ann Blaine. The party has yet to contest a general election, but party convenor Betty-Ann Blaine was fielded as a candidate in the 4 April 2011, St. Catherine South Western by-election. She was unsuccessful in her bid to win the seat, securing only 175 votes, or 1.89% of votes cast.

The New Nation Coalition formed a partnership with the National Democratic Movement known as the National Coalition in 2011. The NNC chose to boycott the 29 December 2011 general election due to its objection to the election being called during the Christmas holiday season . The party called for the public to also boycott the election and said that these elections should be delayed in order for more information on scandals affecting both the then-governing Jamaica Labour Party and the then-opposition People's National Party to be released to the public.
