= Marsha Smith =

Jamaican politician

The Honourable Marsha Smith

MP for Saint Ann North Eastern
- In office 7 September 2020 – 3 September 2024
- Governor-General: Sir Patrick Allen
- Prime Minister: Andrew Holness
- Preceded by: Shahine Robinson
- Succeeded by: Matthew Samuda

Minister of State in the Ministry of Education
- In office 22 May 2023 - present

Personal details
- Party: Jamaica Labour Party
- Education: Westwood High School, Jamaica
- Alma mater: University of the West Indies, Norman Manley Law School

Marsha Leonette Smith is a Jamaican attorney-at-law and Labour Party politician, and former Member of Parliament for Saint Ann North Eastern (2020-24). She currently serves as the State Minister in the Ministry of Education.

== Political career ==
Smith was elected in the 2020 general election.

In February 2022, a number of her constituents protested calling for her resignation citing her perceived lack of presence and involvement in the community.

Smith tendered her resignation as Member of Parliament for Saint Ann North Eastern in September 2024. Smith was replaced as the constituency chairman by Senator Matthew Samuda earlier in the year.

Her father Ernie Smith represented Saint Ann South Western from 2002 to 2011.
