= Nekeisha Burchell =

Jamaican politician

Member of Parliament for Saint James Southern
- Incumbent
- Assumed office 3 September 2025
- Preceded by: Homer Davis

Personal details
- Party: People's National Party

Nekeisha Burchell is a Jamaican politician from the People's National Party who has been MP for Saint James Southern since 2025.

== Education ==
Burchell grew up in the parish of St James, Jamaica. She attended Garlands Primary School in the community of the same name, and Mount Alvernia High School in Montego Bay.

Burchell completed a bachelor's degree in international relations and political science at the University of the West Indies, and a master's degree in strategic communication from the London School of Economics.

== Political career ==
Burchell joined the secretariat of the People's National Party (PNP) in 2009, working as an assistant to Peter Bunting. She later became deputy general secretary of the PNP and its director of communications. In 2023, Burchell was selected to contest the constituency of St James Southern for the PNP in the next general election.

In the 2025 Jamaican general election, Burchell unseated incumbent MP Homer Davis. She was previously deputy general secretary of the PNP.

In May 2026, Burchell attempted to speak Jamaican Patois in her maiden speech but was prevented by Speaker Juliet Holness under standing orders. She continued her speech in standard English.

== See also ==
- 15th Parliament of Jamaica
