= Communist Party of Jamaica =

- Founded: 1975
- Ideology: Communism; Marxism-Leninism

The Communist Party of Jamaica was a political party in Jamaica, founded in 1975. At the time of the foundation of the party, when the 'Preparatory Committee for a Communist Party of Jamaica' was formed, the Workers Liberation League decided to stay out of it. Instead, the WLL founded the Workers Party of Jamaica (another communist party) three years later. The two parties existed parallel to each other, but the WPJ was larger than the CPJ.

Chris Lawrence was the leading personality in the CPJ. H. L. Sinclair was the chairman of the party. CPJ was linked to the Independent Trade Union Action Council.

In the late 1970s and early 1980s, the party supported the People's National Party.
