= Westmoreland Central =

Jamaican parliamentary constituency

Westmoreland Central is a parliamentary constituency represented in the House of Representatives of the Jamaican Parliament. It elects one Member of Parliament by the first past the post system of election. The constituency consists of the central part of Westmoreland Parish.

== Members ==
Election	Member	Party
2011	Roger Clarke	People's National Party
2014 by-election	Dwayne Vaz	People's National Party
2016	Dwayne Vaz	People's National Party
2020	George Wright	Jamaica Labour Party
2021	George Wright	Independent
