= Damion Crawford =

Jamaican politician

Damion Crawford MP

Minister of State in the Ministry of Tourism and Entertainment
- In office 2012–2016

Member of the Senate of Jamaica
- In office 2017–2019

Member of Parliament for Saint Andrew East Rural
- Incumbent
- Assumed office 3 September 2025
- Preceded by: Joseph Hibbert

Member of the Jamaican Parliament for Saint Catherine North Western
- In office 2011–2016
- Preceded by: Joseph Hibbert
- Succeeded by: Juliet Holness

Personal details
- Born: November 22, 1980 (age 45) Haddo, Westmoreland, Jamaica
- Party: People’s National Party
- Education: University of the West Indies (BSc, MSc); Kingston College
- Occupation: Politician, teacher, entrepreneur

Damion O. Crawford (born November 22, 1980) is a Jamaican politician. He has been the Member of Parliament for the Saint Catherine North Western constituency in the Jamaican parliament since September 2025. He represented Saint Andrew East in the parliament between January 2012 and February 2016.

== Background and education ==
Crawford was born in Haddo, Westmoreland Parish. Crawford attended Kingston College and the University of the West Indies, where he earned bachelor's and master's degrees in tourism management. While completing his master's degree, Crawford served as president of the university's Guild of Students.

== Political career ==
Crawford was elected a member of parliament representing Saint Andrew East Rural in December 2011. He served concurrently as Jamaica's minister of state for tourism and entertainment. Crawford announced in 2015 that he would not run for reelection to the House of Representatives, but later said that his retirement was a "trick." In October 2015, Crawford lost an indicative election held by the People's National Party to Peter Blake. Blake secured 218 delegate votes, while Crawford finished with 166. Following his loss, Crawford was appointed to the Senate of Jamaica on 23 October 2017, where he served alongside an uncle, Ransford Braham. In September 2018, Crawford, Mikael Phillips, and Phillip Paulwell were named vice presidents of the People's National Party. In February 2019, the People's National Party nominated Crawford to contest a by-election in Portland Eastern. He resigned from the senate in March to focus on his campaign. Crawford lost the Portland Eastern seat to Ann-Marie Vaz, and was reappointed to the senate.
