= George Wright (Jamaican politician) =

Jamaican politician

George Wright MP

MP for Westmoreland Central
- In office 3 September 2020 – 3 September 2025
- Preceded by: Dwayne Vaz
- Succeeded by: Dwayne Vaz

Personal details
- Party: Independent (since 2021)
- Other political affiliations: Jamaica Labour Party (until 2021)

George Wright is a Jamaican politician.

== Political career ==
He resigned from the Jamaica Labour Party in June 2021 possibly due to assault allegations levied against him by his wife.
