= Donald Rhodd =

Jamaican doctor and former politician

Member of Parliament
- In office January 1998 – December 2011
- Succeeded by: Lynvale Bloomfield
- Constituency: Portland Eastern

Personal details
- Party: People's National Party

Donald Rhodd is a Jamaican doctor and former politician from the People's National Party.

== Career ==
Rhodd was elected MP for Portland Eastern in January 1998 having been elected in the 1997 Jamaican general election. In 2005, he launched the first online Master of Education Leadership in Early Childhood Development. In 2006, he was appointed Minister of State in the Ministry of National Security. In 2007, he was PNP Region 3 chairman.

He stood down from parliament at the 2011 general election. After politics he became managing director of "Stop the Violence: Love Changes Lives".

Rhodd is an ophthalmologist by profession.

== Personal life ==
Rhodd is a Christian.
