= Convention Independent Party =

Political party in Jamaica

The Convention Independent Party was a political party in Jamaica. It first contested national elections in 1959, when it received fewer than 305 votes and failed to win a seat. It did not contest any further elections.
