= BMSS =

BMSS may refer to:

- Brihan Maharashtra Sugar Syndicate Ltd., an Indian sugar company headquartered in Pune
- British Mass Spectrometry Society, a registered charity encouraging participation in every aspect of mass spectrometry
- Bukit Merah Secondary School, a secondary school in Bukit Merah, Singapore
