= Clarendon South Western =

Parliamentary constituency of Jamaica

Clarendon South Western is a parliamentary constituency represented in the House of Representatives of the Jamaican Parliament. It elects one Member of Parliament (MP) by the first past the post system of election. It is located in Clarendon Parish. The current MP is Lothan Cousins from the People's National Party.

== Members ==
- Noel Arscott (PNP) (2007 to 2020)
