= Herkley Vaz =

Jamaican footballer

Personal information
- Place of birth: Jamaica
- Position: Defender

Senior career*
Years	Team	Apps	(Gls)
1966	Sudbury Italia		

International career
1965	Jamaica	7	(0)
- * Club domestic league appearances and goals

Herkley Vaz is a Jamaican former footballer who played as a defender with the Jamaica national football team.

== Club career ==
Vaz played in the National Soccer League in 1966 with Sudbury Italia. In 1967, he had a trial with the Atlanta Chiefs.

== International career ==
Vaz made his debut for the Jamaica national football team on January 23, 1965, against the Netherlands Antilles national football team. He represented Jamaica in the 1966 FIFA World Cup qualification (CONCACAF).
