= Independent Labour Party (Jamaica) =

The Independent Labour Party was a political party in Jamaica. It first contested national elections in 1959, but received only 0.8% of the vote and failed to win a seat. It did not contest any further elections.
