= Claremont, Jamaica =

Town in Saint Ann Parish, Jamaica

Coordinates: 18.327°N 77.177°W

Location of Claremont in Jamaica

Claremont is a town in Saint Ann Parish, Jamaica. As of 2011, Claremont has a population of 1,773.

The district of Claremont was first called "Finger Post" until it was renamed in honour of the first house built there, "Clermont House". The countryside around the town has been home to the wealthy landed gentry, and is still dotted with estate houses to this day. The wealth associated with the area is seen in the architecture and plan of the town; the shops of Claremont High Street exhibit fine architectural detail and finishing.

The town clock was presented to Claremont in 1915 by Tom Dobson Esq. of Carton Pen.

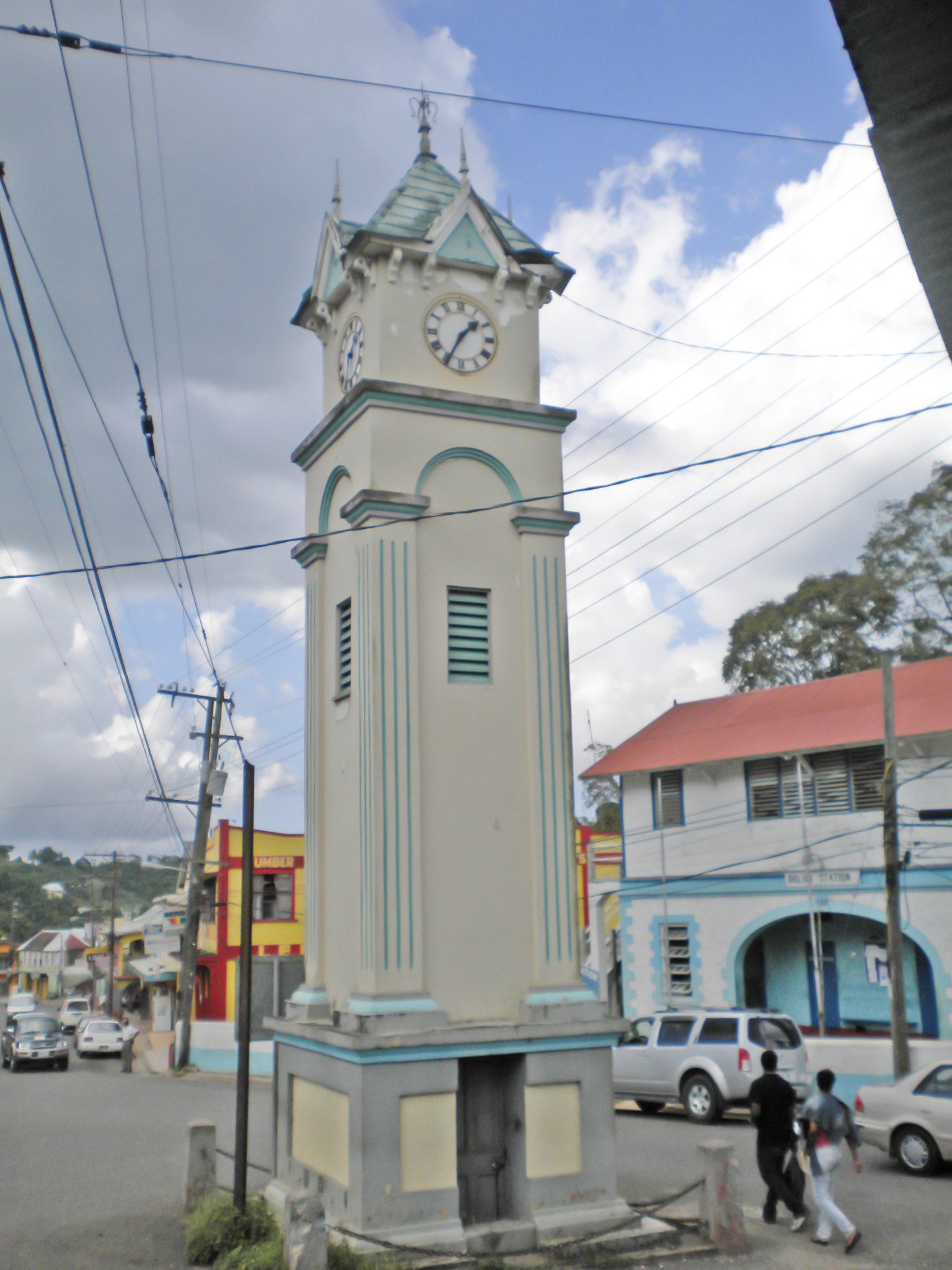
The Clock at Claremont
