= Saint Catherine North Western =

Jamaican parliamentary constituency

Saint Catherine North West is a parliamentary constituency represented in the House of Representatives of the Jamaican Parliament. It elects one Member of Parliament MP by the first past the post system of election.

== Members ==
- John Bernard Stephenson (PNP)
- Robert Pickersgill (PNP) (1989 to 2020)
- Hugh Graham (since 2020)

== Boundaries ==
Constituency covers Lludias Vale and Ewarton.

General Election 2007: Saint Catherine North West
Party	Candidate	Votes	%	±%
PNP	Robert Pickersgill	7,641	57.53	
JLP	Sandra Nesbeth	5,603	42.18	
National Democratic Movement	Gene Guthrie	38	0.29	
Total votes		13,282	100.0	
Turnout			52.05	
PNP hold				
