= Saint Mary South Eastern =

Parliamentary constituency of Jamaica

Saint Mary South East is number 42 on this map.

Saint Mary South Eastern is a parliamentary constituency represented in the Parliament of Jamaica. It elects one Member of Parliament by the first past the post system of election. The constituency covers the south east part of Saint Mary Parish.

== Representation ==
Election	Member	Party
2016	Winston Green	People's National Party
2017	Norman Dunn	Jamaica Labour Party
2025	Christopher Brown	People's National Party
