= Homer Davis =

Jamaican politician

The Honourable Homer Davis CD JP MP

Minister of State in the Ministry of Local Government
- In office 7 September 2020 – 3 September 2025
- Succeeded by: Nekeisha Burchell

MP for Saint James Southern
- Incumbent
- Assumed office 7 September 2020
- Preceded by: Derrick Kellier

Mayor of Montego Bay
- In office December 2016 – September 2020

Personal details
- Party: Jamaica Labour Party

Homer Edward Davis is a Jamaican Labour Party politician who was Minister of State in the Ministry of Local Government and Rural Development.

Davis was unseated by Nekeisha Burchell in the 2025 Jamaican general election.
