= Dwayne Vaz =

Jamaican politician

Member of the Jamaica Parliament for Westmoreland Central

Member of the Jamaica House of Representatives
- Incumbent
- Assumed office 3 September 2025
- Preceded by: George Wright
- In office 2014–2020
- Preceded by: Roger Clarke
- Succeeded by: George Wright

Personal details
- Party: People's National Party

Dwayne Francois St Michael Vaz is a Jamaican politician who was a member of the House of Representatives of the Jamaican Parliament.

Vaz worked as a businessman and community development officer. Vaz was first elected in a 2014 by-election after the death of Roger Clarke.

Vaz was elected again in the 2025 Jamaican general election.
