= Shahine Robinson =

Jamaican politician (1953–2020)

The Honourable Shahine Robinson CD MP

Member of Parliament for Saint Ann North Eastern
- In office 2001 – December 2010
- In office January 2011 – 29 May 2020
- Succeeded by: Marsha Smith

Minister of Transport and Works
- In office November 2011 – January 2012
- Preceded by: Fenton Ferguson
- Succeeded by: Noel Arscott

Minister of Labour and Social Security
- In office October 2011 – December 2011

Minister of Housing, Environment, Water and Local Government
- In office March 2016 – 29 May 2020
- Succeeded by: Mike Henry

Personal details
- Born: Shahine Elizabeth Fakhourie; 4 July 1953 Claremont, Jamaica
- Died: 29 May 2020 (aged 66) Claremont, Jamaica
- Party: Jamaica Labour Party
- Education: Miami Dade College (AA)

Shahine Elizabeth Robinson (née Fakhourie; 4 July 1953 – 29 May 2020) was a Jamaican politician, who served as the Minister of Labour and Social Security. She was a member of the Parliament of Jamaica for Saint Ann North Eastern. She served briefly as the Transport and Works Minister from late November 2011 to January 2012.

== Early life and education ==
Robinson was of Lebanese descent. She was born and raised in Claremont, Saint Ann Parish, where her parents Peter and Kathleen and grandparents all lived. She graduated from Immaculate Conception High School in Jamaica and went on to Miami Dade College, where she earned an associate degree in marketing and a diploma in public relations. She lived in the U.S. intermittently from 1978 to 2001.

== Career ==
Before entering politics, Robinson worked in the banking and tourism sectors. She had been involved at the margins of politics for almost two decades as a JLP supporter, and was tapped by then-Leader of the Opposition Edward Seaga to do more work during Michael Belnavis' leave of absence. She was first elected to Parliament after the resignation of People's National Party MP Danny Melville in 2001, defeating the PNP's Carol Jackson in the resulting by-election. She was naturalised as a U.S. citizen in 2006, while sitting in Parliament. However, the following year, she renounced her citizenship at an Immigration and Naturalization Service office in Key Biscayne, Florida in advance of the 2007 Jamaican general election. She went on to defeat PNP candidate Oswest Senior-Smith in that election by 2,022 votes.

After the 2007 election, former legislator Manley Bowen of the PNP, who was registered as a voter in Robinson's constituency, sought a declaration from the Supreme Court that she was not qualified to be elected due to her alleged dual citizenship. Robinson continued to hold her parliamentary seat until a court removed her in 2010 and ordered her to pay legal costs of J$15.3 million to Bowen. She went through with the formal renunciation procedure, and obtained a Certificate of Loss of Nationality in December 2010. She then won back her old seat in a by-election that month, defeating PNP challenger Devon Evans, and was sworn back in as an MP in January 2011.

In November 2011, Robinson filed a challenge to the costs order in the Supreme Court on the grounds that it was excessive; she particularly objected to the J$5 million paid to professor David P. Rowe for a legal opinion about her citizenship, arguing that the information could have been obtained at much lower cost from U.S. government sources. Later that month, PM Andrew Holness named her Transport and Works Minister, succeeding Mike Henry; the move was a surprise even to Robinson herself. However, in December 2012, Bowen filed a notice of bankruptcy against Robinson in an attempt to compel her to pay the costs he had been awarded. If adjudged bankrupt, Robinson would be disqualified to sit in Parliament. In April 2013, on the day before Supreme Court Justice Lennox Campbell was scheduled to issue his ruling on the costs order appeal, Robinson came to a settlement with Bowen whereby she would pay JM$4 million, or slightly more than a quarter of his original claim.

== Death ==
Robinson died of lung cancer on 29 May 2020. She was 66. A private funeral service was held at the St Matthews Anglican Church in Claremont Saint Ann on July 17, 2020.

== See also ==
- Women in the House of Representatives of Jamaica
