= Robert Pickersgill =

Jamaican politician

Robert Pickersgill MP

MP for Saint Catherine North Western
- In office 1989 – 7 September 2020
- Preceded by: unknown
- Succeeded by: Hugh Graham

Chairman of the People's National Party
- In office 1992–2017

Personal details
- Born: February 26, 1943 (age 83) Kingston, Colony of Jamaica, British Empire
- Party: People's National Party

Robert "Bobby" Pickersgill is a Jamaican politician from the People's National Party. He was Member of Parliament for Saint Catherine North Western from 1989 to 2020.

Pickersgill served as Transport and Works Minister in the early 2000s.
