= Norman Alexander Dunn =

Jamaican politician

The Honourable Dr. Norman Dunn MP
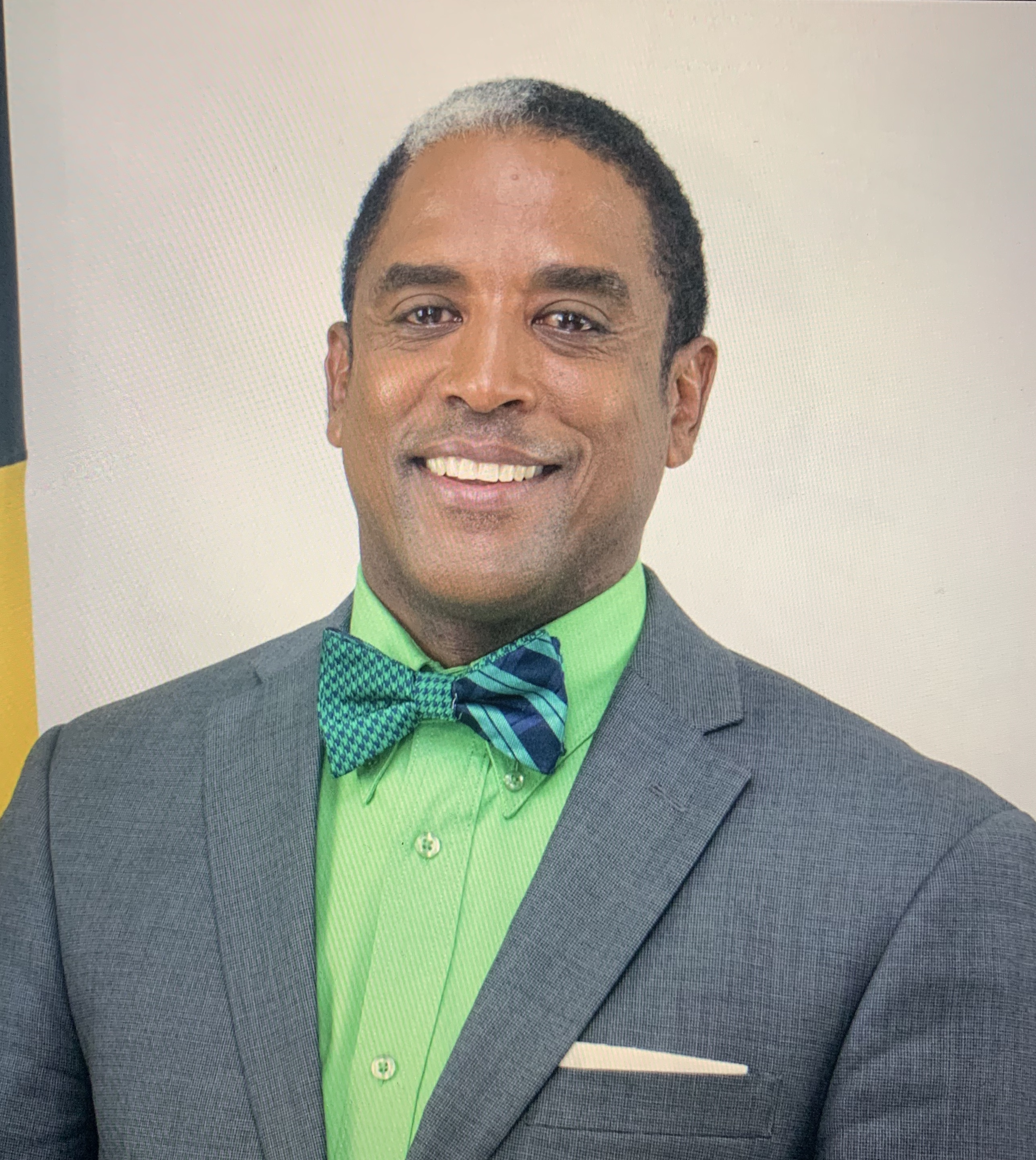
- Official Portrait of Norman Alexander Dunn, MP

Member of Parliament for Saint Mary South Eastern
- In office 30 October 2017 – 3 September 2025
- Preceded by: Winston Green
- Succeeded by: Christopher Brown

Minister of State in the Ministry of Industry, Investment and Commerce
- In office September 2020 – May 2023

Personal details
- Born: 27 June 1967 (age 59) Annotto Bay, St. Mary, Jamaica
- Party: Jamaica Labour Party
- Education: University of the West Indies, Mona (BSc, MSc); University of Technology, Jamaica (BPharm, DPharm)

Norman Alexander Dunn, JP (born 27 June 1967) is a Jamaican pharmacist and politician who was the Member of Parliament for Saint Mary South Eastern, representing the Jamaica Labour Party.

== Early life and education ==
Dunn was born in Annotto Bay, St Mary parish. He pursued his secondary education at Dinthill Technical High School, St Catherine, where he boarded.

He obtained a diploma in pharmacy from the College of Arts, Science and Technology (CAST) in 1987. In 1999, CAST became the University of Technology (UTech). In 1997, Dunn graduated with a bachelor of science degree in management, economics and accounts from the University of the West Indies, Mona, and in 2000 with a master of science degree in industrial business.

In 2009, Dunn graduated with a bachelor of pharmacy degree from UTech, and in 2013 with a doctor of pharmacy degree (PharmD). He was in UTech's first terminal degree cohort.

== Career ==
Dunn is a pharmacist by profession and is a former president of the Pharmaceutical Society of Jamaica. He also served as the Vice President of Jamaica Association of Private Pharmacy Owners and the Third Vice President of the Caribbean Association of Pharmacists. Dunn attributed his business skills to his upbringing- having sold in the local market with his mother and sisters.

=== Representational Politics ===
Dunn's foray into representational politics began in 2016 on a Jamaica Labour Party (JLP) ticket. Having declared the winner on election day, Dunn later lost the magisterial recount by five votes to the People's National Party (PNP) candidate, Dr Winston Green. He never accepted the loss to Green and filed an election petition.

=== 2017 By-Elections ===
Following the passing of the sitting MP, Winston Green on August 17, 2017, Dunn became the JLP standard bearer for the hotly contested by-election which took place on October 31, 2017. Dunn was declared winner of the seat- defeating Shane Alexis of the People's National Party. Dunn received 8,176 votes to defeat Alexis, who polled 7,239 votes. The win for the JLP in St. Mary increased their margin in the House of Representatives.

=== 2025 election ===
Dunn was unseated in the 2025 Jamaican general election by 11 votes.
