= Jamaica Independent Movement =

The Jamaica Independent Party was a political party in Jamaica. It first contested national elections in 1959, when it received fewer than 305 votes and failed to win a seat. It did not contest any further elections.
