= Derrick C. Smith =

Jamaican politician

Derrick Charles Smith OJ OD (born 27 November 1943) is a retired Jamaican politician from the Jamaica Labour Party. He was MP for Saint Andrew North Western from 2007 to 2018, and MP for Kingston West Central between 1983 and 1989.

His son Duane Smith was elected MP for Saint Andrew North Western in a 2024 by-election.
