= Rosalea Hamilton =

Jamaican academic and activist

- Education: Middlesex University; Columbia University; The New School for Social Research; University of London
- Occupations: Trade policy specialist, academic, radio host, advocate

Rosalea Hamilton is a Jamaican academic, trade policy specialist, radio host and advocate. She is Founding Director of the Institute of Law and Economics (ILE) and has hosted a radio programme, Trade Talk. She is also the coordinator of The Advocacy Network, which pushes for constitutional reform in Jamaica.

== Life ==
Rosalea Hamilton travelled to England in 1976 to study social sciences at Middlesex University. She then gained a master's degree in international affairs at Columbia University, a PhD in economics at The New School for Social Research, and an LLB degree in law at the University of London.

In 1996, she returned to Jamaica. In 1998, she established the Institute of Law and Economics. In 2000, she was appointed Special Adviser to Jamaica's Minister of Foreign Trade. From 2003 to 2008, she hosted the radio programme Trade Talk on Power 106 FM. From July 2006 to September 2007, she was chief advisor to the Prime Minister. In January 2008, she was appointed Scotiabank Professor of Entrepreneurship and Development at the University of Technology, Jamaica.

In December 2021, Hamilton welcomed Barbados becoming a republic as "an important step in the unfinished business of decolonisation". Arguing that Jamaica should follow suit, she also called for constitutional change to "strengthen the voice of the people" against the centralization of power in the hands of the Prime Minister of Jamaica. In 2022, Hamilton was an organiser and co-signatory of an open letter on behalf of the Advocates Network, calling for the British monarchy to apologise for colonialism and pay slavery reparations. The letter coincided with protests at the visit of Prince William and Kate Middleton to Jamaica.
