= Politics of Jamaica =

Politics in Jamaica takes place in the framework of a representative parliamentary democratic constitutional monarchy. The 1962 Constitution of Jamaica established a parliamentary system whose political and legal traditions closely follow those of the United Kingdom. As the head of state, King Charles III – on the advice of the prime minister of Jamaica – appoints a governor-general as his representative in Jamaica. The governor-general has a largely ceremonial role, with their parliamentary function consisting simply of granting royal assent to bills which have passed Parliament. Jamaica constitutes an independent Commonwealth realm.

The Constitution vests executive power in the Cabinet, led by the prime minister. Executive power is exercised by the government. Legislative power is vested both in the government and in the Parliament of Jamaica. The prime minister is appointed by the governor-general, the common convention being the leader of the largest party in Parliament.

A bipartisan joint committee of the Jamaican legislature drafted Jamaica's current Constitution in 1962. That Constitution came into force with the Jamaica Independence Act, 1962 of the Parliament of the United Kingdom, which gave Jamaica political independence. Constitutional safeguards include freedom of speech, freedom of the press, freedom of worship, freedom of movement, and freedom of association.

The judiciary operates independently of the executive and the legislature, with jurisprudence based on English common law.

The Economist rated Jamaica a 'flawed democracy' in 2023.

== Legislative branch ==
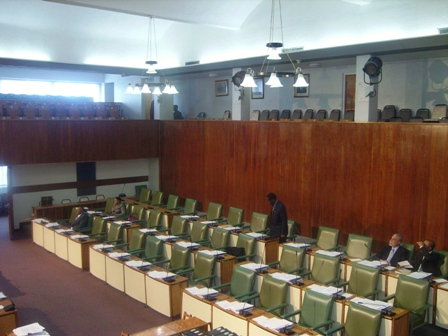
The House of Representatives of Jamaica.

Parliament is composed of an appointed Senate and an elected House of Representatives. The House consists of 63 directly elected members, who appoint their own speaker and deputy speaker. The senate has 21 members appointed for a single parliamentary term; 13 senators are nominated on the advice of the prime minister and 8 on the advice of the Leader of the Opposition. Senate members then elect their own president and deputy president, as long as they are not a minister or parliamentary secretary.

The House of Representatives is where most bills are initiated and where most members of the Cabinet, the Prime Minister included, sit. Every bill, to be passed into law, must be approved by the House, with a quorum of 16 members, in addition to the presiding officer, required for a vote to take place. The House determines all government finance, allocating funds and levying taxes. The House is presided over by the Speaker, who ensures the rules of the chamber are observed, and the Leader of the House, who determines what business will be done each day.

The Senate's main role is reviewing bills passed by the House, however, it may initiate bills as long as they are not to do with money. It may not delay budget bills for more than one month or other bills for more than seven months. No more than 4 members of the cabinet may be selected from the Senate.

Any Commonwealth citizen aged 21 or over who has lived in Jamaica for at least a year before the election is eligible to be elected to the legislature. Those ineligible to be elected consist of those in the defence force, those serving a foreign government, those serving in a public office or justices of the Supreme Court or Court of Appeals.

== Political parties and elections ==
- Jamaica Labour Party
- Marcus Garvey People's Political Party
- National Democratic Movement
- New Nation Coalition
- People's National Party

== Executive branch ==
Main office-holders

The King of Jamaica:
Charles III
since
8 September 2022

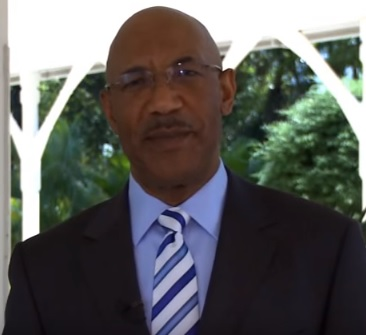
The Governor-General of Jamaica:
Sir Patrick Allen
since
26 February 2009

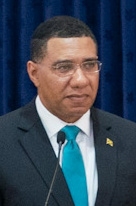
The Prime Minister of Jamaica:
Andrew Holness
since
3 March 2016

The 1962 Constitution established a parliamentary system based on the United Kingdom's Westminster model. As head of state, King Charles III appoints a governor-general, on the advice of the prime minister, as his representative in Jamaica. The governor-general's role is largely ceremonial. Their role is to appoint senior officials of the state, on request from the prime minister, and to grant royal assent to bills that have passed Parliament.

Executive power is vested in King Charles III, but exercised mostly by the Cabinet of Jamaica led by the prime minister, currently Andrew Holness. The Cabinet consists of at least 11 ministers, each delegated a ministry to preside over and direct government policy from. Additionally, there are special bodies called statutory bodies which have direct authority over certain aspects of Government business.

== Elections ==
General elections must be held within five years of the forming of a new government, however, a general election can be held early if the governing party advises the governor-general to do so, or if a majority of members of the House pass a no-confidence motion against the government.

Party	Votes	%	Seats
Jamaica Labour Party	408,376	56.38	49
People's National Party	305,950	42.24	14
Marcus Garvey People's Progressive Party	0	0	0
National Democratic Movement	0	0	0
People's Progressive Party	0	0	0
Independents A	365	0.05	0
Independents B	30	0.00	0
Independents C	790	0.11	0
Invalid/Rejected Ballots	8,806	1.22	–
Total	724,317	100	63
Registered voters/turnout	1,913,410	37.85	–

== Judicial branch ==
The judiciary also is modelled on the British system. The Court of Appeal is the highest appellate court in Jamaica. Under certain circumstances, cases may be appealed to Britain's Judicial Committee of the Privy Council. Jamaica's parishes have elected councils that exercise limited powers of local government.

Firearms offences, including possession of unlicensed guns and ammunition, are tried before a dedicated Gun Court established in 1974. The Gun Court hears cases in camera and practices jury trial only for cases of treason or murder. All other cases are tried by resident magistrates or justices of the Supreme Court of Jamaica.

== Administrative divisions ==
Jamaica is divided in 14 parishes: Clarendon, Hanover, Kingston, Manchester, Portland, St. Andrew, St. Ann, St. Catherine, St. Elizabeth, St. James, St. Mary, St. Thomas, Trelawny, Westmoreland. All parishes are governed by a directly elected parish council, except for Kingston and St. Andrew's which are governed by the same body. According to the Jamaican government website, these authorities are responsible for 'maintaining infrastructure and public facilities such as parochial roads, water supplies, drains, parks and recreational centres, markets, transportation centres and public sanitary conveniences'. Some parish capitals also have mayors.

== Regulatory services ==
Responsibility for water and sanitation policies within the government rests with the Ministry of Water and Housing, and the main service provider is the National Water Commission. An autonomous regulatory agency, the Office of Utilities Regulation (OUR), approves tariffs and establishes targets for efficiency increases, and also oversees the telecommunications industry.

== Foreign relations ==
Jamaica has diplomatic relations with most nations and is a member of the United Nations, The Commonwealth and the Organization of American States. Historically, Jamaica has had close ties with the UK. Trade, financial, and cultural relations with the United States are now predominant. Jamaica is linked with the other countries of the English-speaking Caribbean through the Caribbean Community (CARICOM), and more broadly through the Association of Caribbean States (ACS).

== See also ==
- List of Jamaican ministers of state
- Republicanism in Jamaica
