= Lynvale Bloomfield =

Jamaican politician (1959–2019)

The Honourable Lynvale Bloomfield

Member of Parliament
- In office 29 December 2011 – 2 February 2019
- Preceded by: Donald Rhodd
- Succeeded by: Ann-Marie Vaz
- Constituency: Portland Eastern

Personal details
- Born: 27 October 1959 Duanvale, Trelawny, Portland, Colony of Jamaica, British Empire
- Died: 2 February 2019 (aged 59) Passley Gardens, Portland Parish, Jamaica
- Party: People's National Party
- Education: University of Havana

Lynvale Bloomfield (27 September 1959 – 2 February 2019) was a Jamaican Member of Parliament from the People's National Party (PNP) who was murdered while in office.

== Career ==
A doctor by profession, Bloomfield was first elected to the Parliament of Jamaica in the 2011 general election. He was re-elected in 2016.

== Murder ==
On the morning of 2 February 2019, Bloomfield was found stabbed to death at his home in Passley Gardens. His funeral took place at the Church of the Open Bible in Port Antonio on 23 February 2019. He was buried at Prospect Cemetery. 21-year-old Simeon Anthony Sutherland of Buff Bay in Portland was detained on 13 February and charged with the murder on 2 March. The trial was postponed to April 2022. A bench warrant was issued in November 2022.
