= Workers Party of Jamaica =

Jamaican politician party

The Workers Party of Jamaica (WPJ) was a Marxist-Leninist political party in Jamaica. WPJ was founded on 17 December 1978 by Trevor Munroe, along with Elean Thomas and others. Trevor Munroe, a Rhodes scholar from Oxford University, served as its general secretary. The forerunner of WPJ was the Workers Liberation League.

WPJ was a "critical ally" of the People's National Party (PNP) of Michael Manley. With WPJ backing, the PNP government developed closer relations to Cuba, which irritated the United States. However, in the late 1970s, the WPJ participated in Jamaican popular resistance to fiscal controls imposed on the country by the International Monetary Fund and accepted by Manley. The 1980 elections resulted in a victory of the rightist Jamaica Labour Party. Manley's association with the communist WPJ may have contributed to his defeat.

The WPJ youth organization, Young Communist League of WPJ, was a member of the World Federation of Democratic Youth.

By 1992, the WPJ was defunct.
