= Daryl Vaz =

Jamaican politician

The Honourable Daryl Vaz OJ MP
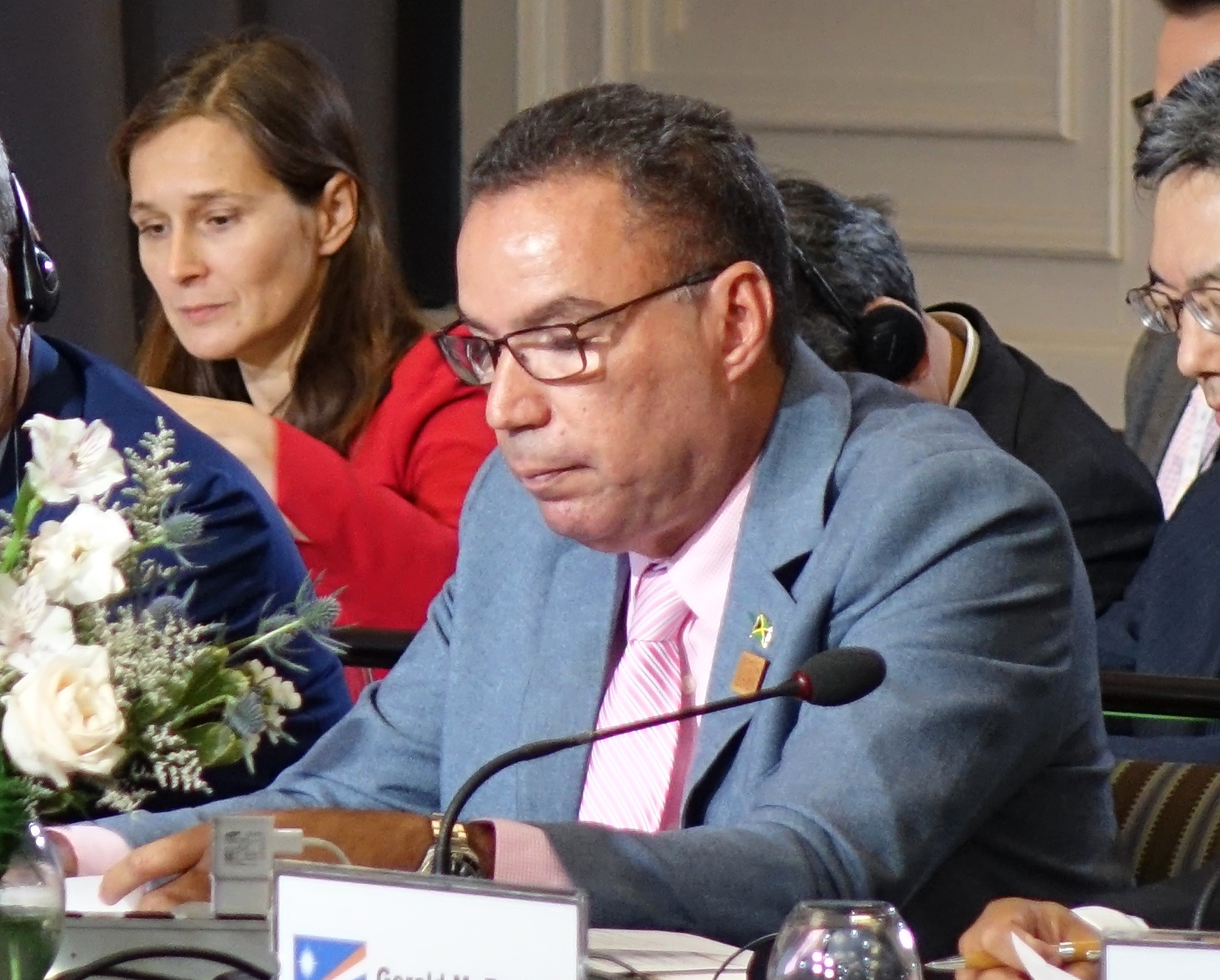

Minister of Energy, Telecommunications and Transport
- Incumbent
- Assumed office September 13, 2020
- Monarchs: Elizabeth II; Charles III
- Preceded by: Fayval Williams

Minister without Portfolio (Ministry of Economic Growth and Job Creation)
- In office 2016–2020

Minister of Information and Telecommunications
- In office 2009–2016

Member of Parliament for Portland Western
- Incumbent
- Assumed office 2016

Personal details
- Born: December 15, 1958 (age 67)
- Spouse: Ann-Marie Lyew (m. 2003)
- Children: 5
- Parent: Douglas Vaz (Father)
- Occupation: Politician, Businessman

Daryl Wesley Phillip Vaz is a Jamaican politician who is the Labour MP for Portland Western. Since 2020 he has served as the Minister for Energy, Telecommunications and Transport.

== Early life and education ==
He was born in Saint Andrew Parish, Jamaica to Douglas and Sonia Vaz. His father is a former president of the Jamaica Manufacturers Association and former Minister of Industry and Commerce.

Vaz attended Mona Preparatory, Campion College and Miami Dade Community College in Miami, Florida.

== Career ==
Vaz's political career began in 1986 when he was elected as the Councillor for the Waterloo Division of the KSAC in the Local Government Elections. In 2007 he was elected Member of Parliament for Western Portland.

From 2006 to 2010 Vaz served as Deputy Treasurer of the Jamaica Labour Party.

In 2009 he was appointed the Minister of Information and Telecommunications in Jamaica from March 2009 to January 2016. His party lost the election in 2011 and Vaz served as opposition spokesman on Telecommunications. Since 2016 he has served as Member of Parliament for the constituency of Portland Parish Western Division. At that time the Jamaica Labour Party returned to government and Vaz was appointed Minister without Portfolio in the Ministry of Economic Growth and Job Creation, with responsibility for land, environment, climate change and investments.

In 2020 Vaz was appointed as Minister for Energy, Science, Telecommunications and Transport. In this role, on 1 July 2025, Vaz announced that the Government of Jamaica formally gave notice to JPS of its intention not to renew its licence under the existing terms.

Outside his political career, Vaz was the Founding President of the Jamaica Used Car Dealers Association.

== Personal life ==
Vaz's wife Ann-Marie Vaz served as MP for Portland Eastern from 2019 to 2025.

== Controversy ==
=== Tainted Money Scandal ===
The Tainted Money Scandal involving Daryl Vaz and Edward Seaga emerged in 2003, raising concerns about campaign financing within the Jamaica Labour Party (JLP). The controversy began when Edward Seaga, then JLP leader, questioned the source of funds used in James Robertson's campaign for Deputy Leader of the JLP's Area Council 2, which was managed by Daryl Vaz. Seaga publicly suggested that "tainted money"—potentially linked to illicit sources—had been used to finance the campaign, prompting an investigation by Police Commissioner Francis Forbes.

Seaga's concerns led to a formal inquiry, with Vaz writing a letter to the police commissioner denying any knowledge of questionable funds. The controversy escalated when Vaz and Robertson's financial team challenged Seaga to provide evidence or retract his claims, even hinting at possible legal action for defamation. The scandal highlighted broader concerns about transparency in political donations, as Jamaica lacked strict regulations on campaign financing at the time.

Politically, the scandal exposed internal divisions within the JLP, particularly between Seaga and Douglas Vaz, Daryl's father, who had clashed with Seaga in the 1980s. It also fueled discussions about public financing for political campaigns, with Seaga proposing talks with Prime Minister P.J. Patterson to explore a state-funded model that would reduce reliance on private donors. While no legal consequences followed, the controversy reinforced public skepticism about the influence of money in Jamaican politics and contributed to ongoing debates about campaign finance reform

=== Dual Citizenship ===
Daryl Vaz engendered some controversy over his dual United States/Jamaican nationality. His mother, Sonia, was born in Puerto Rico and thus is a United States citizen by birth, albeit also a Jamaican citizen, currently resident in Canada. In 2008 or 2009 he renounced his United States citizenship in order to remain active in Jamaican politics.

=== Police Bribery ===
Vaz was charged with corruption after an investigation into a traffic violation and bribery charge involving a close personal friend. Vaz's friend Bruce Bicknell was ticketed on 9 April 2012, in a traffic offence and allegedly presented the police officer with JA$2000 along with vehicle documents. It is alleged that Mr. Vaz told the police sergeant in the case that he would be promoted if he gave Bicknell a chance. Vaz stepped down from his shadow minister post for the Opposition Jamaica Labour Party (JLP), as a result of the corruption charges.

=== US Visa Annotation ===
In 2021, Darl Vaz was reissued a USA Visa after it was cancelled - that US Visa had an annotation that reads: "212(SMALL D) (3) (A) WAIVER of 212 (A) (2C) (1).". Which according to the U.S. Citizenship and Immigration Services refers to a visitor who the consular officer or the US attorney general knows or has reason to believe is or has been an illicit trafficker in any controlled substance or in any listed chemical or is or has been a knowing aider, abettor, assister, conspirator, or colluder with others in the illicit trafficking in any such controlled or listed substance or chemical, or endeavoured to do so.
