= Noel Arscott =

Jamaican politician

Noel Arscott MP

MP for Clarendon South Western
- In office 3 September 2007 – 7 September 2020
- Preceded by: unknown
- Succeeded by: Lothan Cousins

Personal details
- Party: People's National Party

Noel Arscott is a Jamaican politician from the People's National Party. He was Member of Parliament for Clarendon South Western from 2007 to 2020.

He served as Local Government Minister under Portia Simpson-Miller.
