= Saint Andrew North Western =

Parliamentary constituency of Jamaica

Saint Andrew North Western is a parliamentary constituency represented in the House of Representatives of the Jamaican Parliament. It elects one Member of Parliament MP by the first past the post system of election. It has been represented by Duane Smith since a by-election in 2024.

== Members ==
- Derrick C. Smith (until 2018)
- Nigel Clarke (2018–2024)
- Duane Smith (2024–present)

== Boundaries ==
Covers Havendale and Hughenden.

General Election 2007: Saint Andrew North West
Party	Candidate	Votes	%	±%
JLP	Derrick C. Smith	5,786	59.7	
PNP	Jermaine Martin	3,906	40.3	
Total votes		9,692	100.0	
Turnout			57.69	
JLP hold				
