= Nigel A. L. Clarke =

Jamaican politician

The Honourable Dr. Nigel Clarke DPhil MP

Minister of Finance and the Public Service
- In office 26 March 2018 – 30 October 2024
- Prime Minister: Andrew Holness
- Preceded by: Audley Shaw
- Succeeded by: Fayval Williams

Member of Parliament for Saint Andrew North Western
- In office 5 March 2018 – 30 October 2024

Personal details
- Born: Nigel Andrew Lincoln Clarke; 20 October 1971 (age 54) Jamaica
- Party: Jamaica Labour Party
- Education: University of Oxford; The University of the West Indies, Mona; Munro College
- Occupation: Jamaican government official, company director, business executive and statesman
- Profession: Politician, Policymaker, Financier, Mathematician

Nigel Andrew Lincoln Clarke (born 20 October 1971) is the deputy managing director of the International Monetary Fund. He previously served as Minister of Finance and the Public Service of Jamaica. He is a former Jamaican Member of Parliament, company director, business executive and statesman. On 26 August 2024, Clarke was announced as the incoming Deputy Managing Director for the International Monetary Fund.

He has previously served as chairman or director for over 20 Jamaican public and private sector economic enterprises. His public sector directorships have included the Bank of Jamaica (Jamaica's central bank and financial services regulator); Chairman of the Port Authority of Jamaica (the regulator of Jamaica's ports and the developer and owner of Jamaica's cargo and cruise ports); Chairman of the National Housing Trust (Jamaica's state-owned mortgage lender and housing developer) and Chairman of the HEART Trust NTA (Jamaica's largest tertiary level vocational training and certification institution).

Prior to his government service, Clarke served as Vice Chairman of the Musson Group, having served previously as chief operating officer and chief financial officer of the Group and as chief executive officer of its major subsidiaries. Clarke played an integral executive leadership role in the expansion of the Musson Group from a substantially Jamaican base to having operations and subsidiaries in over 30 countries with over US$1 billion in revenues and market leading businesses in telecommunications, information technology, consumer goods and food manufacturing. The Musson Group is a leading Jamaica-based multinational with four associated companies that are listed on the Jamaica Stock Exchange and over 50 other privately held subsidiaries and associated companies. Clarke's executive business experience spanned leadership of transnational mergers and acquisitions, corporate leadership, business development and emerging market business leadership.

== Early life and education ==
Nigel Clarke was born in St. Andrew, Jamaica on 20 October 1971, in an upper middle class family. His father, Justice Neville Clarke, served as a Jamaican Supreme Court judge for several decades while his mother, Mary Clarke, served as head of the Planning Institute of Jamaica (PIOJ) for almost 20 years.

Nigel Clarke first attended St. Richard's Primary School in Kingston. He then went on to study at Munro College in St. Elizabeth, Jamaica. There, he received the Jamaica Independence Scholarship to pursue studies at the University of the West Indies (UWI).

In 1992, he graduated from the UWI with a First-Class Honours degree in Mathematics and Computer Science. He also received an award for having the highest marks among students in the Faculty of Natural Sciences across all campuses of the UWI.

Clarke subsequently received the Commonwealth Scholarship to attend Linacre College at the University of Oxford. There he earned an MSc degree in Applied Statistics in 1994. His thesis examined the volatility of the Jamaican Stock Exchange. He went on to receive the Rhodes Scholarship to pursue further studies at Oxford. In 1997, he earned a Doctor of Philosophy (D.Phil) in Numerical Analysis.

Clarke went on to marry Professor Rupika Deloga, a fellow student whom he met while at Linacre College. They have two children.

== Career ==
=== Political leadership ===
Clarke's foray in politics began in 2016 where he was appointed by Prime Minister Andrew Holness, to serve as Jamaica's Ambassador-at-Large for Economic Affairs within the Office of the Prime Minister. Clarke previously served as a Senator in the Upper House of the Jamaican parliament between 2013 and 2015. He then went on to serve as Member of Parliament for the North West St. Andrew constituency, after winning the by-election to that seat held on 5 March 2018. Shortly afterwards he was appointed the Minister of Finance of Jamaica.

Clarke's tenure as finance minister focused on maintaining macroeconomic stability and navigating the economy through crises. Under his tenure, Jamaica's debt to GDP ratio declined form 110 per cent in 2020 to 72 per cent in 2023.

=== Leadership in business and finance ===
Nigel Clarke played a leadership role in the growth and expansion of the Musson Group from a base in Jamaica to having operations and subsidiaries in over 30 countries in the Caribbean, Central America, Europe and the Pacific.

Clarke is recognised for having led, managed or executed dozens of acquisitions and corporate transactions on behalf of the Musson Group across many sectors. Notable transactions include the acquisition of Nestle's manufacturing business in Jamaica, the acquisition of Kraft Foods manufacturing business in Jamaica, the acquisition of the Serge dairy businesses, the acquisition of several technology-related and telecom businesses in the Caribbean, Central America and Europe among several other such transactions.

Clarke started his career as a derivatives trader in London at Goldman Sachs, the prestigious international investment bank. Since returning to Jamaica in 1999, he has structured and negotiated over US$1 billion of inbound investment for private equity, business development, acquisition finance, trade finance and infrastructure development. Notable private sector transactions include: the securing of over US$300m of direct private equity and debt investment for Jamaican businesses from major international banks and multilateral financial institutions including Citibank NA, the International Finance Corporation, the Inter American Development Bank, the European Investment Bank and the Caribbean Development Bank; the first ever regionally syndicated, locally arranged loan (US$182 million) spanning several jurisdictions in the Caribbean and Central America and across multiple currencies to fund business growth and development across the Caribbean and Central America; the foundation and development of the first ever fund established in the region to finance regional private equity and venture capital (the US$32m Caribbean Investment Fund); and the foundation of Jamaica's first specialist investment fund dedicated to mezzanine financing for business growth (the US$15m Caribbean Mezzanine Fund).

Notable public sector initiatives include the completion of the US$400 million transaction to divest and expand the Kingston Container Terminal; the facilitation of over 5200 new housing starts in 2017 by way of direct construction, direct financing and financing partnerships with financial institutions (representing the fastest pace of low cost housing construction in Jamaica over two decades); and the role of principal interlocutor with the International Monetary Fund, on behalf of the Government of Jamaica, in negotiating the early successful termination of the Extended Fund Facility agreement and the entry into the US$1.6 billion Precautionary Stand-By Arrangement with the Fund. He has delivered policy related addresses to the annual general meetings or other high level fora of the International Monetary Fund, the Organisation of American States, the Clinton Global Initiative and the Caribbean Development Bank.

Clarke's private sector directorships have cut across several industries and include: in the trading and manufacturing sector, Vice Chairman of the Musson Group (a privately held distribution enterprise covering food, technology and telecommunications and employing 5,000 persons across 30 countries), in the financial services sector, the NCB Financial Group (Jamaica's largest financial services holding company), where he also served as a member of the bank's credit committee; in the manufacturing, sector, Red Stripe (the brewing and bottling company); in the agri-business and food processing sectors, Jamaican Broilers Group and Seprod Limited (which collectively include the largest protein, dairy, vegetable oil, and grain producers and distributors operating in Jamaica) In addition, Clarke has served as Chairman of Eppley Limited, a company listed on the Jamaica Stock Exchange that specialises in sourcing, originating and investing in credit-related opportunities. He has also served as Vice Chairman of the PBS Group, the largest regional business solutions and technology distribution company in the Caribbean region with operations and subsidiaries throughout 14 countries of Central America and the Caribbean, which is listed on the Jamaica Stock Exchange.

In addition to his leadership of major economic institutions in the Jamaican public and private sector, Clarke is nationally recognised for his leadership in education and youth empowerment. He served as Chairman of the Heart Trust NTA (Jamaica's largest tertiary level vocational training and certification institution); and founder and Chairman of the National Youth Orchestra of Jamaica which delivers music for social change programmes in Jamaica; He has also produced and hosted the Jamaica International Chess Festival with Grandmaster Maurice Ashley and produced concerts at Carnegie Hall and the Kennedy Center featuring Jamaican artists. His international educational affiliations include service as a Director of the Youth Orchestra of the Americas and the role of Co-organiser and Host of TEDx Jamaica.

== Honours ==
- Dr Clarke was handed the Kiwanis Community Service Award in 2012 from the Kiwanis Club of Kingston.
- Dr. Clarke was also handed the PSOJ "50 under 50" Business Leadership Award in 2012 by the Private Sector Organisation of Jamaica.
