= Saint Ann North Eastern =

Parliamentary constituency of Jamaica

Saint Ann North Eastern is a parliamentary constituency represented in the House of Representatives of the Jamaican Parliament. It elects one Member of Parliament by the first past the post system of election. The constituency consists of the north-east part of Saint Ann Parish. It is represented by Jamaica Labour Party MP Matthew Samuda.

== Members of Parliament ==
- Shahine Robinson (2001 to 2020)
- Marsha Smith (2020-24)
- Matthew Samuda (2024-)
