= Winston Green =

Jamaican politician

Winston Green (1958/1959 – 14 August 2017) was a People's National Party member of the Parliament of Jamaica for Saint Mary South Eastern. Green was a dental surgeon by profession. He spoke out in favour of letting gay Jamaicans serve in Parliament.

At the time of his death in 2017 Green served on the Jamaican Parliament's Internal and External Affairs Committee. In the past he served as Member of the Public Administration and Appropriations Committee (PAAC).
