= Marcus Garvey People's Political Party =

Jamaican political party

The Marcus Garvey People's Political Party (MGPPP; Jamaican Patois: Makus Gavi Piipl’s Politikal Paati) (formerly known as the Marcus Garvey People's Progressive Party) is a political party in Jamaica formed by the merger of two minor parties. The ideology associated with the party is socialist, republican and Pan-Africanist. The party is named after Jamaican National Hero, Marcus Garvey. On election ballots, the party campaign as MG/PPP (or MGPPP) or simply PPP.

The People's Political Party (PPP), founded in 1929 by Garvey, is Jamaica's first political party. In recent years, the Party has been spearheaded by the Rastafari attorney Ras Miguel Lornne. The Party predominantly composes of Rastafaris who have been disenfranchised from political office and tourism in Jamaica, despite their immense contribution to Jamaican culture, and the exporting of Jamaican culture. In the December 2011 election, the MGPPP put forward candidates in ten constituencies, and received between twenty and seventy-six votes each out of the thousands of votes cast.

During the colonial era, the British colonial government in Jamaica tried to crush any activity by the Black majority that might upset their colonial order. From the 1890s, the British tried to eradicate "influential religio-racial leaders." In the mid 1920s, Blacks who promoted Black nationalism where deemed by the colonisers as a threat to their interest and colonial rule. In 1920, the colonisers viewed Marcus Garvey's People's Political Party as a threat to the status quo, as it demanded independence from Britain. Temple University Associate Professor, Charles Price, writes that, in The Daily Gleaner, an author of that paper described the speeches of PPP candidates as:

"noxious doctrines," introduced to an "ignorant minori

ty,...a criminal minority; and it is always possible that these might at any moment, being intoxicated by foolish doctrines, break out of control and suffer the consequences."

Following the death of MGPPP's President, Moses Emanuel Henriques in February 2012, he was succeeded by Leon Burrell, the Caribbean history teacher.

The MGPPP nominated six candidates in the 2016 Jamaican general election.

The party failed to register for the 2025 Jamaican general election as mandated by the Political Party Registration Act, 2014 and its candidates were required to run as independents.
