= Ann-Marie Vaz =

Jamaican politician

The Honourable Ann-Marie Lyew-Vaz MP

Member of Parliament
- In office 16 April 2019 – 3 September 2025
- Preceded by: Lynvale Bloomfield
- Succeeded by: Isat Buchanan
- Constituency: Portland Eastern

Personal details
- Born: Ann-Marie Theresa Latoya Lyew; 13 March 1966 (age 60)
- Party: Jamaica Labour Party
- Spouse: Daryl Vaz (m. 2003)

Ann-Marie Theresa Vaz (née Lyew; born 13 March 1966) is a Jamaican politician who served as the Member of Parliament for the Portland Eastern constituency from 2019 to 2025.

== Life ==
She was born Ann-Marie Theresa Lyew on 13 March 1966 and raised in the Duff House district, bordering Manchester Parish and Saint Elizabeth Parish. Lyew lived with her grandmother, mother, and half-sister Trisha Thompson, among other relatives. Lyew attended the Bull Savannah Basic School, then New Forest Primary and Junior High, followed by the Hampton School. She also studied at Alpha Academy and Excelsior Community College before enrolling at the University of the West Indies. Lyew was a flight attendant prior to working for her first husband Christoper Wood's business. Following the end of her ten-year marriage to Wood, Lyew married Daryl Vaz in 2003. Together, they have one child and raised four others from Daryl Vaz's previous partnerships. Prior to her political career, Ann-Marie Vaz founded the One Jamaica Foundation to improve Jamaican educational infrastructure, and served as its chair.

Ann-Marie Vaz contested the 4 April 2019 by-election for the Portland Eastern constituency as a member of the Jamaica Labour Party, and faced the People's National Party candidate Damion Crawford. A preliminary vote count by the Electoral Office of Jamaica favored Vaz, as did the final result. This was the largest turnout for any election in Portland Eastern. Vaz became the first woman to represent Portland Eastern, as well as the first Jamaica Labour Party politician from the constituency to be seated in parliament.

Vaz was sworn into office on 16 April 2019. Vaz's swearing-in ceremony was attended by her grandmother, Eva May Wright, who died five months later, on 15 September 2019, aged 99. Vaz announced in May 2019 that she had established a fund for tertiary student expenses, using the first month of her salary as a sitting parliamentarian.

At the 2025 Jamaican general election, Vaz lost her seat to the PNP challenger Isat Buchanan.
