= Roger Clarke (politician) =

Jamaican politician (1940–2014)

The Honourable Roger Clarke CD MP JP

Minister of Agriculture
- In office 2012–2014
- In office 1998–2007

Member of Parliament for Saint Elizabeth North Eastern
- In office 1991–2014

Personal details
- Born: Roger Harold Clifford Clarke; June 11, 1940 Westmoreland, Colony of Jamaica
- Died: August 28, 2014 (aged 54)
- Party: People's National Party

Roger Harold Clifford Clarke (June 11, 1940 – August 28, 2014) was a Jamaican politician. He was the Minister of Agriculture from 2012 until his death.

Clarke, who had recovered from a successful back surgery at Jackson Memorial Hospital, died on August 28, 2014, from a suspected heart attack at Fort Lauderdale International Airport in Florida, where he was awaiting a flight to Jamaica. He was pronounced dead at hospital.
