= Elections in Jamaica =

The Parliament of Jamaica has two chambers:

- The House of Representatives has 63 members, elected for a five-year term in single-seat constituencies.
- The Senate has 21 appointed members: 13 chosen by the Prime Minister and 8 by the Leader of the Opposition.

Jamaica effectively has a two-party system: there are two dominant political parties, and it is difficult for other parties to achieve electoral success. The two parties were founded in 1938 and 1943 and first contested the 1944 election.

Though the years are fixed due to the five-year term of the prime minister, the date of the election is traditionally announced by the ruling party one month in advance. Recently, there has been debate over whether this "flexible date" system is the best for Jamaica, or whether the government should switch to a fixed date system.

== The first election ==
The most recent elections held in Jamaica were the Local Government Elections of 2024, held on February 26, 2024.

The next elections are the 2025 General Elections.

== Election reform ==
In 2008, Prime Minister Bruce Golding acknowledged at a Conference for the Association for Caribbean Electoral Organizations that there were a number of areas of concern in his country's election process including political financing for campaigns, the accountability of the electoral process and the impact positive or negative of the media on elections. The Prime Minister said that the government is looking at a number of activities that could help this process of reform. These things were acknowledged in front of the CEO of the International Foundation for Electoral Systems, the Assistant Secretary General of the Organization of American States and the Electoral Office of Jamaica.

== See also ==
- List of political parties in Jamaica
