= Portland Eastern =

Parliamentary constituency of Jamaica

Portland East is a parliamentary constituency represented in the House of Representatives of the Jamaican Parliament. It elects one Member of Parliament MP by the first past the post system of election.

The incumbent MP is Isat Buchanan of the People's National Party, who has represented the constituency since the 2025 general election.

== Members ==
Election	Member	Party	Notes
1997	Donald Rhodd	People's National Party	
2011	Lynvale Bloomfield	People's National Party	Died in office
2019 by-election	Ann-Marie Vaz	Jamaica Labour Party	
2020	Ann-Marie Vaz	Jamaica Labour Party	
2025	Isat Buchanan	People's National Party	

== Boundaries ==
Encompasses the Portland communities of Fellowship, Port Antonio and Fairy Hill.

General Election 2007: Portland East
Party	Candidate	Votes	%	±%
PNP	Donald Rhodd	8,202	52.48	
JLP	Dennis Wright	7,428	47.52	
Total votes		15,630	100.0	
Turnout			60.32	
PNP hold				
