= National Democratic Movement (Jamaica) =

Jamaican political party

National Democratic Movement Nashinal Dehmokratic Movement
- Leader: Peter Townsend
- Chairman: Michael Williams
- General Secretary: Lorenzo Bogle
- Congress of Young Democrats President: Matthew Barton
- Founded: 29 October 1995
- Split from: Jamaica Labour Party
- Headquarters: Kingston, Jamaica
- Young Professional Arm: Congress of Young Democrats (CYD)
- Ideology: Conservatism; Decentralisation; Reformism
- Political position: Centre-right

Website
- www.ndmjamaica.com

The National Democratic Movement (NDM) (NDM; Jamaican Patois: Nashinal Dehmokratik Movement) is a conservative political party in Jamaica, led by Peter Townsend.

In the 29 December 2011 elections, the party received 265 votes, but won no seats.

== Overview ==
The NDM was formed in 1995 by Brascoe Lee and Bobby Marsh. Bruce Golding was invited to become the first President. Golding was the chairman of the Jamaica Labour Party (JLP) before he and others decided to split. In their 1997 manifesto, the party expresses the reasons why they broke from the JLP. Namely, they believed that after gaining independence from the United Kingdom in 1962, Jamaicans had suffered from the harsh combination of a stagnant economy and a rapidly growing population. They believed that the Jamaican people needed major reform in order to create a more equitable, stable society. The party made its presence known in the general election in December 1997. Although the two main political parties of Jamaica received the majority of votes, the NDM received the most votes of all minor parties in each constituency.

Golding rejoined the JLP in 2002 and served as JLP leader and Prime Minister.

In recent years, the NDM acts more as a medium for discussion than as a threat to the two major political parties of Jamaica, the JLP and People’s National Party (PNP). On August 26, 2003, Michael Williams, the General Secretary of the NDM, wrote an article in the Jamaica Gleaner addressing the party’s performance in recent elections and their vision for the future and assured Jamaicans that “We [the NDM] will continue to promote our vision of Unity, Hope and Prosperity for Jamaicans and ‘a new day and a new way and a new Jamaica’.” The Chairman of the NDM is Michael Williams.

The NDM formed a partnership with the New Nation Coalition known as the National Coalition in 2011.

The Youth Arm of the NDM was relaunched in 2013, the Congress of Young Democrats (led by Matthew Barton).
