= Rastafari =

Abrahamic new religious movement originating in 1930s Jamaica

Rastafari often claim the flag of the Ethiopian Empire as was used during Haile Selassie's reign. It combines the conquering lion of Judah, symbol of the Ethiopian monarchy, with red, gold, and green

Rastafari is an Abrahamic religion that developed in Jamaica during the 1930s. It is classified as both a new religious movement and a social movement by scholars of religion. There is no central authority in control of the movement and much diversity exists among practitioners, who are known as Rastafari, Rastafarians, or Rastas.

Rastafari beliefs are based on an interpretation of the Christian Bible. Central to the religion is a monotheistic belief in a single God, referred to as Jah, who partially resides within each individual. Rastas accord key importance to Haile Selassie, Emperor of Ethiopia between 1930 and 1974. Many see him as the Second Coming of Jesus and Jah incarnate; others deem him a human prophet. Rastafari is Afrocentric and focuses attention on the African diaspora, which it believes is oppressed within "Babylon", meaning Western capitalist society. Many Rastas call for this diaspora's resettlement in Africa, a continent they consider "Zion", the Promised Land. Rastas refer to their practices as "livity", which includes adhering to Ital dietary requirements, wearing their hair in dreadlocks, and following patriarchal gender roles. Communal meetings are known as "groundations", and are typified by music, chanting, discussions, and the smoking of cannabis, the latter regarded as a sacrament with beneficial properties.

Rastafari originated among impoverished and socially disenfranchised Afro-Jamaican communities in 1930s Jamaica. A reaction against Jamaica's then-dominant British colonial culture, it was influenced by both Ethiopianism and the Back-to-Africa movement promoted by black nationalist figures such as Marcus Garvey. The religion developed after several Protestant Christian clergymen, most notably Leonard Howell, proclaimed that Haile Selassie's 1930 crowning as Emperor of Ethiopia fulfilled a biblical prophecy. By the 1950s, Rastafari's countercultural stance had brought the movement into conflict with wider Jamaican society, including violent clashes with law enforcement. Early Rastafari often espoused black supremacy as a form of opposition to white supremacy, but this has gradually become less common since the 1970s. In the 1960s and 1970s, it gained increased respectability within Jamaica and greater visibility abroad through the popularity of Rastafari-inspired reggae musicians, most notably Bob Marley. Enthusiasm for Rastafari declined in the 1980s following the deaths of Selassie and Marley, but the movement has survived and maintains a presence in many parts of the world.

The Rastafari movement is decentralised and organised on a largely sectarian basis. There are several denominations, or "Mansions of Rastafari", the most prominent of which are the Nyabinghi, Bobo Ashanti, and the Twelve Tribes of Israel, each offering a different interpretation of Rastafari belief. There is an estimated 700,000 to 1 million Rastafari worldwide. The largest population is in Jamaica, although small communities can be found in most of the world's major population centres. Most Rastafari are of African descent, and some groups accept only black members, but non-black groups have also emerged.

== Definition ==
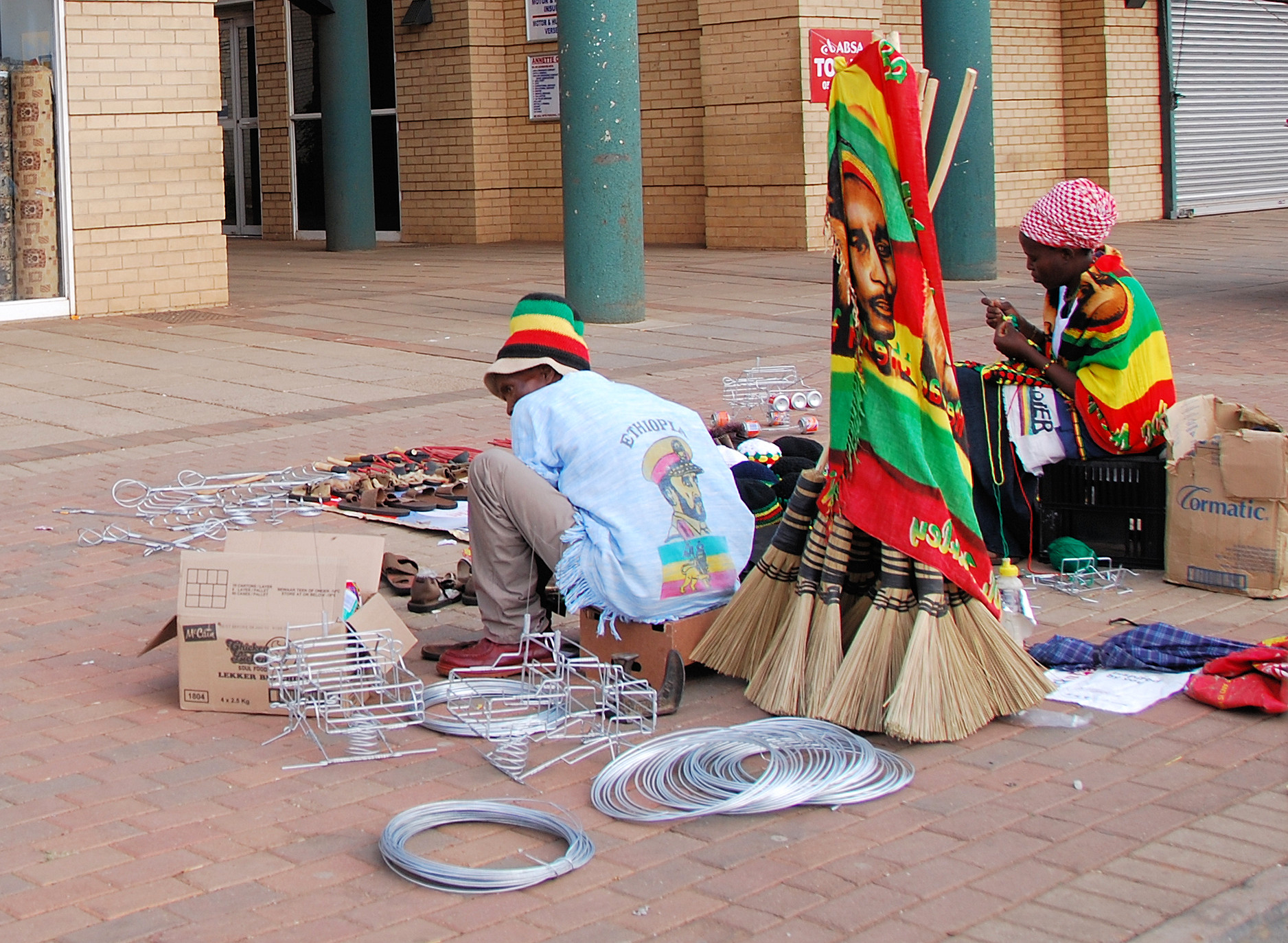
Two Rastafarians in Zeerust, South Africa; they are wearing and selling items that display their commitment to the religion

Rastafari is a religion, meeting many of the proposed definitions for what constitutes a religion, and is legally recognised as such in various countries. Some scholars of religion have labelled it an Abrahamic religion, while other scholars have also classified it as a new religious movement, a sect, a cult, and a revitalisation movement. Having arisen in Jamaica, it has been described as an Afro-Jamaican religion, and more broadly an Afro-Caribbean religion.

Although Rastafari emphasises Africa as a source of identity, it is a product of creolisation processes in the Americas, described by the Hispanic studies scholars Margarite Fernández Olmos and Lizabeth Paravisini-Gebert as "a Creole religion, rooted in African, European, and Indian practices and beliefs". The scholar Ennis B. Edmonds also suggested that Rastafari was "emerging" as a world religion, not because of the number of its adherents, but because of its global spread. Many Rastas nevertheless reject descriptions of Rastafari as a religion, instead referring to it as a "way of life", a "philosophy", or a "spirituality".

Given its political support of African nationalism and pan-Africanism, some academics have characterised Rastafari as a political movement, a "politico-religious" movement, or a protest movement. It has alternatively been labelled a social movement, or more specifically as a new social movement, and a cultural movement. Many Rastas or Rastafarians—as practitioners are known—nevertheless dislike the labelling of Rastafari as a "movement". In 1989, a British Industrial Tribunal concluded that, for the purposes of the Race Relations Act 1976, Rastafarians could be considered an ethnic group because they have a long, shared heritage which distinguished them from other groups, their own cultural traditions, a common language, and a common religion.

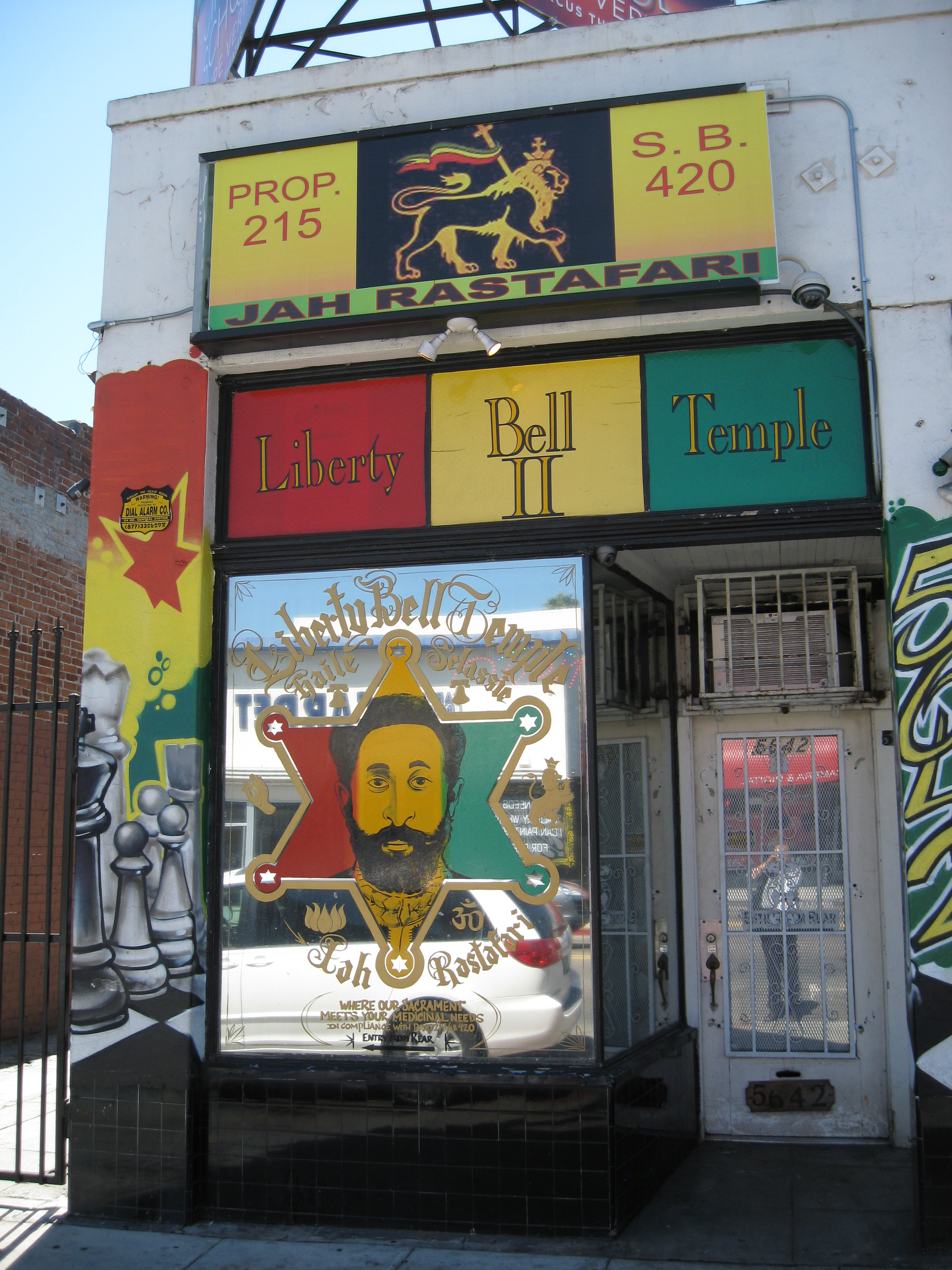
The Liberty Bell Temple, a Rasta place of worship in Los Angeles

Rastafari has continuously changed and developed. It is not a unified movement, and there has never been a single leader followed by all Rastafari. Different Rasta groups exist, each promoting different variations on its basic teachings. It is thus difficult to make broad generalisations about the movement without obscuring the complexities within it. The scholar of religion Darren J. N. Middleton suggested that it was appropriate to speak of "a plethora of Rasta spiritualities" rather than a single phenomenon.

The term "Rastafari" derives from "Ras Tafari Makonnen", the pre-regnal title of Haile Selassie, the former Ethiopian emperor who occupies a central role in Rasta belief. The term "Ras" is a title of nobility equivalent to a duke or prince in the Ethiopian Semitic languages; "Tafari Makonnen" was Selassie's personal name. It is unknown why the early Rastas adopted this form of Haile Selassie's name as the basis of the term for their religion. As well as being the religion's name, "Rastafari" is also used for the religion's practitioners themselves.

Many commentators—including some academic sources and some practitioners—refer to the movement as "Rastafarianism". However, the term is disparaged by many Rastafari, who believe that the use of -ism implies religious doctrine and institutional organisation, things they wish to avoid.

== Beliefs ==
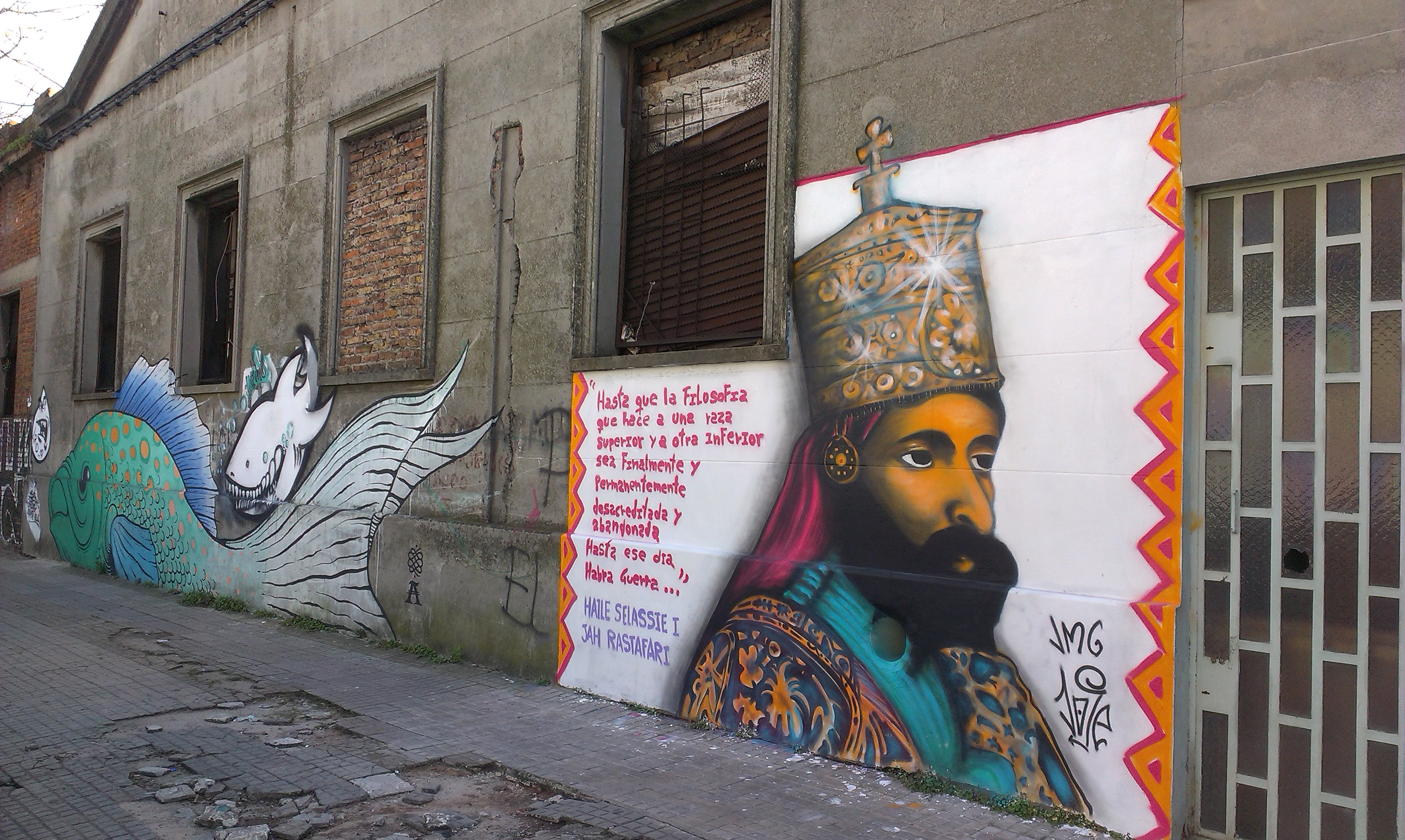
Rastafari graffiti, depicting Haile Selassie, on a building in Uruguay

Rastafari outlines a fairly cohesive worldview, with Rastas often calling these beliefs "Rastalogy". Attempts to summarise Rastafari teaching have never been accorded the status of a catechism or creed. Instead, Rasta beliefs are open to interpretation, with Rastas emphasising the idea that personal experience and intuitive understanding should be used to determine the truth or validity of a belief or practice. No Rasta, therefore, has the authority to declare which beliefs and practices are orthodox and which are heterodox. The conviction that Rastafari has no dogma "is so strong that it has itself become something of a dogma", according Peter B. Clarke, a scholar of the sociology of religion.

The scholar Michael Barnett called Rastafari "an Afrocentralized blend of Christianity and Judaism", with the religion being deeply influenced by Christian and Jewish thought. Some Rastas consider themselves Christian. Like Christianity, Rastafari treats the Bible as a holy book which is central to its belief system. Rastas often adopt a literalist interpretation of its contents, utilising it as a source book from which to form their own beliefs and practices. Contrary to scholarly understandings of the Bible's history, Rastas commonly believe the Bible was originally written on stone in the Ethiopian language of Amharic, maintaining that it is an authentic account of African history that explains the Africans' place as God's favoured people. They believe the Bible to be key to understanding both the past and the present and for predicting the future; the Bible's final book, the Book of Revelation, is often seen as being particularly important for understanding the world's present situation.

Rastas believe that the Bible's true meaning has been warped through mistranslation and by deliberate manipulation by those seeking to deny black Africans their history. They also regard the Bible as cryptographic, meaning that it has many hidden meanings. They believe that its true teachings can be revealed through intuition and meditation on the "book within" which allows them to commune with God. Because of what they regard as the corruption of the Bible, Rastas also turn to other sources that they believe shed light on African history, including Leonard Howell's 1935 work The Promised Key, Robert Athlyi Rogers' 1924 book Holy Piby, and Fitz Balintine Pettersburg's 1920s work, the Royal Parchment Scroll of Black Supremacy. Many Rastas also treat the Kebra Nagast, a 14th-century Ethiopian text, as a source through which to interpret the Bible.

=== Jah and Jesus Christ ===
Rastas are monotheists, worshipping a singular God whom they call Jah. The term "Jah" is a shortened version of "Jehovah", the name of God in English translations of the Old Testament. Rastas believe in the immanence of Jah, meaning that he is inherent within each individual. This is reflected in the common Rasta aphorism that "God is man and man is God", and Rastas speak of "knowing" Jah, rather than "believing" in him. This idea of divinity existing within each person differs from the spirit possession found in other African diaspora religions such as Kumina.

Jesus is an important figure in Rastafari. However, practitioners reject the traditional Christian view of Jesus and the common depiction of him as a white European. They believe Jesus was a black African, with white Jesus being a false god. Some Rastas believe that the God of white Christians is actually the Devil, and a recurring claim among Rastas is that the Pope is Satan or the Antichrist. Rastas often regard Christianity as the creation of the white man, a religion that has helped oppress the African diaspora, trapping them in a form of "mental enslavement". Many Rastas believe that the oppressors (white Europeans) and the oppressed (black Africans) cannot share the same God.

=== Haile Selassie ===
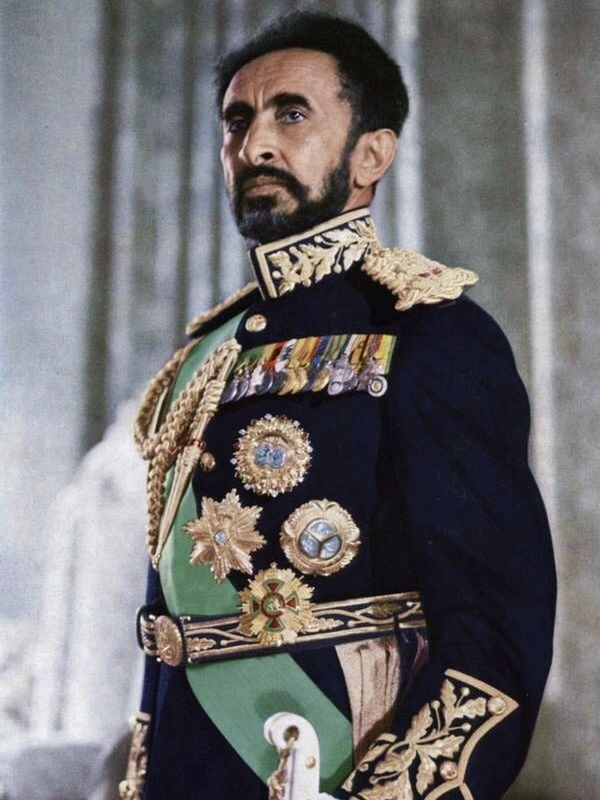
Haile Selassie, Emperor of Ethiopia between 1930 and 1974. He is of central importance to Rastas, many of whom regard him as the Second Coming of Jesus and thus God incarnate in human form.

Rastafari is intrinsically linked with Haile Selassie, the Emperor of Ethiopia from 1930 to 1974. He is the central figure in Rastafari ideology, and all Rastas hold him in esteem, although precise interpretations of his identity differ.

Many Rastas believe that Haile Selassie was the Second Coming of Jesus, legitimising this by reference to their interpretation of the nineteenth chapter of the Book of Revelation. In viewing Haile Selassie as Jesus, these Rastas regard him as the messiah prophesied in the Old Testament, the manifestation of God in human form, and "the living God". Some perceive him as part of the Trinity, alongside God as Creator and the Holy Spirit, the latter called "the Breath within the temple". Rastas viewing Haile Selassie as Jesus argue that both descended from the royal line of the Biblical king David, further highlighting that Haile Selassie's Makonnen dynasty claimed descent from the Biblical figures Solomon and the Queen of Sheba.

Other Rastas do not believe Selassie was Jesus, but think that he embodied Jesus' teachings and essence. For them, Selassie is a messenger of God rather than a manifestation of God himself. Members of the Twelve Tribes of Israel denomination, for instance, reject the idea that Selassie was the Second Coming, arguing that this event has yet to occur. Rastas holding to this view sometimes regard the deification of Haile Selassie as ignorant, in some cases thinking it as dangerous to worship a human being as God. Certain Rastas went from believing that Haile Selassie was Jesus and thus God incarnate to seeing him as a distinct entity.

While he was emperor, many Jamaican Rastas thought that Haile Selassie would never die. Haile Selassie's 1974 overthrow by the military junta known as the Derg and his subsequent death in 1975 resulted in a crisis of faith for many practitioners. Some left the movement altogether. Others remained, concluding that Selassie did not really die and that claims to the contrary were Western misinformation. To bolster their argument, they pointed to the absence of a corpse; in reality, Selassie's body had been buried beneath his palace, remaining undiscovered until 1992. Another perspective within Rastafari acknowledged that Selassie's body had perished, but maintained that his inner spiritual essence survived. A third response within the Rastafari community was that Selassie's death was inconsequential as he had only been a "personification" of Jah rather than Jah himself.

During his life, Selassie described himself as a devout Christian. In a 1967 interview, Selassie was asked about the Rasta belief that he was the Second Coming of Jesus, to which he responded: "I have heard of this idea. I also met certain Rastafarians. I told them clearly that I am a man, that I am mortal, and that I will be replaced by the oncoming generation, and that they should never make a mistake in assuming or pretending that a human being is emanated from a deity." His grandson Ermias Sahle Selassie has said that there is "no doubt that Haile Selassie did not encourage the Rastafari movement". Critics of Rastafari have used this as evidence that Rasta theological beliefs are incorrect, although some Rastas take Selassie's denials as evidence that he was indeed the incarnation of God, based on their reading of the Gospel of Luke. (Note: Luke 14:11)

=== Afrocentrism and race ===
The eastern African nation of Ethiopia is given great prominence in Rasta doctrine.

According to Clarke, Rastafari is "concerned above all else with black consciousness, with rediscovering the identity, personal and racial, of black people". The movement began among Afro-Jamaicans who wanted to reject the British colonial culture that dominated Jamaica and replace it with a new identity based on a reclamation of their African heritage. It decenters Europe and whiteness and emphasises Africa and blackness, seeking to purge from its followers any belief in the inferiority of black people and the superiority of white people. Rastafari is Afrocentric, equating blackness with the African continent, and endorsing Pan-Africanism.

Rastas identify themselves with the ancient Israelites—God's chosen people in the Old Testament—and believe that they, or black Africans more broadly, are either the descendants or reincarnations of this ancient people. This is similar to beliefs in Judaism, although Rastas often deny that contemporary Jews are descended from the ancient Israelites. For most Rastas, black Africans are God's chosen people, for they made a covenant with him and thus bear special responsibilities. Rastafari maintains that this, the true identity of black Africans, has been lost and must be reclaimed.

There is no uniform Rasta view on race. Black supremacy was common early in the movement, including the belief in a distinct black African race that was superior to other racial groups. Consequently, the religion has been accused of racism. While some Rastas retain such beliefs, black supremacy has waned in the movement since at least the 1970s, and non-black Rastas are now widely accepted. Some Rastas cite a 1963 speech by Haile Selassie in support of racial acceptance. Although certain sects maintain that white Europeans can never be legitimate Rastas, others believe an "African" identity is not inherently linked to black skin but to whether an individual displays an African "attitude" or "spirit".

=== Exile in Babylon ===
Rastafari teaches that the black African diaspora are exiles living in "Babylon", a term it applies to Western society. For Rastas, European colonialism and global capitalism are manifestations of Babylon, with police and soldiers as its agents. The term "Babylon" is adopted by Rastas because of its Biblical associations. In the Old Testament, Babylon is the Mesopotamian city where the Israelites were held captive, exiled from their homeland, in the 6th century BCE; Rastas compare the Israelites' exile to that of the African diaspora outside Africa. Rastas perceive this exile as an experience of great suffering, with the term "suffering" having significance in Rasta discourse.

Rastas view Babylon as being responsible for both the Atlantic slave trade, which removed enslaved Africans from their continent, and ongoing poverty in the African diaspora. They believe Biblical scripture explains the Atlantic slave trade, and that the enslavement, exile, and exploitation of black Africans was punishment for failing to live up to their status as Jah's chosen people. Many Rastas, adopting a Pan-Africanist ethos, have criticised Africa's division into nation-states, regarding this as a Babylonian development, as well as capitalist resource extraction from the continent. Rastas seek to delegitimise and destroy Babylon, a sentiment conveyed in the Rasta aphorism "Chant down Babylon". Rastas often expect white-dominated society to dismiss their beliefs as false, and when this happens they see it as confirmation of the correctness of their faith.

=== Return to Zion ===
Rastas view Zion as an ideal to which they aspire. As with "Babylon", this term comes from the Bible, where it refers to an idealised Jerusalem. Rastas use "Zion" either for Ethiopia or for Africa more broadly. Many Rastas use the term "Ethiopia" as a synonym for Africa, following its usage in English translations of the Bible. Rastas in Ghana, for instance, describe themselves as already living within "Ethiopia". Other Rastas apply the term "Zion" to Jamaica or use it to describe a state of mind.

A map of Ethiopia, sometimes called "Zion" by Rastas

During Rastafari's first three decades, it placed strong emphasis on the need for the African diaspora to return to Africa. Many perceived Africa as a Promised Land where they would be free from the domination and degradation experienced in Babylon. To this end, various Rastas lobbied the Jamaican government and United Nations to oversee this resettlement process. Other Rastas organised their own transportation to Africa. Critics of the movement argued that the migration of the entire African diaspora to Africa is implausible and would not be welcomed by any African country.

By the movement's fourth decade, the desire for physical repatriation to Africa had declined among Rastas, a change influenced by observation of the 1983–1985 famine in Ethiopia. Rather, many Rastas saw the idea of returning to Africa in a metaphorical sense, entailing the restoration of their pride and self-confidence as people of black African descent. The term "liberation before repatriation" began to be used within the movement, with some Rastas seeking to transform Western society rather than leaving it. Many Rastas nevertheless continue to emphasise the need for the African diaspora's resettlement in Africa.

=== Salvation and paradise ===
Rastafari is a millenarian movement, maintaining that the present age will come to an apocalyptic end. Many practitioners believe that on this Day of Judgment, Babylon will be overthrown, with Rastas being the chosen few who survive the upheaval. With Babylon destroyed, Rastas believe that humanity will enter a "new age", a millennium of peace, justice, and happiness in which the righteous shall live in Africa. In the 1980s, many Rastas believed that the Day of Judgment would happen around the year 2000. A view then common in the Rasta community was that white people would wipe themselves out through nuclear war, with black Africans then ruling the world, something that they argued was prophesied in the Book of Daniel. (Note: Daniel 2:31–32)

==== Death and reincarnation ====
Rasta views on death vary. Traditionally, many Rastas believed in the possibility of eternal life. In the 1980s, scholar of religion Leonard E. Barrett observed Jamaican Rastas who thought that practitioners who died had not been faithful to Jah. He suggested that this attitude stemmed from the large numbers of young people in the movement, who had thus seen very few Rastas die. Another common Rasta view is that those who are righteous may undergo reincarnation.

Rastas traditionally avoid death and funerals, meaning that many are given Christian funerals by their relatives. This attitude to death is less common among more recent or moderate strands of Rastafari, with many considering death a natural part of life. Unlike other African diaspora religions, Rastas typically avoid ancestor veneration.

=== Morality, ethics, and gender roles ===
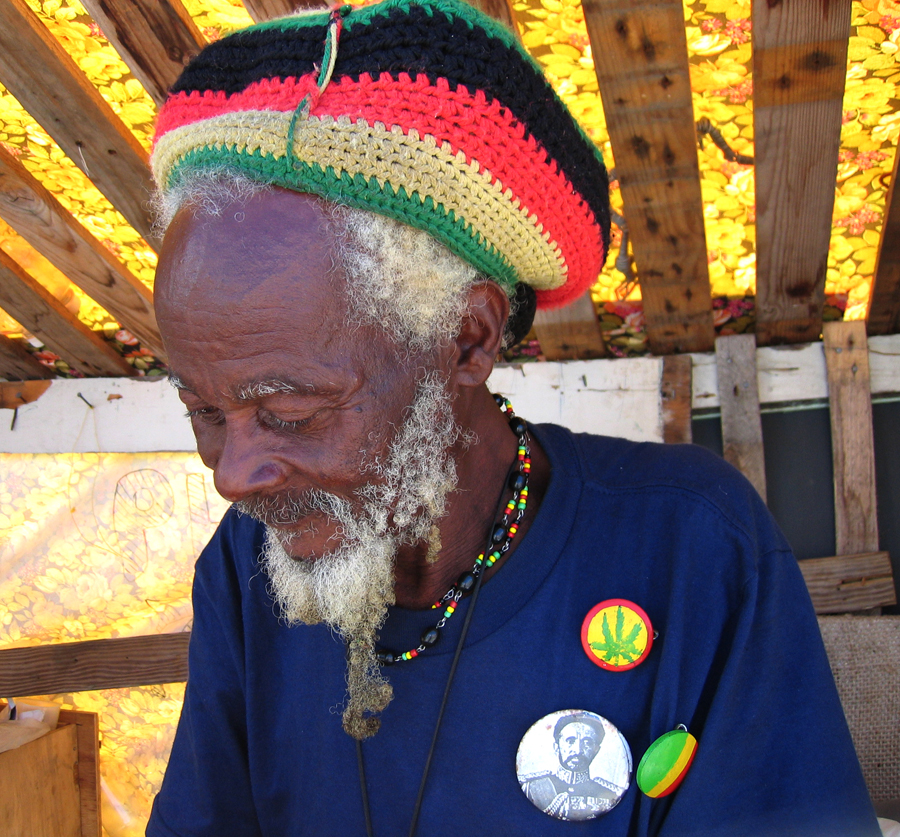
A Rasta in Barbados, wearing a rastacap decorated in the Rastafari colours: green, gold, red and black

Most Rastas promote "two great commandments": love of God and love of neighbour. Many Rastas believe that to determine whether they should undertake a certain act or not, they should consult the presence of Jah within themselves.

Rastafari emphasizes the idea of "living naturally". It presents Africa as the natural abode of black Africans—a continent where they can live according to African culture and be themselves on a physical, emotional, and intellectual level. Practitioners believe that Westerners in Babylon have detached themselves from nature through technological development and thus become slothful and decadent. Different Rastas follow the concept of living naturally to different extents. Most will try to eat healthily, grow their hair and beard, avoid violence, as well as decline unnecessary surgery like plastic surgery or circumcision.

Some Rastas believe they should adhere to African laws rather than those of Babylon, potentially putting them at odds with the law of the countries in which they reside. In emphasising this Afrocentric approach, Rastafari expresses overtones of black nationalism.

The scholar Maureen Warner-Lewis observed that Rastafari combined a "radical, even revolutionary" stance on socio-political issues, particularly regarding race, with a "profoundly traditional" approach on other issues. Rastas typically look critically upon capitalism, instead favouring small-scale, pre-industrial and agricultural societies. Some Rastas have promoted activism for socio-political reform; others believe in awaiting change through divine intervention. In Jamaica, Rastas typically do not vote, dismissing politics as "politricks", and rarely involve themselves in political parties or unions. The Rasta tendency to believe that socio-political change is inevitable opens the religion up to leftist criticism that it discourages attempts to alter the status quo. Other Rastas do engage in political activism; the Ghanaian Rasta singer-songwriter Rocky Dawuni for instance campaigned for democratic elections, while in Grenada, many Rastas joined the People's Revolutionary Government formed in 1979.

==== Gender roles ====
Drawing on the Book of Leviticus and the writings of Paul the Apostle, Rastafari has traditionally presented women as morally weak and susceptible to deception by evil. It often deems women impure while menstruating; this is cited as a reason for women sitting separately from men during worship. Rastafari often also teaches that men in the African diaspora have been emasculated by Babylon and that their manhood must be restored.

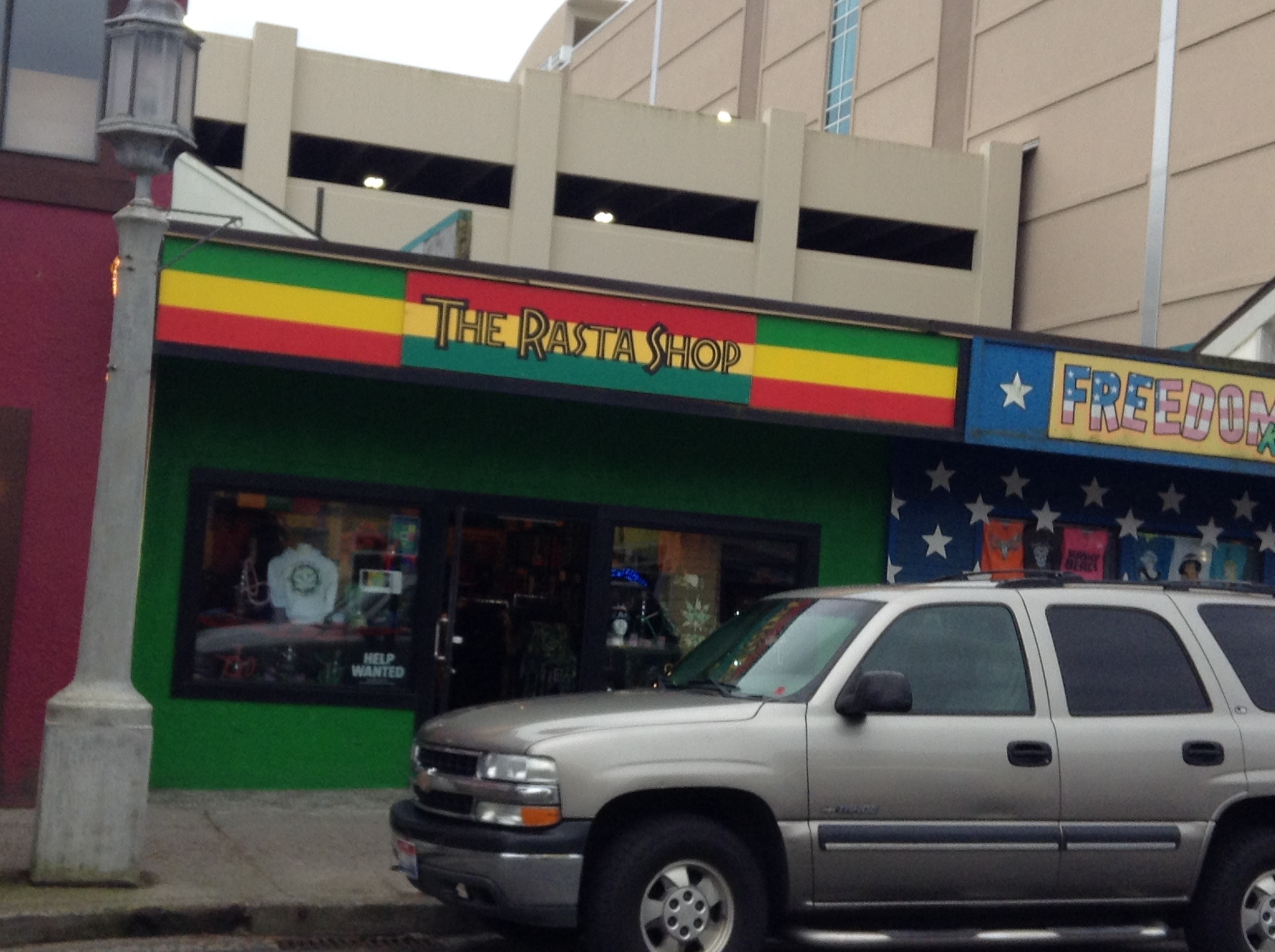
The Rasta Shop, a store selling items associated with Rastafari in the U.S. state of Oregon

Rastafari affirms patriarchal principles, calling for women to submit to male leadership. External observers—including scholars such as Cashmore and Edmonds—have claimed that Rastafari accords women an inferior position to men. The academic Maureen Rowe suggested that women were willing to join the religion despite its restrictions because they valued the structure and discipline it provided. Attitudes to women within Rastafari have changed since the 1970s, however, with a growing "womanist" movement and increasing numbers of women in leadership positions.

Rasta women usually wear clothing that covers their head and hides their body contours. Trousers are usually avoided, with long skirts preferred. Women are expected to cover their head while praying, and in some Rasta groups this is expected of them whenever in public. According to traditional Rasta discourse, this dress code is necessary to prevent the sexual objectification of women. Rasta men do not usually have such a dress code. Some Rasta women have challenged gender norms by wearing their hair uncovered in public and donning trousers.

==== Sexuality ====
Historically, Rastafari did not promote monogamy. Although not especially common, polygamy is permitted for Rasta men, while women are expected to reserve their sexual activity for one male partner. Common-law marriage is the norm, although many Rastas are legally married. Rasta men refer to their female partners as "queens", "empresses", or "lionesses", while the males in these relationships are known as "kingmen". Reproduction is encouraged, with great importance placed on family life and raising children. Traditionally, the religion emphasised men's role in child-rearing, associating this with the recovery of African manhood. Women would often work, sometimes while the man raised the children at home.

As Rastafari regards procreation as the purpose of sex, oral and anal sex are usually forbidden. Both contraception and abortion are similarly censured; many Rastas believe these were inventions of Babylon to decrease the black African birth-rate. Rastas typically express hostility to homosexuality, citing negative references to same-sex sexual activity in the Bible. Many Rastas typically saw the growing societal acceptance of birth control and homosexuality as evidence of Babylon's degeneration as it approaches its demise. LGBTQ+ Rastas may conceal their sexual orientation because of these attitudes.

== Practices ==
Rastas call their cultural and religious practices "livity". The religion does not emphasise hierarchies, having no professional priesthood; Rastas believe there is no need for a mediator between the worshipper and Jah. It nevertheless has "elders", an honorific title bestowed upon Rastas with a good reputation. They do not necessarily have administrative responsibilities, although may oversee gatherings, where they are often responsible for helping to interpret current events in terms of Biblical scripture. Elders often communicate with each other to plan movement events and form strategies.

=== Grounding ===
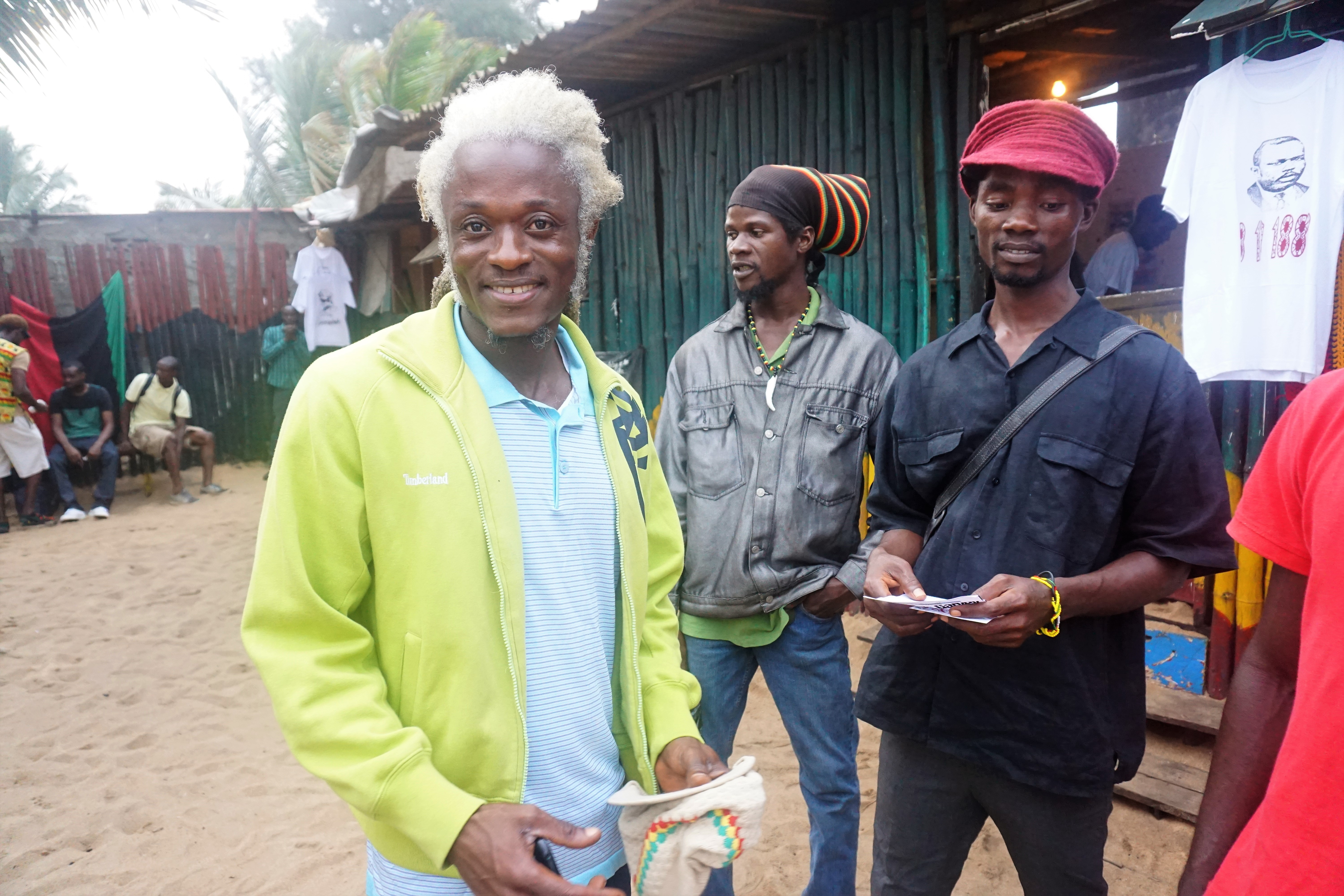
A group of Rastas in Liberia celebrating Marcus Garvey's birthday

The term "grounding" is used among Rastas to refer to the establishment of relationships between like-minded practitioners. Groundings often take place in a commune or yard, and are presided over by an elder, who is charged with keeping discipline and can ban individuals from attending. The number of participants can range from a handful to several hundred. Activities that take place at groundings include the playing of drums, chanting, the singing of hymns, and the recitation of poetry. Cannabis, known as ganja, is often smoked. Most groundings contain only men, although some Rasta women have established their own all-female grounding circles.

A central activity at groundings is "reasoning". This is a discussion among assembled Rastas about the religion's principles and their relevance to current events. These discussions are supposed to be non-combative, although attendees can point out the fallacies in any arguments presented. Those assembled inform each other about the revelations that they have received through meditation and dream. Each contributor is supposed to push the boundaries of understanding until the entire group has gained greater insight into the topic under discussion. In meeting together with like-minded individuals, reasoning helps Rastas to reassure one another of the correctness of their beliefs. Rastafari meetings are opened and closed with prayers. These involve supplication to Jah for the vulnerable and needy, calls for the destruction of the Rastas' enemies, and closing statements of adoration.

Princes shall come out of Egypt, Ethiopia shall stretch forth her hand unto God. Oh thou God of Ethiopia, thou God of divine majesty, thy spirit come within our hearts to dwell in the parts of righteousness. That the hungry be fed, the sick nourished, the aged protected, and the infant cared for. Teach us love and loyalty as it is in Zion.

— Opening passage of a common Rasta prayer

The largest groundings were known as "groundations" or "grounations" in the 1950s, although they were subsequently re-termed "Nyabinghi Issemblies". The term "Nyabinghi" is adopted from the name of a mythical African queen. Nyabinghi Issemblies are often held on dates associated with Ethiopia and Haile Selassie. These include Ethiopian Christmas (7 January), the day on which Haile Selassie visited Jamaica (21 April), Selassie's birthday (23 July), Ethiopian New Year (11 September), and Selassie's coronation day (2 November). Some Rastas also organise Nyabinghi Issemblies to mark Jamaica's Emancipation Day (1 August) and Marcus Garvey's birthday (17 August).

Nyabinghi Issemblies typically take place in rural areas, being situated in the open air or in temporary structures—known as "temples" or "tabernacles"—constructed for the purpose. Any elder seeking to sponsor a Nyabinghi Issembly must have approval from other elders and requires the adequate resources to organise such an event. The assembly usually lasts between three and seven days. During the daytime, attendees engage in food preparation, ganja smoking, and reasoning, while at night they focus on drumming and dancing around bonfires. Nyabinghi Issemblies often attract Rastas from a wide area, including from different countries. They establish and maintain a sense of solidarity among the Rasta community and cultivate a feeling of collective belonging. Unlike in many other religions, rites of passage play no role in Rastafari; on death, various Rastas have been given Christian funerals by their relatives, as there are no established Rasta funeral rites.

=== Use of cannabis ===
Rastafari's principal ritual is the smoking of ganja, also known as marijuana or cannabis. Rastas give various names to the plant, including callie, Iley, "the herb", "the holy herb", "the grass", and "the weed". Cannabis is usually smoked during groundings, although some practitioners also smoke it in other contexts. Some Rastas smoke cannabis very frequently, something other practitioners regard as excessive. Many practitioners also consume cannabis in a tea, as a spice in cooking, and as an ingredient in medicine. Not all Rastas use cannabis; many abstainers explain that they have already achieved a higher level of consciousness and thus do not require it.

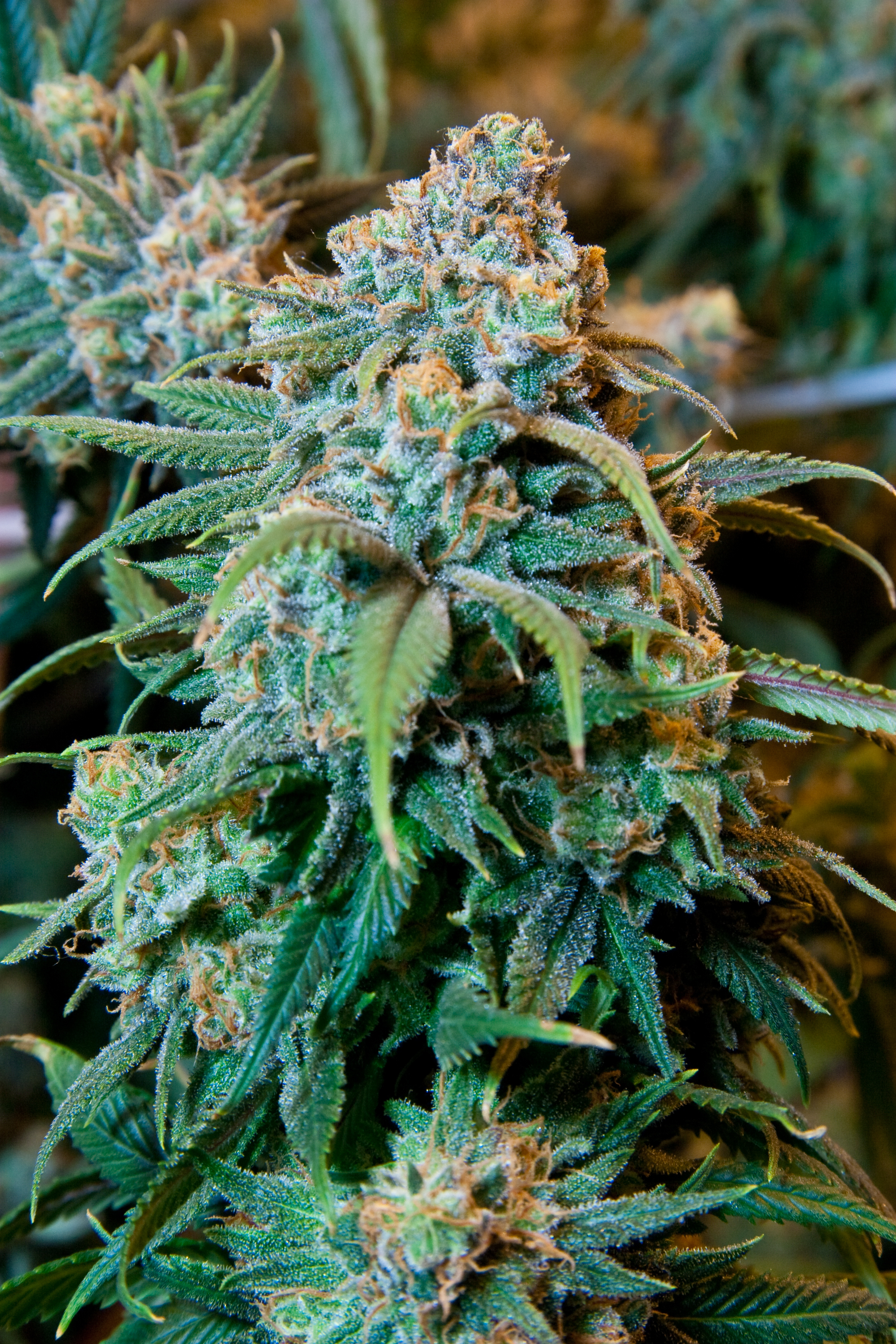
A flowering cannabis plant; the smoking of which is considered a Biblically sanctioned sacrament by Rastas

In Rastafari, cannabis is considered a sacrament. Rastas argue that its use is promoted in the Bible, specifically in Genesis, (Note: Genesis 1:29) Psalm, (Note: Psalms 18:8) and Revelation. (Note: Revelation 22:2) They regard it as having healing properties, eulogise it for inducing feelings of "peace and love", and claim that it cultivates a form of personal introspection that allows the smokers to discover their inner divinity. Some Rastas believe that cannabis smoke serves as an incense that counteracts immoral practices in society.

Rastas typically smoke cannabis in the form of a large, hand-rolled cigarette known as a spliff. This is often rolled together while a prayer is offered to Jah; the spliff is lit and smoked only when the prayer is completed. At other times, cannabis is smoked in a water pipe referred to as a chalice: styles include kutchies, chillums, and steamers. The pipe is passed in a counter-clockwise direction around the assembled circle of Rastas.

There are various options that might explain how cannabis entered Rastafari. In the 19th century, enslaved Bakongo people arrived in Jamaica, where they established the religion of Kumina. In Kumina, cannabis was smoked to facilitate possession by ancestral spirits. It may have been through Kumina that cannabis became part of Rastafari. A second possible source was the use of cannabis in Hindu rituals. Hindu indentured servants arrived in Jamaica from British India between 1834 and 1917, and brought cannabis with them. Cannabis use may also have been influenced by the widespread recreational use of cannabis among Afro-Jamaicans in the early 20th century. Early Rastafarians may have taken an element of Jamaican culture which they associated with their peasant past and the rejection of capitalism and sanctified it by according it Biblical correlates.

In many countries – including Jamaica – cannabis is illegal and by using it, Rastas protest the laws of Babylon. In the United States, for example, thousands of practitioners have been arrested because of their possession of the drug. Rastas have also advocated for the legalisation of cannabis in those jurisdictions where it is illegal; in 2015, Jamaica decriminalized personal possession of marijuana up to two ounces, and in 2019 Barbados legalised cannabis' use in religious settings.

=== Music ===
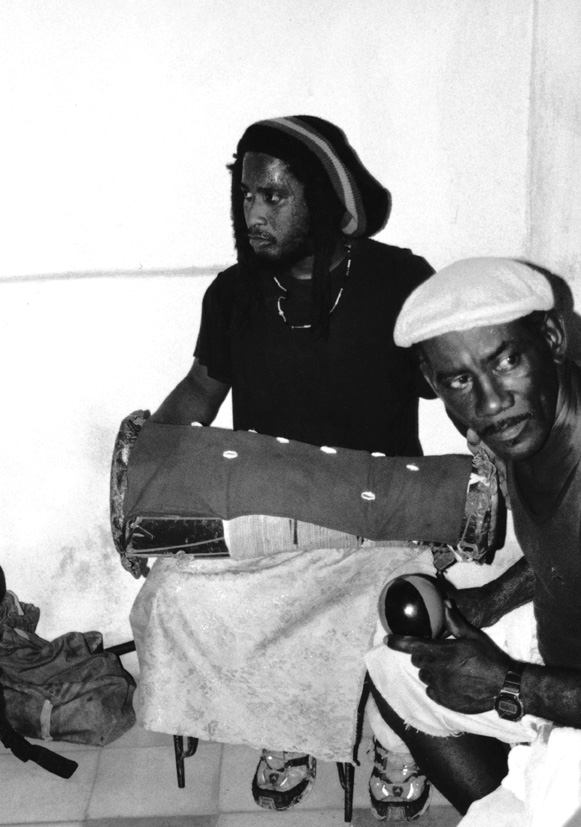
A Rasta playing a batá drum

Rastafari music developed at reasoning sessions, where drumming, chanting, and dancing are all present. Rasta music is performed to praise and commune with Jah, and to reaffirm the rejection of Babylon. Rastas believe that their music has healing properties, with the ability to cure colds, fevers, and headaches. Many of these songs are sung to the tune of older Christian hymns, but others are original Rasta creations.

The bass-line of Rasta music is provided by the akete, a three-drum set, which is accompanied by percussion instruments like rattles and tambourines. A syncopated rhythm is then provided by the fundeh drum. In addition, a batá drum improvises over the rhythm. The different components of the music are regarded as displaying different symbolism; the bassline symbolises blows against Babylon, while the lighter beats denote hope for the future.

As Rastafari developed, popular music became its chief communicative medium. During the 1960s, ska was a popular musical style in Jamaica, and although its protests against social and political conditions were mild, it gave early expression to Rasta socio-political ideology. Particularly prominent in the connection between Rastafari and ska were the musicians Count Ossie and Don Drummond. Ossie was a drummer who believed that black people needed to develop their own style of music; he was heavily influenced by Burru, an Afro-Jamaican drumming style. Ossie subsequently popularised this new Rastafari ritual music by playing at various groundings and groundations around Jamaica, with songs like "Another Moses" and "Babylon Gone" reflecting Rasta influence. Rasta themes also appeared in Drummond's work, with songs such as "Reincarnation" and "Tribute to Marcus Garvey".

1968 saw the development of reggae in Jamaica, a musical style typified by slower, heavier rhythms than ska and the increased use of Jamaican Patois. Like calypso, reggae was a medium for social commentary, although it demonstrated a wider use of radical political and Rasta themes than were previously present in Jamaican popular music. Reggae artists incorporated Rasta ritual rhythms, and also adopted Rasta chants, language, motifs, and social critiques. Songs like The Wailers' "African Herbsman" and Peter Tosh's "Legalize It" referenced cannabis use, while tracks like The Melodians' "Rivers of Babylon" and Junior Byles' "Beat Down Babylon" referenced Rasta beliefs in Babylon. Reggae gained widespread international popularity during the mid-1970s, coming to be viewed by black people in many different countries as music of the oppressed. Many Rastas grew critical of reggae, believing that it had commercialised their religion. Although reggae contains much Rastafari symbolism, and the two are widely associated, the connection is often exaggerated by non-Rastas. Most Rastas do not listen to reggae music, and reggae has also been utilised by other religious groups, such as Protestant Evangelicals. Out of reggae came dub music; dub artists often employ Rastafari terminology, even when not Rastas themselves.

=== Language and symbolism ===
Rastas typically regard words as having an intrinsic power, seeking to avoid language that contributes to servility and self-degradation. Practitioners often use their own form of language, known commonly as "dread talk", "Iyaric", and "Rasta talk". Developed in Jamaica during the 1940s, this language fosters group identity and cultivates particular values. Adherents believe that by formulating their own language they are launching an ideological attack on the integrity of the English language, which they view as a tool of Babylon. The use of this language helps Rastas distinguish and separate themselves from non-Rastas, for whom—according to Barrett—Rasta rhetoric can be "meaningless babbling". However, Rasta terms have also filtered into wider Jamaican speech patterns.

Rastas regularly use the three colours of the Ethiopian flag for their movement, although they often add black to this tricolour, symbolising the black skin of the African people

Rastas make wide use of the pronoun "I". This denotes the Rasta view that the self is divine, and reminds each Rasta that they are not a slave and have value, worth, and dignity. For instance, Rastas use "I" in place of "me", "I and I" in place of "we", "I-ceive" in place of "receive", "I-sire" in place of "desire", "I-rate" in place of "create", and "I-men" in place of "Amen". Rastas refer to this process as "InI Consciousness" or "Isciousness". Rastas typically refer to Haile Selassie as "Haile Selassie I", thus indicating their belief in his divinity. Rastas also typically believe that the phonetics of a word should be linked to its meaning. For instance, Rastas often use the word "downpression" in place of "oppression" because oppression bears down on people rather than lifting them up, with "up" being phonetically akin to "opp-". Similarly, they often favour "livicate" over "dedicate" because "ded-" is phonetically akin to the word "dead". In the early decades of the religion's development, Rastas often said "Peace and Love" as a greeting, although the use of this declined as Rastafari matured.

Rastas widely use the colours red, black, green, and gold. Red, gold, and green appeared in the Ethiopian flag, while the Jamaican black nationalist Marcus Garvey had used red, green, and black as the colours for his Pan-African flag. According to Garvey, the red symbolised the blood of martyrs, the black symbolised the skin of Africans, and the green represented the vegetation of the land, an interpretation endorsed by some Rastas. The colour gold is often included alongside Garvey's three colours; it has been adopted from the Jamaican flag, and may be interpreted as symbolising Africa's mineral and resource wealth. Rastas often paint these colours onto their buildings, vehicles, and kiosks, or display them on their clothing, helping Rastas to recognise each other. Rastas often accompany these three or four colours with the image of the Lion of Judah, also adopted from the Ethiopian flag and symbolizing Haile Selassie.

=== Diet ===
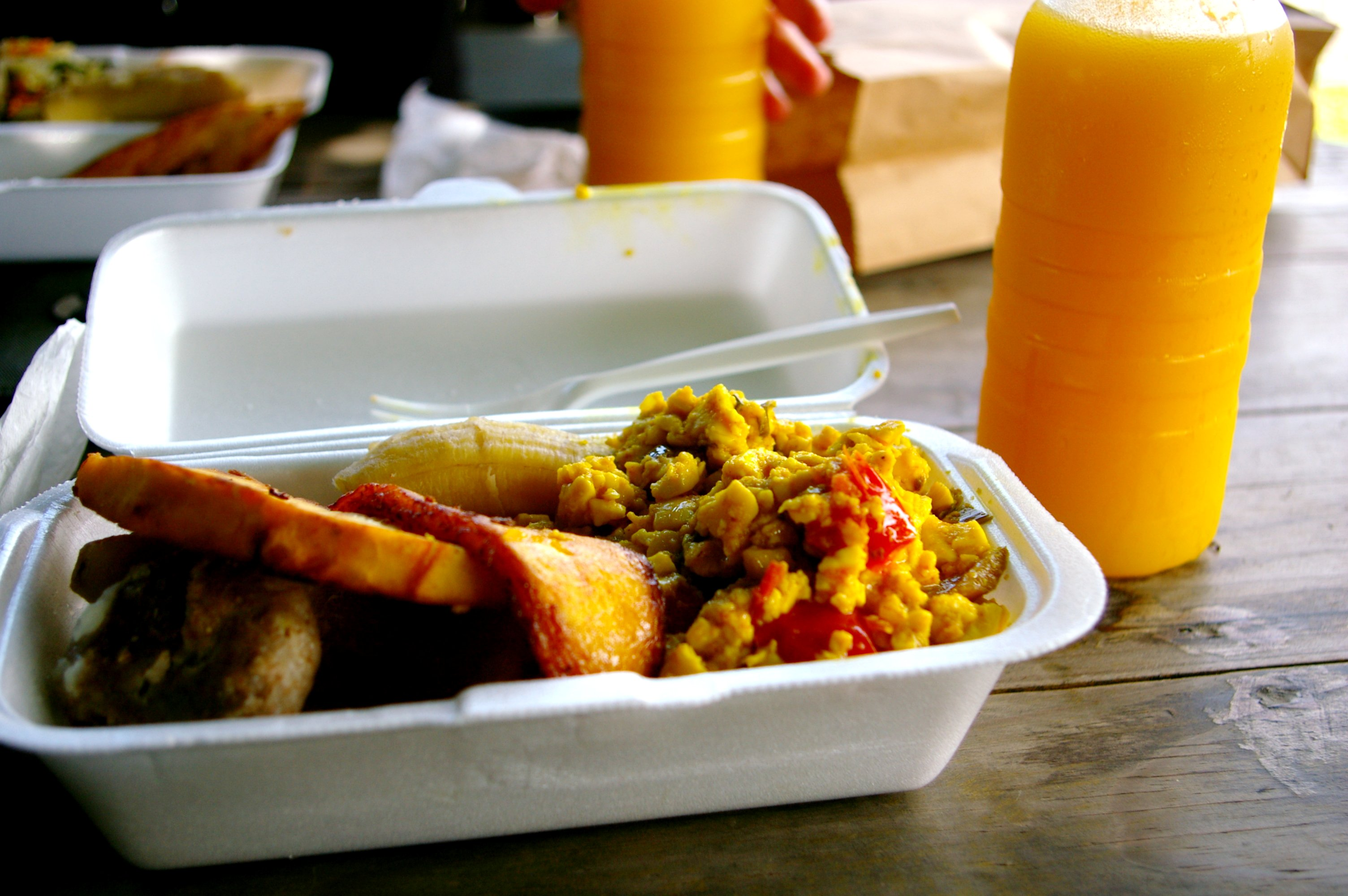
An ital breakfast; ackee, plantain, boiled food, breadfruit, and mango-pineapple juice

Rastas seek to produce food "naturally", eating what they call ital, or "natural" food, which is often grown organically. Most Rastas adhere to the dietary laws outlined in the Book of Leviticus, and thus avoid eating pork or crustaceans. Other Rastas remain vegetarian, or vegan, a practice stemming from their interpretation of Leviticus. (Note: Leviticus 11:41–42) Many also avoid the addition of additives, including sugar and salt, to their food. Some Rastas sell ital products commercially. Rasta dietary practices may be denigrated by non-Rastas; in Ghana for example, where food traditionally includes a high meat content, the Rastas' emphasis on vegetable produce has led to the saying that they "eat like sheep and goats".

Rastafarians typically avoid food produced by non-Rastas or from unknown sources. Rasta men refuse to eat food prepared by a menstruating woman; some will avoid food prepared by a woman at any time. Rastas also generally avoid alcohol, cigarettes, and hard drugs like heroin and cocaine, presenting these substances as unnatural and contrasting them with cannabis. Rastas also often avoid mainstream medicine and will reject surgery, injections, or blood transfusions. Instead, they use herbal medicine, especially teas and poultices, with cannabis often used as an ingredient.

=== Appearance ===
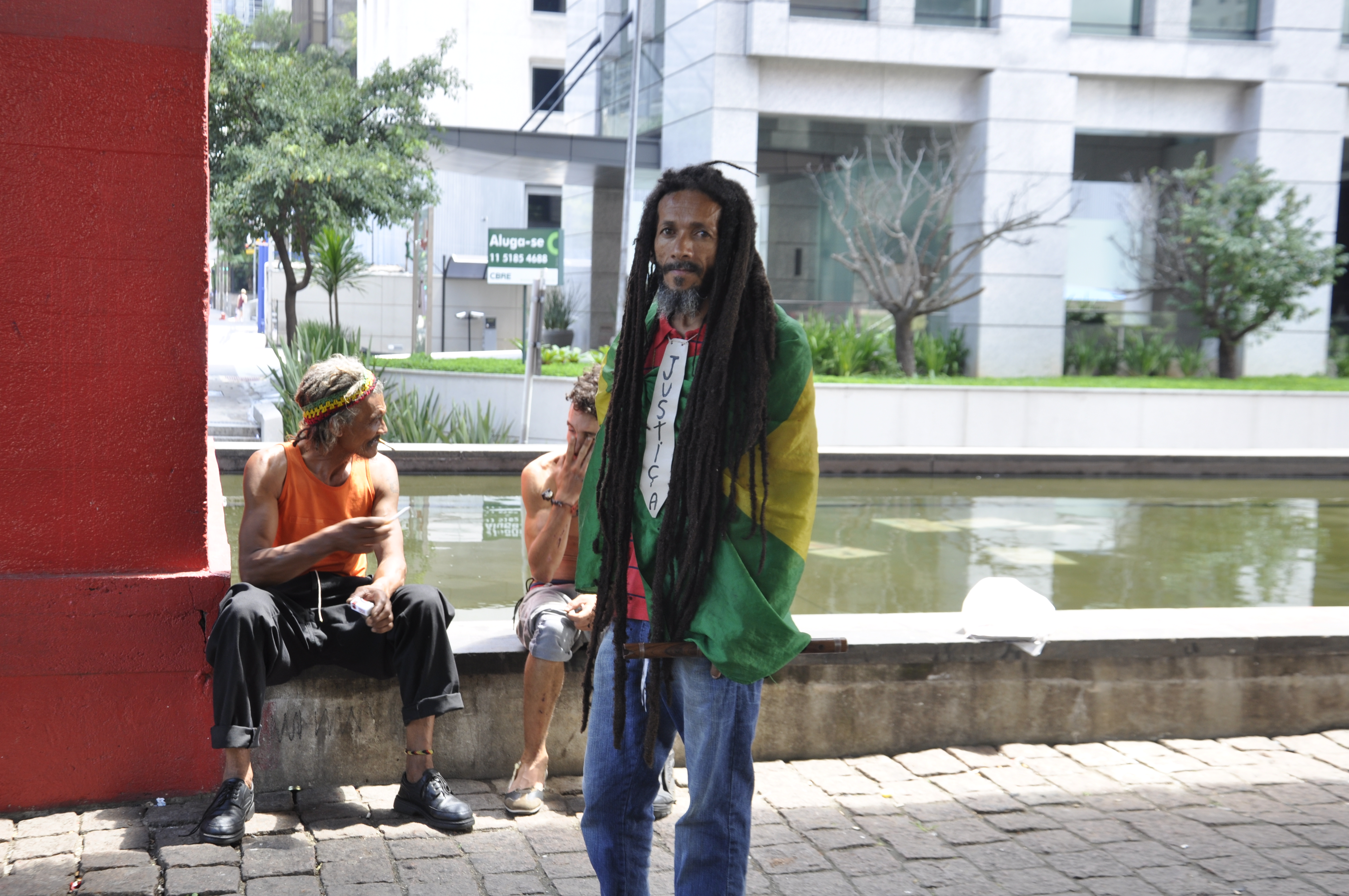
A man with dreadlocks in São Paulo, Brazil

Rastas use their physical appearance to visually distinguish themselves from non-Rastas. Many Rastas prefer to wear African styles of clothing, such as dashikis, with males often growing long beards. However, it is the formation of hair into dreadlocks that is one of the most recognisable Rasta symbols. Rastas believe that dreadlocks are promoted in the Bible, specifically in the Book of Numbers, (Note: Numbers 6:5–6) and regard them as a symbol of strength linked to the hair of the Biblical figure of Samson.

For Rastas, their dreadlocks mark their covenant with Jah, reflect their commitment to 'naturalness', and symbolically reject Babylon and its normative grooming aesthetics. Rastas are often critical of black people who straighten their hair, believing that it is an attempt to imitate white European hair and thus reflects alienation from a person's African identity. Sometimes this dreadlocked hair is then shaped and styled, often inspired by a lion's mane symbolising Haile Selassie, who is regarded as "the Conquering Lion of Judah".

Rastas differ on whether they regard dreadlocks as compulsory for practicing the religion. Some Rastas do not wear their hair in dreadlocks; within the religion they are often termed "cleanface" Rastas, with those wearing dreadlocked hair often called "locksmen". Some Rastas have also joined the Ethiopian Orthodox Tewahedo Church, the Christian organisation to which Haile Selassie belonged, and these individuals are forbidden from wearing dreadlocks by the Church. In reference to Rasta hairstyles, Rastas often refer to non-Rastas as "baldheads", or "combsome", while those who are new to Rastafari and who have only just started to grow their hair into dreads are termed "nubbies". Members of the Bobo Ashanti sect of Rastas conceal their dreadlocks within turbans, while some Rastas tuck their dreads under a rastacap or tam headdress, usually coloured green, red, black, and yellow. Dreadlocks and Rastafari-inspired clothing have also been worn for aesthetic reasons by non-Rastas, including many reggae musicians.

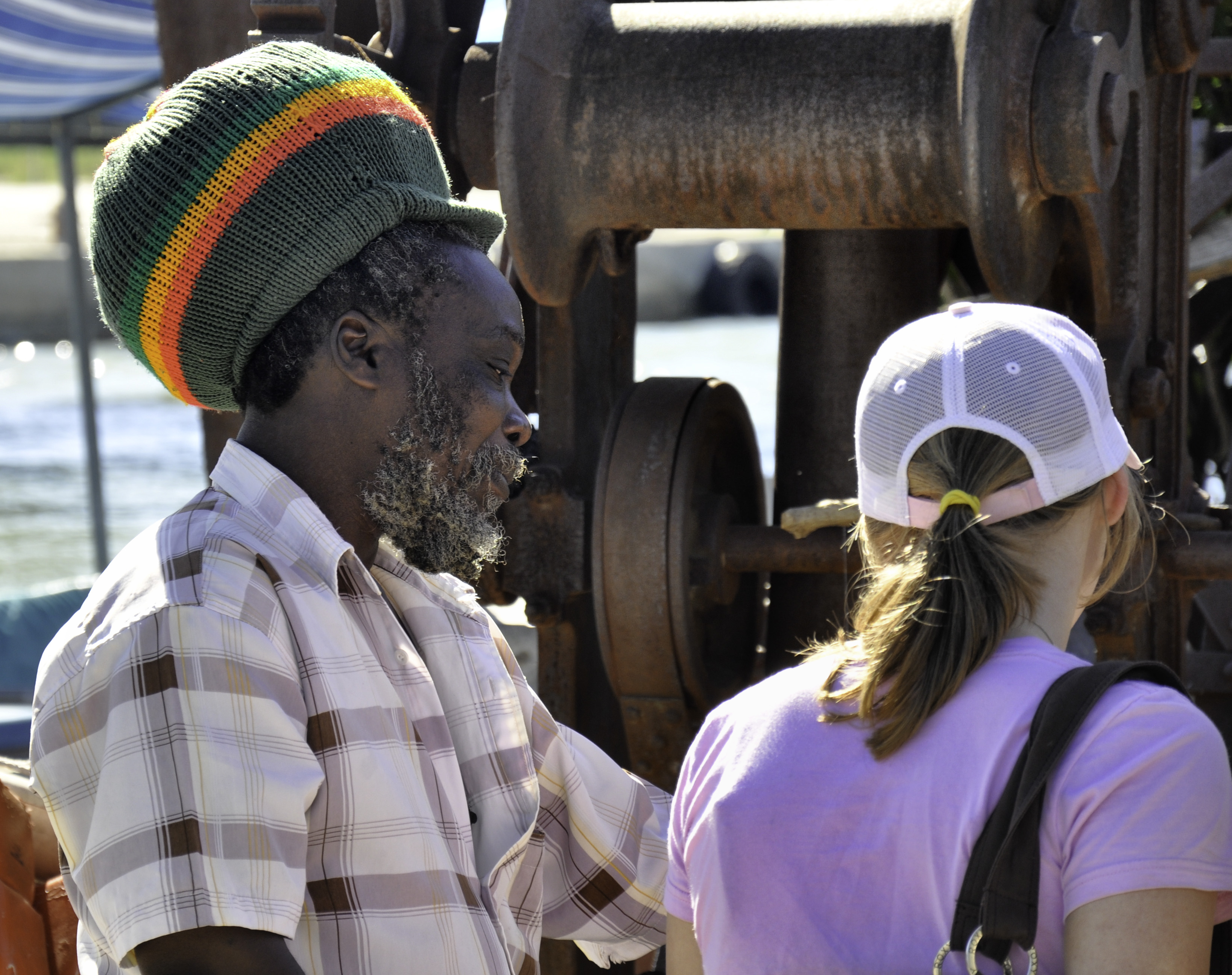
A Rasta man wearing a rastacap in Jamaica

From the beginning of the Rastafari movement in the 1930s, adherents typically grew beards and tall hair, perhaps in imitation of Haile Selassie. The wearing of hair as dreadlocks then emerged as a Rasta practice in the 1940s; there were debates within the movement as to whether dreadlocks should be worn or not, with proponents of the style becoming dominant. There are various claims as to how this practice was adopted. One claim is that it was adopted in imitation of certain African nations, such as the Maasai, Somalis, or Oromo, or that it was inspired by the hairstyles worn by some of those involved in the anti-colonialist Mau Mau Uprising in Kenya. An alternative explanation is that it was inspired by the hairstyles of Hindu sadhus.

The wearing of dreadlocks has contributed to negative views of Rastafari among non-Rastas, many of whom regard it as wild and unattractive. Dreadlocks remain socially stigmatised in many societies; in Ghana for example, they are often associated with the homeless and mentally ill, with such associations of marginality extending onto Ghanaian Rastas. In Jamaica during the mid-20th century, teachers and police officers used to forcibly cut off the dreads of Rastas. In various countries, Rastas have since won legal battles ensuring their right to wear dreadlocks: in 2020, for instance, the High Court of Malawi ruled that all public schools must allow their students to wear dreadlocks.

== History ==
Rastafari developed out of the legacy of the Atlantic slave trade, in which over ten million enslaved Africans were transported to the Americas between the 16th and 19th centuries. Under 700,000 of these slaves were settled in the British colony of Jamaica. The British government abolished slavery in the Caribbean island in 1834, although racial prejudice remained prevalent across Jamaican society.

=== Ethiopianism, Back to Africa, and Marcus Garvey ===
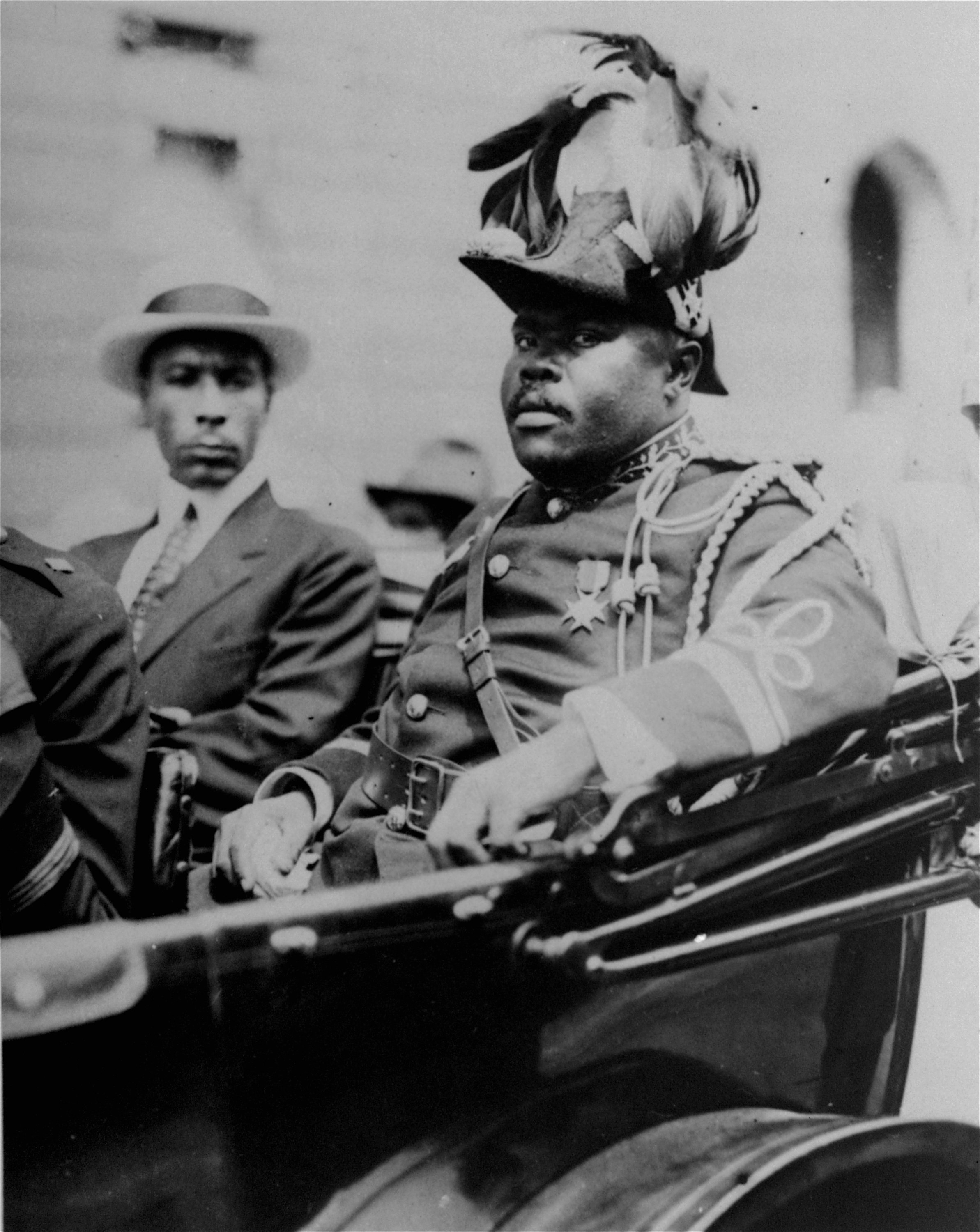
Marcus Garvey, a prominent black nationalist theorist who heavily influenced Rastafari and is regarded as a prophet by many Rastas

Rastafari owed much to intellectual frameworks from the 19th and early 20th centuries. A key influence was Christian Revivalism, with the Great Revival of 1860–61 drawing many Afro-Jamaicans to join churches. Increasing numbers of Pentecostal missionaries from the United States arrived in Jamaica during the early 20th century, climaxing in the 1920s.

Further contributing significantly to Rastafari's development were Ethiopianism and the Back to Africa ethos, both traditions with 18th-century roots. In the 19th century, there were growing calls for the African diaspora to be resettled in Africa, with some of this diaspora establishing colonies in Sierra Leone and Liberia. Based in Liberia, the black Christian preacher Edward Wilmot Blyden began promoting African pride and the preservation of African tradition and institutions. Also spreading throughout Africa was Ethiopianism, a movement that accorded special status to Ethiopia because it was mentioned in various Biblical passages. For adherents of Ethiopianism, "Ethiopia" was often a synonym for Africa as a whole.

Of significant influence on Rastafari was the Jamaican activist Marcus Garvey, who spent much of his adult life in the US and Britain. Garvey supported the idea of global racial separatism and called for part of the African diaspora to relocate to Africa. As a mass movement, Garveyism declined in the Great Depression of the 1930s. A rumour later spread that in 1916, Garvey had called on his supporters to "look to Africa" for the crowning of a black king. This quote was never verified, although in August 1930 Garvey had showcased a play about the crowning of a fictional Sudanese king. Rastas hold Garvey in great esteem, often regarding him as a prophet. Garvey knew of Rastafari, but took a largely negative view of the religion; he also became a critic of Haile Selassie, calling him "a great coward" who rules a "country where black men are chained and flogged".

=== Haile Selassie and the early Rastas: 1930–1949 ===
Haile Selassie was crowned Emperor of Ethiopia in 1930, becoming the first sovereign monarch crowned in Sub-Saharan Africa since 1891 and first Christian one since 1889. Several Jamaican Christian clergymen claimed that Selassie's coronation was evidence that he was a black messiah prophesied in the Book of Revelation, (Note: Revelation 5:2–3; Revelation 19:16) the Book of Daniel, (Note: Daniel 7:3) and Psalms. (Note: Psalms 68:31) Over the following years, several street preachers—most notably Leonard Howell, Archibald Dunkley, Robert Hinds, and Joseph Hibbert—began claiming that Haile Selassie was the returned Jesus. They first did so in Kingston, and soon the message spread throughout 1930s Jamaica, especially among poor communities hit hard by the Great Depression. Clarke stated that "to all intents and purposes this was the beginning" of Rastafari.

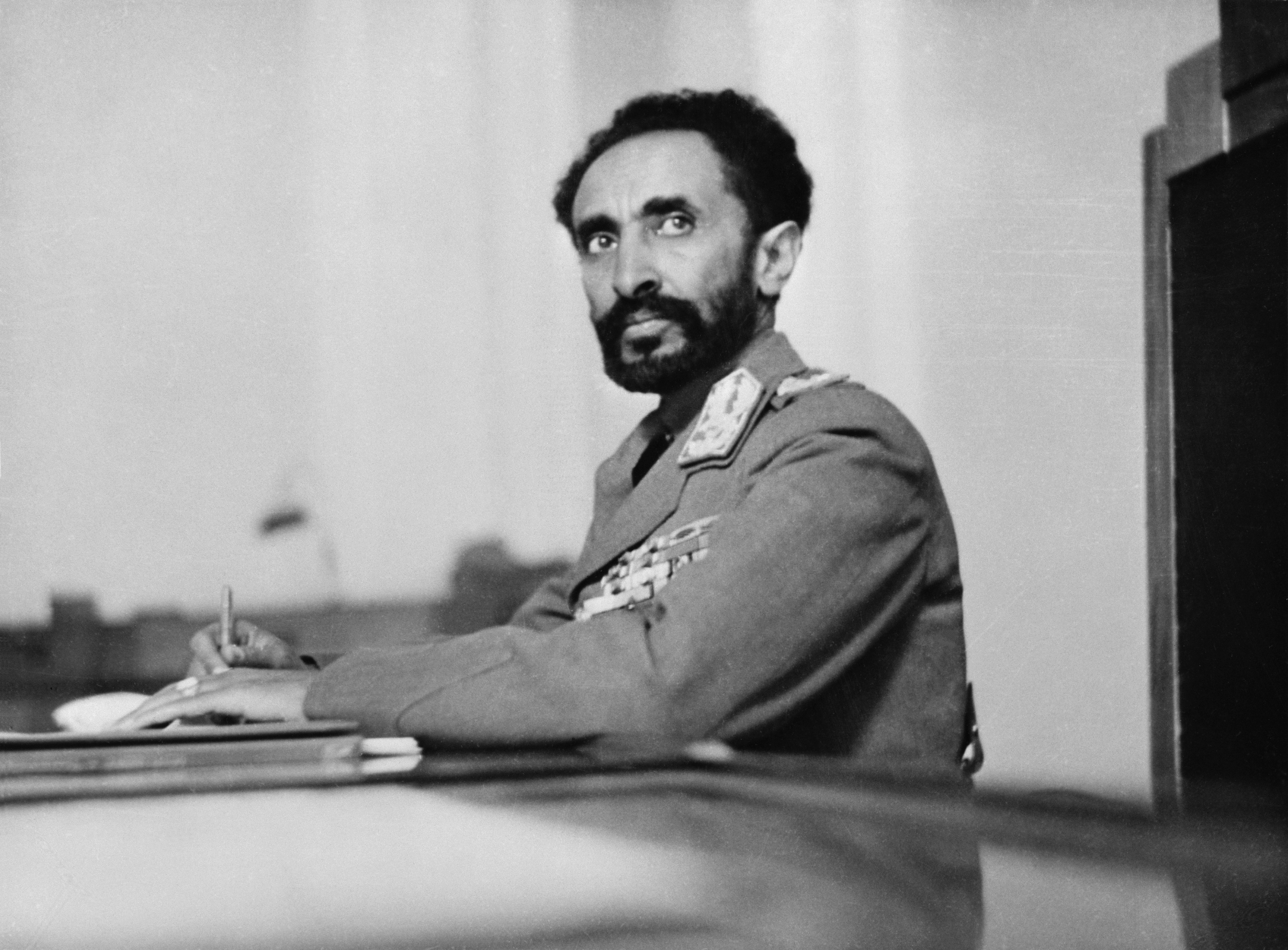
Emperor Haile Selassie in 1942, a year after he re-took control of Ethiopia

Howell was the early movement's leading figure. He preached that black Africans were superior to white Europeans and that Afro-Jamaicans should owe their allegiance to Haile Selassie rather than to King George V. Jamaica's colonial authorities arrested him and charged him with sedition in 1934, resulting in a two-year imprisonment. Following his release, Howell established the Ethiopian Salvation Society and in 1939 formed a Rasta community, known as Pinnacle, in Saint Catherine Parish. Jamaica's police feared that Howell was plotting an armed rebellion and raided Pinnacle repeatedly. Pinnacle ultimately closed in 1954 and Howell was committed to a mental hospital.

In 1936, Italy invaded and occupied Ethiopia, forcing Haile Selassie into exile. The invasion brought international condemnation and led to growing sympathy for the Ethiopian cause. In 1937, Selassie created the Ethiopian World Federation, which established a branch in Jamaica later that decade. In 1941, Allied forces drove the Italians out of Ethiopia and Selassie returned to reclaim his throne. Many Rastas interpreted this as the fulfilment of a prophecy from the Book of Revelation. (Note: Revelation 19:11–19)

=== Growing visibility: 1950–1969 ===
During the 1950s, Rastafari grew rapidly in Jamaica and spread to other Caribbean islands, the United States, and Britain. However, for its first thirty years, Rastafari had a conflictual relationship with Jamaica's authorities, which Rastas typically regarded as instruments of Babylon. Police often arrested Rastas for cannabis possession, and backlash against the movement grew after a practitioner allegedly killed a woman in 1957. A more militant brand of Rastafari had emerged in the 1940s and 1950s, the vanguard of which was the West Kingston-based House of Youth Black Faith. In 1958—following the first Rastafarian Universal Convention, held in Back-o-Wall, Kingston—Rasta militants unsuccessfully tried to capture the city in the name of Haile Selassie. Later that year they tried again in Spanish Town. The increased militancy of some Rastas generated growing social alarm. Another prominent clash between Rastas and law enforcement was the Coral Gardens incident of 1963, which led to several deaths. Clamping down on the movement, in 1964 Jamaica's government implemented tougher laws surrounding cannabis use.

During the 1960s, Jamaica's Rasta community underwent a process of routinisation. The decade saw Rastafari develop in increasingly complex ways, for instance with some Rastas arguing for mental decolonisation rather than a physical return to Africa. Although its early membership was predominantly from poorer sectors of society, the 1960s saw Rastafari attracting support from more privileged groups, like students and professional musicians. The late 1960s also saw the formation of the Rastafarian Movement Association's Rasta Voice, the first official Rastafari newspaper. At the invitation of its government, Haile Selassie visited Jamaica in April 1966, with thousands of Rastas amassing to see his arrival at the airport. Many Rastas came under the influence of the Guyanese black nationalist academic Walter Rodney, who lectured to their community in 1968 before publishing his thoughts as the pamphlet Groundings. Like Rodney, many Jamaican Rastas were influenced by the U.S.-based Black Power movement, and after that movement declined, Rastafari filled the vacuum it left for many black youth.

=== International spread and decline: 1970–present ===
In the mid-1970s, reggae's international popularity exploded. The most successful reggae artist, Bob Marley, played a major role in introducing Rastafari themes to audiences across the world. Reggae's popularity led to a growth in "pseudo-Rastafarians", individuals who listened to reggae and wore Rasta clothing but did not share its belief system. Many Rastas were angered by this, believing it commercialised their religion.

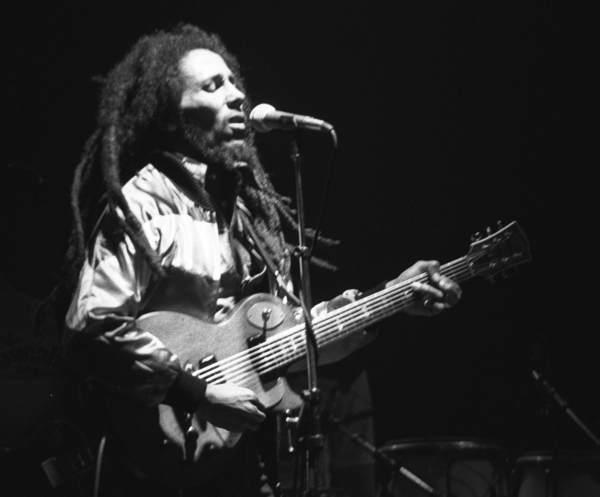
Reggae musician Bob Marley did much to raise international awareness of the Rastafari movement in the 1970s.

Through reggae, Rasta musicians became increasingly important in Jamaica's political life during the 1970s. To bolster his popularity, Jamaican Prime Minister Michael Manley employed Rasta imagery and courted support from Marley and other reggae musicians. Manley described Rastas as a "beautiful and remarkable people" and carried a cane which he claimed was a gift from Haile Selassie. Following Manley's example, Jamaican political parties increasingly employed Rasta language, symbols, and reggae references in their campaigns, while Rasta symbols became increasingly mainstream in Jamaican society. This helped to confer greater legitimacy on Rastafari, with reggae and Rasta imagery being increasingly presented as a core part of Jamaica's cultural heritage for the growing tourist industry. In the 1980s, a Rasta, Barbara Makeda Blake Hannah, became a senator in Jamaica's Parliament.

Enthusiasm for Rastafari was dampened by Haile Selassie's death in 1975 and then Marley's in 1981. During the 1980s, the number of Rastas in Jamaica declined, with Pentecostal and other Charismatic Christian groups proving more successful at attracting young recruits. Several prominent Rastas converted to Christianity, and two of those who did so—Judy Mowatt and Tommy Cowan—maintained that Marley had converted to Christianity, in the form of the Ethiopian Orthodox Church, during his final days. From the 1990s, there was growing political organisation among Jamaican Rastas, reflected in campaigns to legalise campaigns and the formation of small political parties that failed to attain more than minimal electoral support. In 1995, Jamaica's Rastafari Centralization Organization was established in an attempt to organise the Rastafari community.

== Organisation ==
Rastafari is not a homogeneous movement and has no single administrative structure, nor any single leader. Most Rastas avoid centralised and hierarchical structures because they do not want to replicate the structures of Babylon and because their religion's individualist ethos places emphasis on inner divinity. The structure of most Rastafari groups is less like that of Christian denominations and is instead akin to the cellular structure of other African diasporic traditions like Haitian Vodou, Cuban Santería, and Jamaica's Revival Zion. Since the 1970s, there have been attempts to unify all Rastas, namely through the Rastafari Movement Association, which sought political mobilisation. In 1982, the first international assembly of Rastafari groups took place in Toronto, Canada. This and subsequent international conferences, assemblies, and workshops have helped to cement global networks and cultivate an international community of Rastas.

=== Mansions of Rastafari ===
A stylised Rastafari motif, depicting the Lion of Judah

Sub-divisions of Rastafari are often referred to as "houses" or "mansions", in keeping with a passage from the Gospel of John (14:2): Jesus states, "In my father's house are many mansions". The three most prominent branches are the House of Nyabinghi, the Bobo Ashanti, and the Twelve Tribes of Israel, although other important groups include the Church of Haile Selassie I Inc., and the Fulfilled Rastafari. By fragmenting into different houses without any single leader, Rastafari became more resilient during the movement's early decades.

Probably the largest Rastafari group, the House of Nyabinghi is an aggregate of more traditional and militant Rastas who seek to keep the movement close to its 1940s form. They stress the idea that Haile Selassie was Jah and the reincarnation of Jesus. Dreadlocks are deemed essential and patriarchal gender roles are strongly emphasised. According to Cashmore, writing in 1983, they are "vehemently anti-white". Nyabinghi Rastas refuse to compromise with Babylon and are often critical of reggae musicians for collaborating with the commercial music industry.

The Bobo Ashanti sect was founded in Jamaica by Emanuel Charles Edwards through the establishment of his Ethiopia Africa Black International Congress (EABIC) in 1958. The group established a commune in Bull Bay, where they were led by Edwards until his death in 1994. The group hold to a highly rigid ethos; Edwards advocated a new trinity, with Haile Selassie as the living God, himself as the Christ, and Garvey as the prophet. Male members divide into two categories: the "priests" who conduct religious services and the "prophets" who take part in reasoning sessions. It places greater restrictions on women than most other forms of Rastafari; women are regarded as impure because of menstruation and childbirth and so are not permitted to cook for men. The group teaches that black Africans are God's chosen people and are superior to white Europeans, with members often refusing to associate with white people. By the early 21st century, the Bobo Ashanti had become more welcoming of outsiders, even those who are menstruating. Bobo Ashanti Rastas are recognisable by their long, flowing robes and turbans.

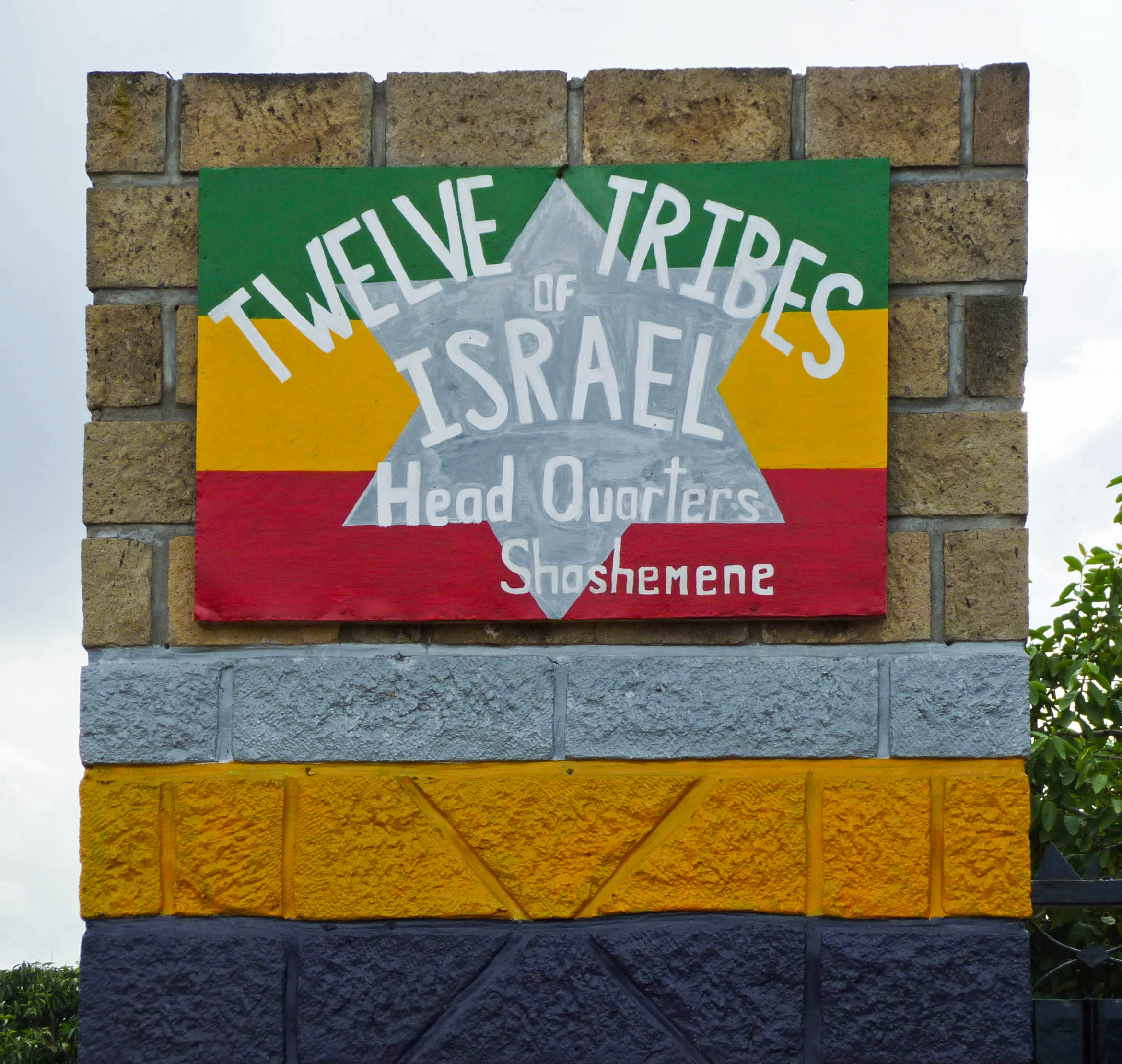
The headquarters of the Twelve Tribes of Israel group in Shashemene, Ethiopia

The Twelve Tribes of Israel group was founded in Kingston by Vernon Carrington in 1968. He proclaimed himself the reincarnation of the Old Testament prophet Gad and his followers call him "Prophet Gad", "Brother Gad", or "Gadman". It is commonly regarded as the most liberal form of Rastafari and the closest to Christianity. Practitioners are often dubbed "Christian Rastas" because they believe Jesus is the only saviour; Haile Selassie is important but not deemed the Second Coming. The group divides its members into twelve groups according to which Hebrew calendar month they were born in; each month is associated with a particular colour, body part, and mental function. Maintaining dreadlocks and an Ital diet are considered commendable but not essential, while adherents are called upon to read a chapter of the Bible each day. Membership is open to individuals of any racial background.

The Twelve Tribes peaked in popularity during the 1970s, when it attracted artists, musicians, and many middle-class followers—Marley among them—resulting in the terms "middle-class Rastas" and "uptown Rastas" being applied to members of the group. Carrington died in 2005, since which time the Twelve Tribes of Israel have been led by an executive council. The council includes an equal number of men and women. As of 2010, it was recorded as being the largest of the centralised Rasta groups. It remains headquartered in Kingston, although also has followers outside Jamaica; the group was responsible for establishing the Rasta community in Shashamane, Ethiopia.

The Church of Haile Selassie, Inc., was founded by Abuna Foxe and operated much like a mainstream Christian church, with a hierarchy of functionaries, weekly services, and Sunday schools. In adopting this broad approach, the Church seeks to develop Rastafari's respectability in wider society. Fulfilled Rastafari is a multi-ethnic movement that has spread in popularity during the 21st century, in large part through the Internet. The Fulfilled Rastafari group accepts Haile Selassie's statements that he was a man and that he was a devout Christian, and so places emphasis on worshipping Jesus through the example set forth by Haile Selassie. The wearing of dreadlocks and the adherence to an ital diet are considered issues up to the individual.

== Demographics ==
Born in the ghettos of Kingston, Jamaica, the Rastafarian movement has captured the imagination of thousands of black youth, and some white youth, throughout Jamaica, the Caribbean, Britain, France, and other countries in Western Europe and North America. It is also to be found in smaller numbers in parts of Africa—for example, in Ethiopia, Ghana, and Senegal—and in Australia and New Zealand, particularly among the Maori.

— Sociologist of religion Peter B. Clarke, 1986

As of 2012, there were an estimated 700,000 to 1,000,000 Rastas worldwide. They are found in many regions, including most major population centres. Men dominate Rastafari. In its early years, most of its followers were men, and the women who did adhere to it tended to remain in the background. This picture of Rastafari's demographics has been confirmed by ethnographic studies conducted in the late 20th and early 21st centuries.

Rastafari's social influence has been more substantial than its numerical size, particularly in fostering a racial, political, and cultural consciousness among the African diaspora and Africans themselves. The Rasta message resonates with many people who feel marginalised and alienated by their society's values and institutions. Internationally, it has proved most popular among the poor and among marginalised youth. In valorising Africa and blackness, Rastafari provides a positive identity for youth in the African diaspora by allowing them to psychologically reject their social stigmatisation. It then provides these disaffected people with the discursive stance from which they can challenge capitalism and consumerism, providing them with symbols of resistance and defiance. Cashmore expressed the view that "whenever there are black people who sense an injust disparity between their own material conditions and those of the whites who surround them and tend to control major social institutions, the Rasta messages have relevance."

=== Conversion and deconversion ===
Rastafari is a non-missionary religion. However, elders from Jamaica often go "trodding" to instruct new converts in the fundamentals of the religion. On researching English Rastas during the 1970s, Cashmore noted that they had not converted instantly, but rather had undergone "a process of drift" through which they gradually adopted Rasta beliefs and practices, resulting in their ultimate acceptance of Haile Selassie's central importance. Based on his research in West Africa, Neil J. Savishinsky found that many of those who converted to Rastafari came to the religion through their pre-existing recreational use of marijuana.

Rastas often claim that—rather than converting to the religion—they were actually always a Rasta and that their embrace of its beliefs was merely the realisation of this. There is no formal ritual carried out to mark an individual's entry into Rastafari, although once they join an individual often changes their name, with many including the prefix "Ras". Rastas regard themselves as an exclusive and elite community, membership of which is restricted to those possessing the "insight" to recognise Haile Selassie's importance. Practitioners thus often regard themselves as the "enlightened ones" who have "seen the light". Many of them see no point in establishing good relations with non-Rastas, believing that the latter will never accept Rastafari doctrine as truth.

Some Rastas have left the religion. Clarke noted that among British Rastas, some returned to Pentecostalism and other forms of Christianity, while others embraced Islam or no religion. Some English ex-Rastas described disillusionment when the societal transformation promised by Rastafari failed to appear; others felt that while Rastafari would be appropriate for agrarian communities in Africa and the Caribbean, it was not suited to industrialised British society. Others experienced disillusionment after concluding that Haile Selassie had been an oppressive leader of the Ethiopian people. Cashmore found that some British Rastas who had more militant views left the religion after finding its focus on reasoning and music insufficient for the struggle against white domination and racism.

=== Regional spread ===
Although it remains most concentrated in the Caribbean, Rastafari has spread to many areas of the world and adapted into many localised variants. It has spread primarily in Anglophone regions and countries, largely because reggae music has primarily been produced in the English language. It is thus most commonly found in the Anglophone Caribbean, United States, Canada, United Kingdom, Australia and New Zealand, and Anglophone parts of Africa.

==== Jamaica and the Americas ====
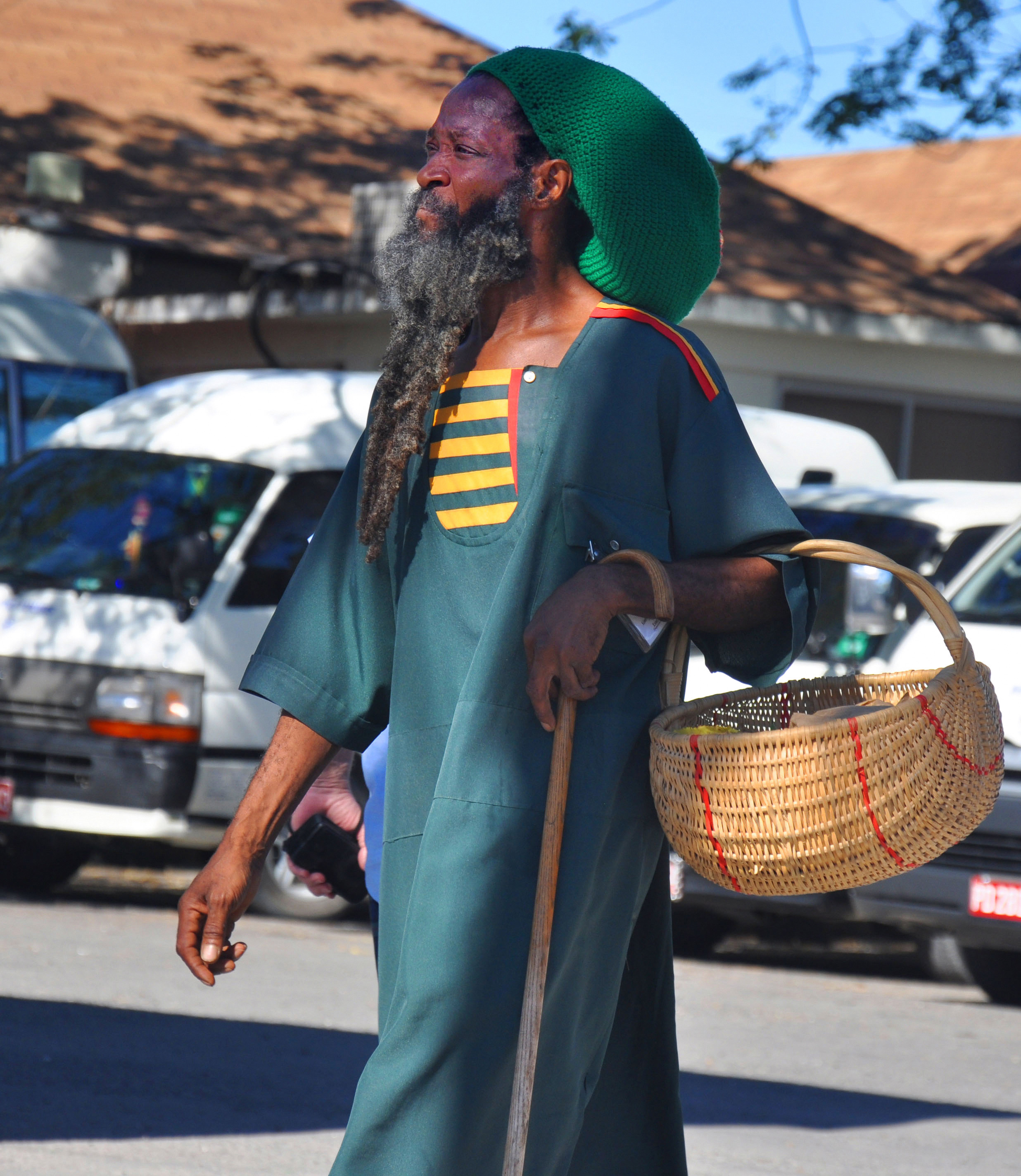
A practitioner of Rastafari in Jamaica

In the mid-1980s, there were approximately 70,000 members and sympathisers of Rastafari in Jamaica. Most were male, working-class, former Christians aged between 18 and 40. In the 2011 Jamaican census, 29,026 individuals identified as Rastas. Jamaica's Rastas were initially entirely from the Afro-Jamaican majority, and although Afro-Jamaicans are still the majority, Rastafari has also gained members from the island's Chinese, Indian, Afro-Chinese, Afro-Jewish, mulatto, and white minorities. Until 1965, the vast majority were from the lower classes, although it has since attracted many middle-class members; by the 1980s, there were Jamaican Rastas working as lawyers and university professors. Jamaica is often valorised by Rastas as the fountain-head of their faith, and many Rastas living elsewhere travel to the island on pilgrimage.

Both through travel between the islands, and through reggae's popularity, Rastafari spread across the eastern Caribbean during the 1970s. Here, its ideas complemented the anti-colonial and Afrocentric views prevalent in countries like Trinidad, Grenada, Dominica, and St Vincent. Here, early Rastas often engaged in political movements to a greater extent than their Jamaican counterparts. Rastas were involved in Grenada's 1979 New Jewel Movement and were given positions in the Grenadine government until it was overthrown in 1983. Although Cuba's Marxist–Leninist government generally discouraged foreign influences, Rastafari was introduced there alongside reggae in the 1970s. Foreign Rastas studying in Cuba during the 1990s connected with its reggae scene and helped to further ground it in Rasta beliefs. In Cuba, most Rastas have been male and from the Afro-Cuban population.

Jamaican migrants took Rastafari to the United States and Canada in the 1960s and 1970s. American police were often suspicious of Rastas and regarded Rastafari as a criminal sub-culture. Rastafari attracted converts within several Native American communities, also picking up support from white members of the hippie subculture. In Latin America, small communities of Rastas have also established in Brazil, Panama, and Nicaragua.

==== Beyond the Americas ====
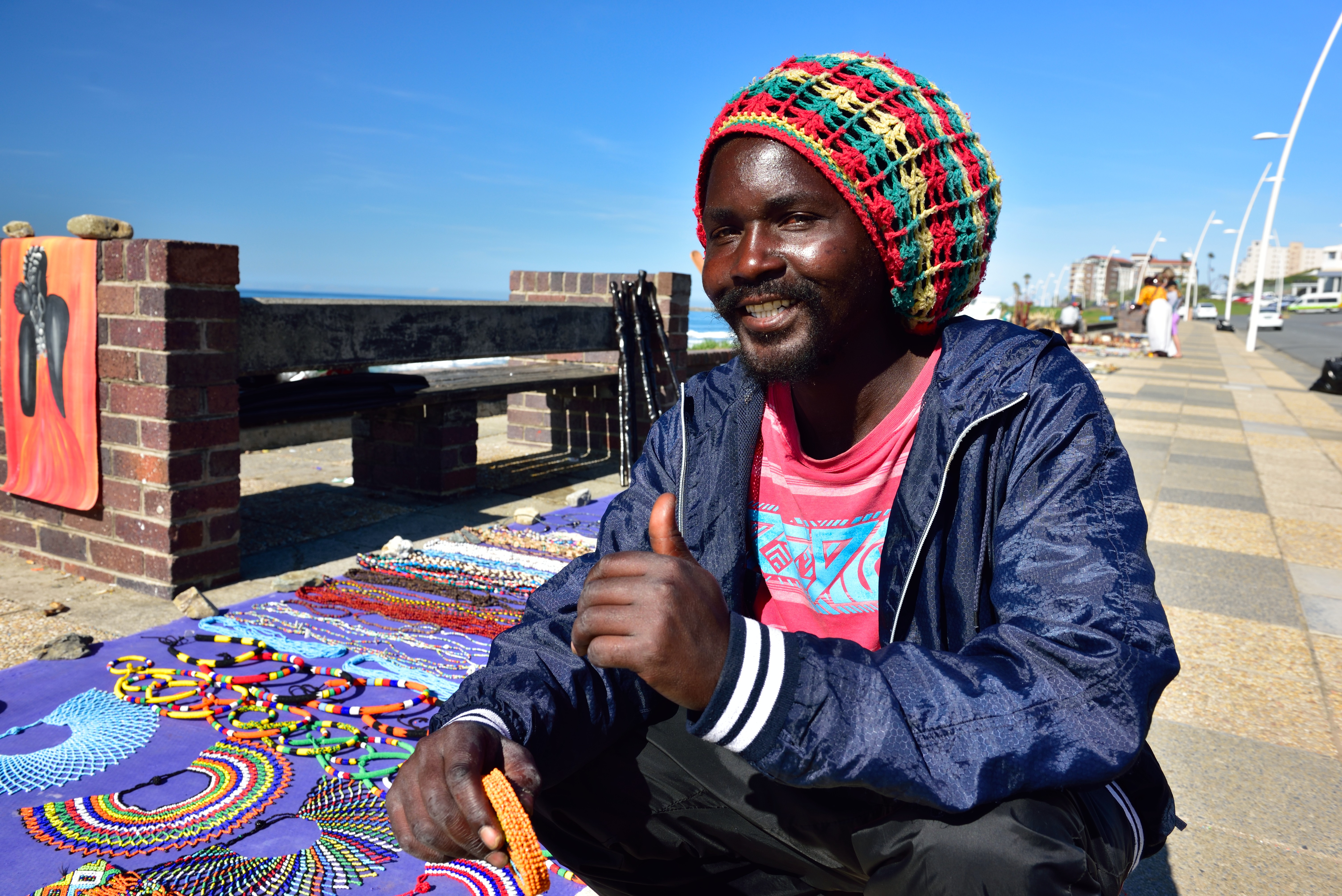
A Rasta street vendor in South Africa's Eastern Cape

Some Rastas in the African diaspora followed through with their beliefs about resettlement in Africa, with Ghana and Nigeria being particularly favoured. Caribbean Rastas first arrived in Ghana during the 1960s, with reggae later contributing to the popularisation of Rastafari in West Africa. In the region, it is more common in Anglophone rather their Francophone countries. Small groups have established in Muslim-majority parts of West Africa like Gambia and Senegal. West African Rastas have reported problems; Ghanaian practitioners often complain of social ostracism and prosecution for cannabis possession, with non-Rastas often deeming them "too Western" and "not African enough".

In the 1960s, a Rasta settlement was established in Shashamane, Ethiopia, on land made available by Haile Selassie's Ethiopian World Federation. The community faced many problems; 500 acres were confiscated by the Marxist government of Mengistu Haile Mariam. There were also conflicts with local Ethiopians, who largely regarded the incoming Rastas, and their Ethiopian-born children, as foreigners. The Shashamane community peaked at a population of 2,000, although subsequently declined to around 200.

By the early 1990s, a Rasta community existed in Nairobi, Kenya, whose approach to the religion was informed both by reggae and by traditional Kikuyu religion. Rastafari groups have also appeared in Zimbabwe, Malawi, and South Africa; in 2008, there were at least 12,000 Rastas in the latter country. At an African Union/Caribbean Diaspora conference in South Africa in 2005, a statement was released characterising Rastafari as a force for integration of Africa and the African diaspora.

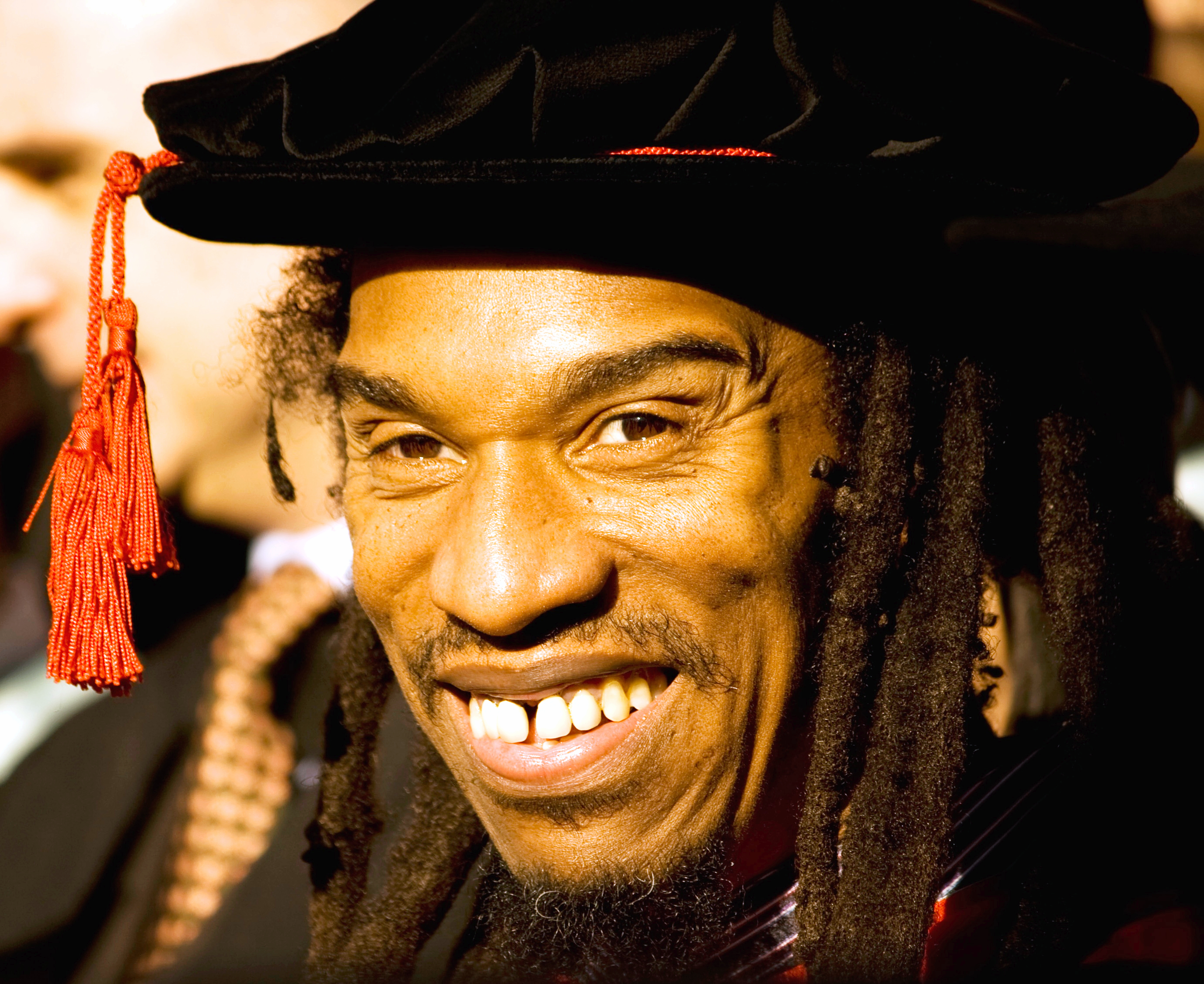
The English Rasta Benjamin Zephaniah was a well-known poet.

During the 1950s and 1960s, Rastas were among the thousands of Caribbean migrants who settled in the United Kingdom, creating small communities in areas of London. By the late 1960s, Rastafari had attracted converts from the second generation of British Caribbean people, spreading to cities like Birmingham, Leicester, Liverpool, Manchester, and Bristol. According to the 2001 United Kingdom Census there are about 5000 Rastafari living in England and Wales. Clarke described Rastafari as a small but "extremely influential" component of black British life. Rastafari also emerged in certain continental European countries, including the Netherlands, France, Germany, and Ukraine.

Rastafari attracted membership from within the Maori population of New Zealand, and the Aboriginal population of Australia. Rastafari has also established a presence in Japan, including a small rural community of Rasta musicians in Yoshino. Rastafari is also established in Israel, primarily among those highlighting similarities between Judaism and Rastafari.

== See also ==
- List of Rastafarians
