= Ital =

Food celebrated in the Rastafari movement

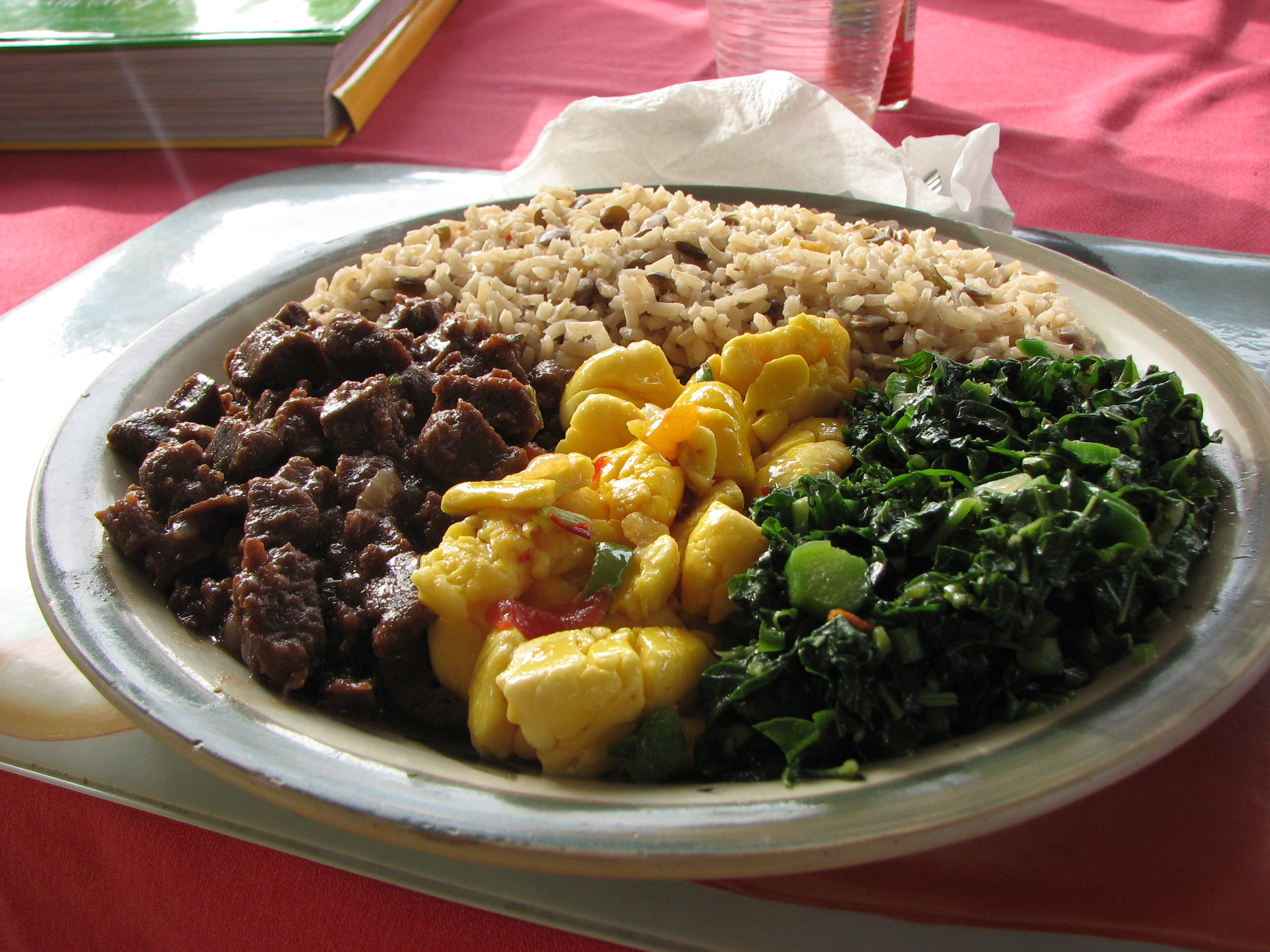
A Jamaican ital meal including callaloo, ackee, and Jamaican veggie chunks

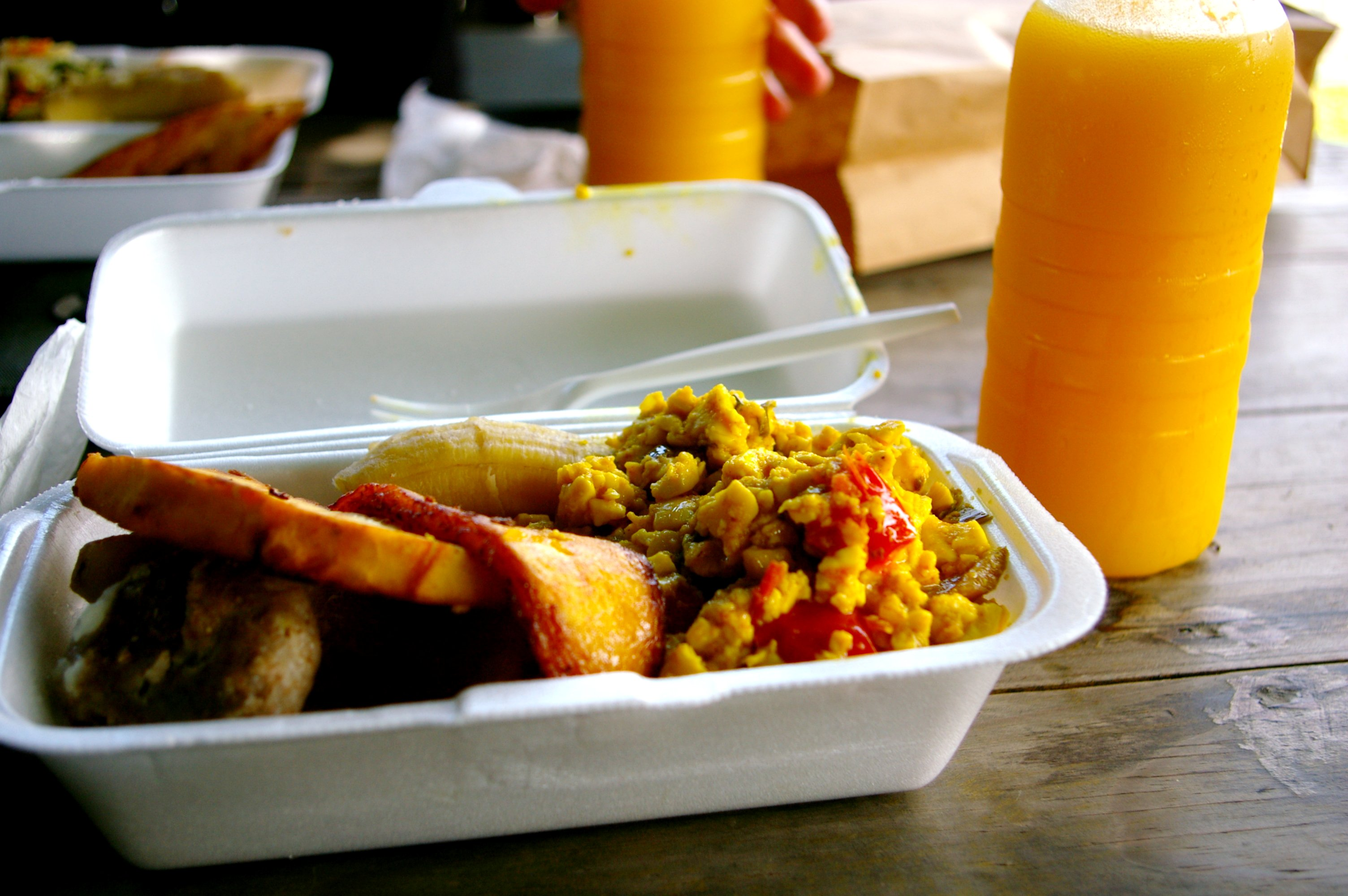
A Jamaican ital breakfast including breadfruit, a plantain, and mango-pineapple juice

Ital, also spelled I-tal (/ˈaɪtɑːl/), is food often celebrated by those in the Rastafari movement. It is compulsory in the Bobo Ashanti and Nyabinghi mansions, though not in the Twelve Tribes of Israel. The word derives from the English word "vital", with the initial "v" removed. This emphasis on the letter "I" is done to many words in the Rastafari vocabulary to signify the unity of the speaker with God and all of nature. The expression of Ital eating varies widely from Rasta to Rasta, and there are few universal rules of Ital living.

The primary goal of adhering to an Ital diet is to increase liveliness. The life energy that Rastafari generally believe lives within all human beings, as conferred from the Almighty, is referred to as Livity. A common tenet of Rastafari beliefs is the sharing of a central Livity among living things, and what is put into one's body should enhance Livity rather than reduce it. Though there are different interpretations of ital regarding specific foods, the general principle is that food should be natural, or pure, and directly from the earth; Rastafari therefore often avoid food which is chemically modified or contains artificial additives (e.g., colour, flavourings, and preservatives). Some also avoid added salt in foods, especially salt with the artificial addition of iodine, while pure sea or kosher salt is eaten by some. In strict interpretations, foods that have been produced using chemicals such as pesticides and fertilizer are not considered ital. Early adherents adopted their dietary laws based on their interpretation of several books of the Bible, including the Book of Genesis ("Then God said, 'I give you every seed-bearing plant on the face of the whole earth and every tree that has fruit with seed in it. They will be yours for food'. (Genesis 1:29)), the books of Leviticus and Deuteronomy. Along with growing dreadlocks and the sacramental smoking of ganja, observing a vegetarian diet is one of the practices early Rastafari adopted from Indian indentured servants living in Jamaica. Rastafari's founder, Leonard Howell, affectionately called "Gong" and "Gyangunguru Maragh", though not of Indian descent, was fascinated with Hindu practices and was instrumental in promoting a plant-based diet in the Rastafari community of Pinnacle.

== Vegetarianism ==
Most expressions of the Ital diet include adherence to a strict vegetarian diet. This is based in part on the belief that since meat is dead, eating it would therefore work against Livity elevation. It is also practiced because as adherents to natural living, Rastafarians often believe the human being is a natural vegetarian based on human physiology and anatomy. Some adherents to Ital diets are vegans, as they do not consider dairy to be natural for human consumption either. Despite most adherents being vegetarian, some consider fish to be acceptable.

== Drugs ==
Rastafari does not approve of alcohol consumption. However, some choose to drink alcohol in moderation as long as it does not reach a level that clouds the mind or reduces their livity. Most Rastas disapprove of cigarettes due to the serious health concerns associated with their use, and some avoid coffee and other caffeinated beverages (though this is less common). Some Rastafari grow their own coffee, sugar, and cocoa.

== Other restrictions ==
The strictest interpretations also avoid the consumption of rock salt (sea salt can be substituted), and food that has been preserved by canning or drying, and even prohibit the use of metal cooking utensils. In this case, only clay and wood cooking pots, crockery, and cutlery are used. Few adherents of ital follow the strictest interpretation; some Rastafarians do not adhere to them at all.

== See also ==
- Christian vegetarianism
- Kashrut
- Sattvic diet
- Halal
- Jewish vegetarianism
- List of diets
- Taboo food and drink
