= Bobo Ashanti =

Ethiopian African Black International Congress

The Bobo Ashanti (also variously called Bobo Shanti and Bobo Shanty), also known as the Ethiopian African Black International Congress (E.A.B.I.C.), is a religious group originating in Bull Bay near Kingston, Jamaica.

The Bobo Ashanti are one of the strictest Mansions of Rastafari. They cover their dreadlocks with bright turbans and wear long robes and can usually be distinguished from other Rastafari members because of this. While some Nyabinghi and Twelve Tribes of Israel Rastas drink wine and are either vegetarians or omnivores (eating plants, animals, and fungi), the Bobo Ashanti are all strictly ital and stick to the biblical restrictions regarding their vow; they also add extra restrictions to their diet, e.g. they do not eat mangoes or sugarcane. Twice each week and on the first Sunday of every month, the Bobos fast. Almost all songs and tributes within the community end with the phrase "Holy Emmanuel I Selassie I Jah Rastafari." "I" symbolizes unity. Bobo Ashanti do smoke marijuana like the other mansions of Rastafari, but do not do so in public because it is a sacred practice to be done at times of worship. Even though it is the "holy herb", production is not allowed in the Bobo Shanti commune as marijuana used to be illegal in Jamaica, although it is now legal for use by Rastafari.

== Origin ==
The Bobo Ashanti ("Bobo" meaning "wrap" or "tie" from the Twi word Abotire meaning crown the verb abo - to tie singular; bobo plural); and "Ashanti" in reference to the Ashanti people of Ghana, were founded by Emmanuel Charles Edwards (known as "Black Christ in the Flesh") in 1958 during the period known as the "groundation", where many protests took place calling for repatriation of African descendants and slaves to Kingston. Emmanuel Charles Edwards was the leader of the protests who was to be called King when he was badly beaten by authorities for his action. After this event, he formed the mansion of Bobo Ashanti as a separatist movement from those who did not strictly follow the principles of Rastafari. He established the first Bobo Ashanti community in Kingston, which then settled in Bull Bay, where most of the members live today. The Bobo Ashanti consider their mansion to be the "Priesthood Order" of Rastafari, as they hold the most radical theology and offer theological training and accreditation. Those who become priests, prophets, or Empresses are to abide by EABIC principles in their home country. The community in Bull Bay is very tight knit and a place of refuge for poor people, as it offers free shelter, food, and education.

Prince Emmanuel is called "Dada" by his followers, which was a name taken from Idi Amin, who was called Idi Amin Dada. Emmanuel is also seen by the Bobos as part of a triad - together with Marcus Garvey and Haile Selassie I, where Selassie is regarded as King, Garvey as prophet, and Emmanuel as high priest. Marcus Garvey is praised by the Rastafarians for his call for pan-Africanism, which looks to unite Africans all over the world and achieve gender, social, and economic equality. In his Farewell Speech in 1916, Garvey announced the future crowning of a Black King, the spot which Haile Selassie filled as the leader of the Black Nation and Messiah. He is considered the reincarnation of the King Alpha, and Empress Menen is considered the reincarnation of Queen Omega.

== Gender hierarchy ==
Bobo Ashanti women hold a traditional yet nuanced social role. Similar to traditional religious and cultural standards, men are in charge of work outside the home and the financials, while the woman is to maintain the home life and children. The respective titles of a woman and man in a relationship are "Empress" and "King", "Kingman", or "head". Women must cover their legs, arms, and hair with a turban. Men in the Bobo Ashanti community are considered Priests as they conduct religious services and gatherings.

== Bobo Ashanti in pop culture ==
The genre of Reggae arose in the 1960s as a form of cultural expression and communication for Rastafarians in Jamaica, especially through the Nyabinghi mansion of Rastafari thanks to the Nyabinghi drums. Reggae grew as a powerful tool to inspire change in society concerning racism and liberalism, a central theme in Rastafari. Unlike other Rastafari groups, the Bobo Ashanti are against Reggae music, claiming it is satanic. Despite this, beginning in the mid-1990s, many reggae artists have emerged from the Bobo Ashanti; the most well known among them are Sizzla, Capleton, Anthony B, Lutan Fyah, Turbulence, Ras Shiloh. These artists' actual affiliation with the Bobo community and religiosity is unclear, as some speculate their Bobo Ashanti identity is used more as a defining characteristic and fashion statement. For example, Sizzla highlights the dreads worn by Bobo Ashanti in one of his songs with lyrics: "Bun fire pon men weh have locks and still nah go Rastaman Tabernacle... you see dem in the clubs and you see dem in the pubs, and they never ever step beneath the Tabernacle roof", suggesting disconnect with faith but still maintaining culture. Capleton embraces the Bobo Ashanti's religiosity and resistance to Westernized dress and fashion appearance in his music, with lyrics like, "Call Bobo Ashanti from the hill top, Separate the wolf from the sheep flock." The "sheep flock" here being Bobo Ashanti and other pure Rastafarians and the "wolf" being "fake" Rastas who are still eating animal flesh, and also other meat eaters. For decades, Rasta singers have sung songs about "wolves in sheep clothing". Dennis Brown, Fred Locks, Big Youth, John Holt, Sugar Minott, and others. Wolves are flesh-eating predators, but by contrast, sheep are gentle vegans, living under the protection of their shepherd. Rastas liken themselves to sheep, living under the protection of Jah Rastafari, the Good Shepherd. Their wooly hair matted into locks is like the fleece of a sheep. Sizzla often refers to those Rastas who grow locks but have not renounced the eating of animal flesh (as per Numbers Chapter 6), as "wolf under wool".

Other artists such as Beenie Man commend the work of Emmanuel, but do not necessarily favor the splitting of the Rastafari religion into branches, with lines like, "Now Emmanuel dead, everything tumble down, The Hill divided in a three, separated bu three sons." On the other hand, there is a trend for young Bobo artists to be heroes or defendants of the Bobo Ashanti community. Artists like Capleton remain true to the Bobo Ashanti spirit and make statements like, "We, a di whole a we deh inna Selassie family, but Jah."

The conservative and strict nature of the Bobo Ashanti is sometimes compared to that of Islamic fundamentalism by the Rastas from more moderate and less strict mansions. Artists such as Midnite and Lutan Fyah have even gone as far as to call Bobos "the Jamaican Taliban", as both artists have used the term "Bobo Shanti Taliban" in their music. The metaphor also alludes to the attire and turbans worn by Bobos, even though they are different in color and style. Bobo Ashanti artist Junior Reid expresses these ideas in his music, claiming immigration would ask him questions about where he was at the time of the bombing and people mistaking him for an Arab.
