= Vernon Carrington =

Rastafari leader

Vernon Carrington (November 1, 1936 – March 22, 2005), also known as the prophet Gad, founded the Twelve Tribes of Israel branch of the Rastafari movement in 1968.

Carrington was born in Kingston, Jamaica.

To his many followers across Jamaica and the world he was known as the Prophet Gad. Members of the Twelve Tribes of Israel view Carrington as a prophet who began the repatriation of Rastafari to Africa, the homeland. He was a member of The Ethiopian World Federation, founded by Emperor Haile Selassie of Ethiopia. Carrington's branch (charter 15) became The Twelve Tribes Of Israel, setting up at 83 Hope Road, Jamaica.

Carrington also played in a jam band back home. The band was called "The Twelve Vibes of Israel". It was reported that his band would practice for days at a time with soothsayer lyrics and Rastafarian rhythm.
