= Nyabinghi (Mansion of Rastafari) =

Denomination of the Rastafari movement

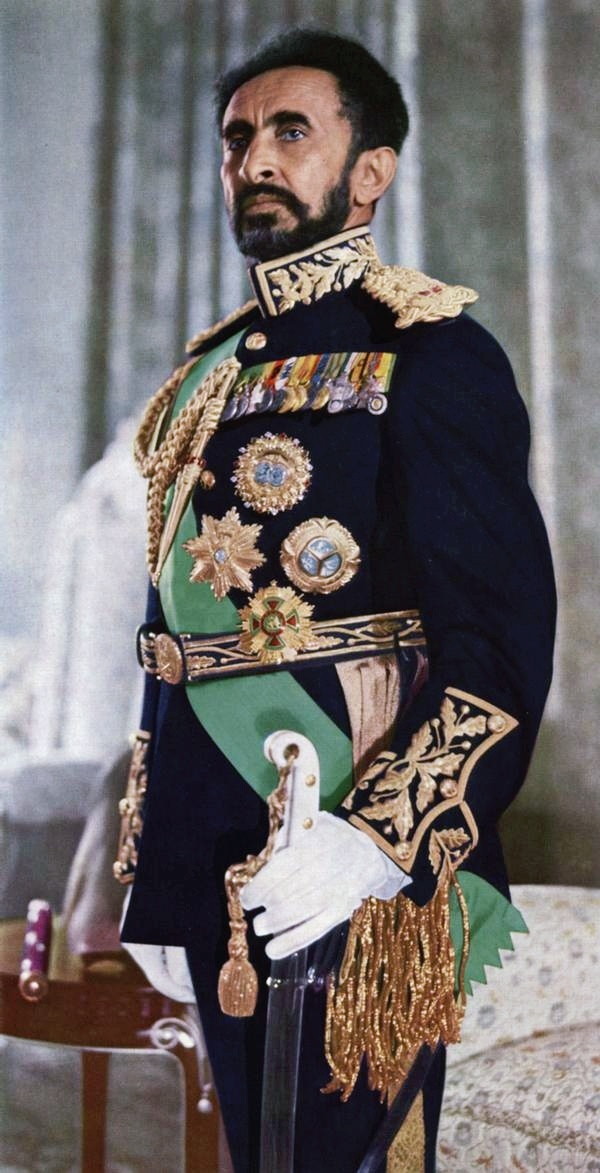
Haile Selassie I

The Nyabingi Order (Also called the House of Nyabingi, or Theocracy Reign Ancient Order of Nyabinghi) is one of the earliest and likely the largest denomination or "mansion" of Rastafarianism. Usually considered to be the strictest of the three major orders, they are known for stressing the idea that former emperor of Ethiopia Halie Selassie I was Jah (Shortened form of the Tetragram) and the second coming of Jesus Christ, the movement is sometimes credited with elders like Ras Boanerges and Bredda Authur.

Originally, the term Nyabingi referred to a form of worship that involved dancing and ritual percussion, considered to be the foundation of Rastafarianism. Other indigenous religions of the Caribbean also played a role in its development, while the growing movement of Black Liberation in Jamaica influenced the theology. The term Nyabingi usually refers to a mythical woman from the Banyarwanda tribe Nyabingi—generally believed to be from Rwanda, Tanzania, or Ugandan regions—who is called "Mother of Abundance" by the Nande people. Another way this name may have come about is through the attribution to prisoners of war across Africa during World War II. This word may have come to Jamaica from Italian journalist Frederico Philos when he had written about a "Secret Society" which called for the "Death to all white farmers."

Once Haile Selassie I had come back to Ethiopia after exile, the prisoners were freed, and they continued their diet voluntarily which consisted of little to no meat. They choose to adopt some of the cultural practices of the Levites of the Tanakh (e.g., not cutting hair.) Following this, cultural events like the Third Great Awakening had influenced Jamaicans to join churches, which led the Rastafarian religion to be founded. Sometime after this, the Rastafarian mansion of Niyabingi was officially established, which was followed by the Twelve Tribes of Israel Mansion and the Bobo Ashanti, the other two major mansions of Rastafarianism.
