= Judaism and Rastafari =

Comparison of faiths

While Rastafari is an Abrahamic religion and culture, it does not closely align in essence, tradition, nor heritage with Judaism. The philosophy, law, rules for living, customs, culture, holidays and theological belief of the two faiths are vastly different. Not only does each religion claim that its own people are the rightful inheritors of ancient Hebrew religion, the purpose and existential nature of messiah rise from very different starting places, and textual bases for and enactment of religious life could not be more different, while still both sharing some modicum of an historical relationship.

== Messianic prophecies ==
Adherents of Rastafari and Judaism both faithfully await the coming of a messiah, as do many religions, including many outside of Abrahamic faiths. Therefore, it is a common feature they share, rather than some rare tenant of faith that creates an assumption of similarity. The expectation for a messiah, the nature of his mission and divinity (or lack thereof) puts these two faiths at opposite ends of messianic interpretation, even within the Abrahamic milieu.

For Rastafari, most believe the messiah initially came in the person of Jesus Christ, and that he has already returned through a second coming in the person of Haile Selassie. In fact, the word Rastafari is derived from the title received when Selassie was crowned Emperor of Ethiopia, Ras Tafari Makonnen. Rastafari regard Selassie as the manifestation of God in human form, and "the living God". Some perceive him as part of a Trinity. He is viewed as the messiah who will lead the peoples of Africa and the African diaspora to freedom.

In Judaism, the messiah has not yet come for a first time, let alone a second time. Jews generally believe that the coming of the true Messiah will be associated with events that have not yet occurred, such as building the Third Temple, a Messianic Age of peace, and the ingathering of Jews to their homeland. The idea of God as a human person is considered heretical – it is even considered by some to be polytheistic. According to Judaic beliefs, the Torah rules out a trinitarian God in Deuteronomy (6:4): "Hear Israel, the LORD is our God, the LORD is one." Judaism teaches that it is heretical for any man to claim to be God, part of God, or the literal son of God. The Jerusalem Talmud states explicitly: "If a man claims to be God, he is a liar."

== Jewish vs. Rastafari laws ==
As part of the Jewish tradition in Rastafari, there is a deep reverence for the Old Testament. However, for Rastafari it is more concerned with the narrative, particularly a myopic focus on the Exodus story as it intersects with the plight of the African diaspora, rather than Judaism's broad view of the entire Torah as a fundamental resource, with its 613 laws, for the arranging of every aspect of daily life, both religious and secular.

Judaism further expands its understanding and application of those 613 laws of the Torah through the other biblical writings, such as Nevi'im and Ketuvim. But, the final authority on interpreting understanding of the Torah (and the rest of Jewish Scripture), including the Exodus narrative which is the original narrative behind all those laws, is the Talmud. The Talmud is, after the Torah or Jewish Bible, the central text of Rabbinic Judaism and the primary source of Jewish religious law (halakha) and Jewish theology. It consists of the Oral Torah (Mishnah) and its commentaries (Gemara).

Rastafari, on the other hand, looks for biblical interpretation through modern works, such as Kebra Nagast (14th century), which is far more an Orthodox Christian text and not at all Jewish, and key Rasta tracts like Holy Piby by Robert Athlyi Rogers (1931) and The Promised Key by Leonard Howell (c. 1935). These texts, rather than aligning with Jewish interpretations and a focus on similar customs, belief, and rules for daily life, attempt to establish a narrative that calls for Black and African authority over Abrahamic religion.

== Sources ==
- Barnett, Michael (2006). "Differences and Similarities Between the Rastafari Movement and the Nation of Islam". Journal of Black Studies. 36 (6): 873–893. doi:10.1177/0021934705279611. JSTOR 40034350. S2CID 145012190.
- Bedasse, Monique (2010). "Rasta Evolution: The Theology of the Twelve Tribes of Israel". Journal of Black Studies. 40 (5): 960–973. doi:10.1177/0021934708320135. JSTOR 40648616. S2CID 145344807.
- Clarke, Peter B. (1986). Black Paradise: The Rastafarian Movement. New Religious Movements Series. Wellingborough: The Aquarian Press. ISBN 978-0-85030-428-2.
- Edmonds, Ennis B. (2012). Rastafari: A Very Short Introduction. Oxford: Oxford University Press. ISBN 978-0-19-958452-9.
- Kebede, Alemseghed; Knottnerus, J. David (1998). "Beyond the Pales of Babylon: The Ideational Components and Social Psychological Foundations of Rastafari". Sociological Perspectives. 41 (3): 499–517. doi:10.2307/1389561. JSTOR 1389561. S2CID 147000068.
- Mhango, Mtendeweka Owen (2008). "The Constitutional Protection of Minority Religious Rights in Malawi: The Case of Rastafari Students". Journal of African Law. 52 (2): 218–244. doi:10.1017/S0021855308000107. JSTOR 27608008. S2CID 145792028.
- Watson, G. Llewellyn (1973). "Social Structure and Social Movements: The Black Muslims in the U. S. A. and the Ras-Tafarians in Jamaica". The British Journal of Sociology. 24 (2): 188–204. doi:10.2307/588377. JSTOR 588377.
