= Charles Edwards (Rastafari) =

Rastafarian leader (1915–1994)

Charles Edwards (1915–1994), known as "King Emmanuel Charles" by his followers, was the founder and leader of the "Ethiopia Africa Black International Congress, True Church of Divine Salvation (E.A.B.I.C.)". Charles is regarded to have established the "Churchical Order of Melchizedek" which governs this Congress functioning as Church and State. On March 1, 1958, the E.A.B.I.C was formed, now headquartered in Bull Bay, Jamaica. This group of Rastafari soon became known as Bobo Ashanti, adopting their name from the Ashanti tribe in Ghana. Charles taught that the African diaspora scattered across the Earth and predominantly in the west are the descendants of the Israelites and his followers acknowledge him as the "Black Moses" in this dispensation to return all slave descendants to their original homeland, Ethiopia. For this reason this Congress was formed and Church developed agitating for the "Freedom, Redemption and International Repatriation" of his people. Charles fought relentlessly for the rights of his people and soon became publicly respected and given the titles 'Black Christ in Flesh'. He is held by the Bobo Ashanti to be a member of their Holy Trinity. Charles taught that "God dwelleth in flesh" and the celestial trinity of God manifested in flesh upon Earth is fulfilled.
