= Twelve Tribes of Israel (Rastafari) =

Rastafari group formed in 1968

The Twelve Tribes of Israel is a Rastafari religious group and one of the Mansions of Rastafari. Its headquarters is on Hope Road in Kingston, Jamaica. The group was formed in 1968 by Vernon Carrington, who was known to the organisation as "Prophet Gad". The twelve tribes have been described as the Rastafari mansion closest in beliefs to Christianity or Messianic Judaism. Members follow the teaching of reading the Bible (the Scofield Reference Bible, King James Version) a chapter a day from Genesis 1 to Revelation 22, a practice encouraged by Carrington. It is the most liberal of the Rastafarian orders and members are free to worship in a church or building of their choosing.

== Beliefs ==
The Twelve Tribes of Israel teach salvation through the Messiyah Jesus Christ, whom they refer to as either Yeshua or by the Amharic name Iyesus Kirisitos. It is perhaps the Rastafari mansion closest in beliefs to Christianity or Messianic Judaism.

Haile Selassie, Emperor of Ethiopia, is seen as a divinely anointed king in the lineage of Kings David and Solomon (Selassie's house being called the Solomonic dynasty). While he is considered a representation of "Christ in His Kingly Character", he is not seen as an incarnation of the Messiyah, nor as Jah Himself, but rather as an emissary of Jah and representative of the everlasting Davidic covenant, which is to be fulfilled by Christ upon his return.

Some members of the Twelve Tribes of Israel, like other Rastafarians, reject the consumption of alcohol, refrain from cutting their hair, and avoid the dead and anything having to do with death, as a part of the Nazirite vows. They also keep the Sabbath, and follow Ital dietary laws.

There is no doctrine however which forces them to do so: so some members choose to cut their hair, drink alcohol or eat meat; which they are free to do.

== Organization and practices ==
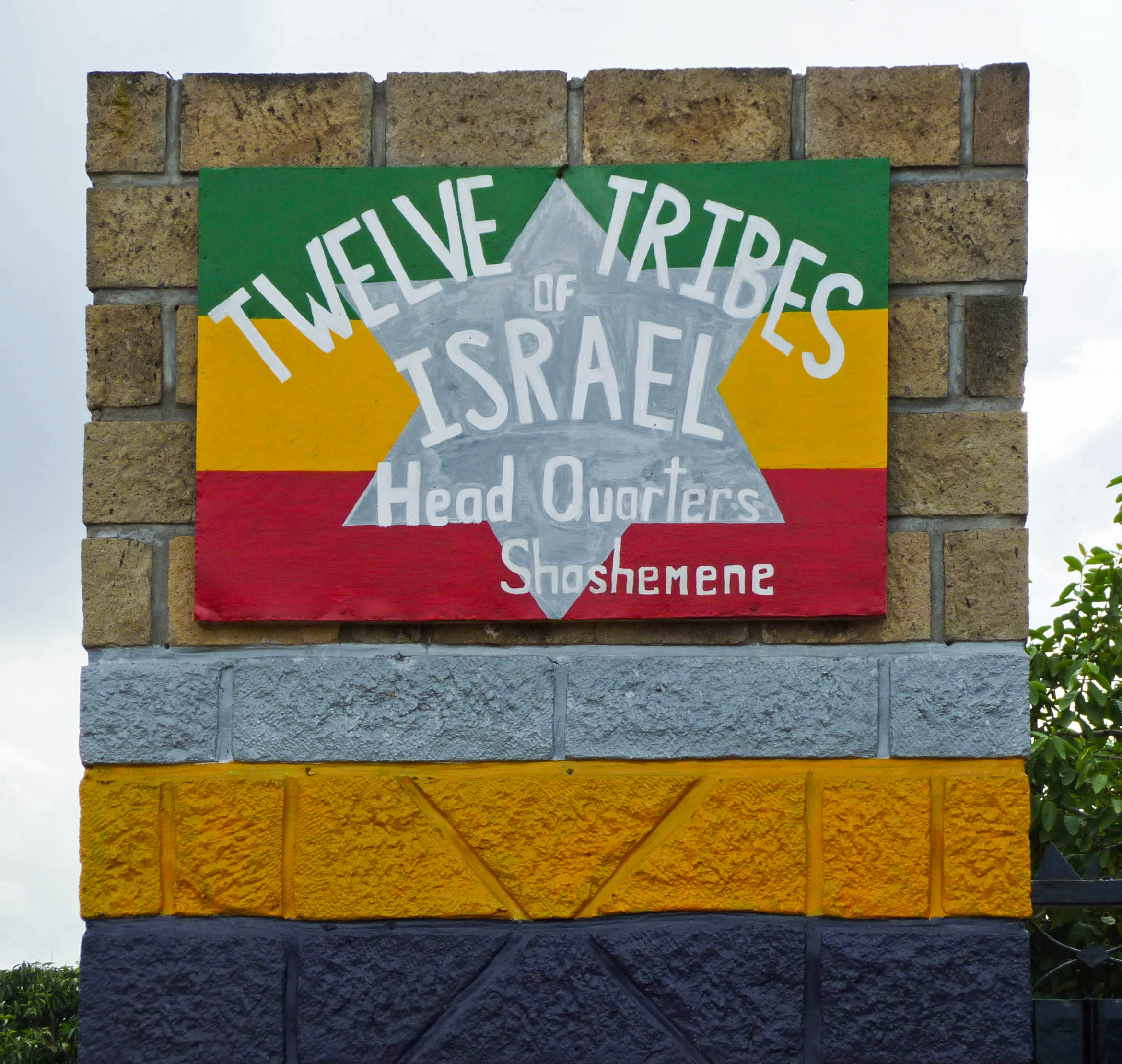
The headquarters of the Twelve Tribes of Israel organisation in Shashamane, Ethiopia

Members are grouped into Twelve Tribes, modelled after the Twelve Tribes of Israel: Reuben, Simeon, Levi, Judah, Issachar, Zebulun, Dan, Gad, Asher, Naphtali, Joseph, and Benjamin. Each member belongs to a tribe, which is determined by Gregorian birth month, though beginning in April in rough alignment with the Jewish calendar. Each tribe is represented by a color, a part of the body, and a character trait, often called a "faculty". Although the twelve representations apply to male and female alike, Dinah, though not considered a tribe, is representative of the feminine.

Members of this order are not required to be turbaned; however, they do wear red, gold, and green banners at meetings, during prayer and Bible readings as a holy garment. The Twelve Tribes of Israel functions internationally and has headquarters in various countries. Members work towards repatriation to Africa, mainly Ethiopia (Shashamane).

Artists associated with the group include Bob Marley, Sangie Davis, Fred Locks, Little Roy, and Pablove Black. The group had an association with the Jah Love sound system in the 1970s.

== See also ==
- Ethiopian Orthodox Tewahedo Church
