= Streamertail =

Scientific classification
- Kingdom: Animalia
- Phylum: Chordata
- Class: Aves
- Order: Apodiformes
- Family: Trochilidae
- Tribe: Trochilini
- Genus: Trochilus; Linnaeus, 1758

Type species
- Trochilus polytmus Linnaeus, 1758

Species
- 1-2, see text

Genus of birds

The streamertails are hummingbirds in the genus Trochilus that are endemic to Jamaica. It is the type genus of the family Trochilidae. Today, most authorities consider the two taxa in this genus as separate species, but some (e.g. AOU) continue to treat them as conspecific, in which case T. scitulus is a subspecies of T. polytmus. A wide range of common names applies to this combined species, including green-and-black streamertail, Jamaican streamertail, or simply streamertail. The name "streamertail" is a reference to the greatly elongated rectrices of the males.

== Taxonomy and species list ==
The genus Trochilus was introduced in 1758 by Swedish naturalist Carl Linnaeus in the 10th edition of his Systema Naturae. The genus name is from the Ancient Greek τροχιλος/trokhilos, a small unidentified bird mentioned by Aristotle. Later authors assumed the word referred to a wren. The type species was subsequently designated as the red-billed streamertail. In his Systema Naturae, Linnaeus included 18 species of hummingbirds, all of which he placed in Trochilus. Today, 12 of these species are still recognised, but only the red-billed streamertail is retained in its original genus. Two species are now placed in the genus.

Genus Trochilus – Linnaeus, 1758 – two species
| Common name | Scientific name and subspecies | Range | Size and ecology | IUCN status and estimated population |
|---|---|---|---|---|
| Red-billed streamertail Male Female | Trochilus polytmus Linnaeus, 1758 | Jamaica | Size: Habitat: Diet: | LC |
| Black-billed streamertail | Trochilus scitulus (Brewster & Bangs, 1901) | eastern Jamaica | Size: Habitat: Diet: | LC |
