= Caricel =

- Industry: Telecommunications
- Founded: 2014
- Headquarters: 4 Eastwood park Road, Kingston, Jamaica
- Key people: Lowell Lawrence CEO
- Products: LTE Broadband
- Website: www.caricel.net

Symbiote Investments Limited operating under the name Caricel is a Jamaican owned and operated mobile network.

== History ==
Caricel was started in March 2014 when Symbiote applied for a Carrier and Service Provider licence from the Office of Utilities Regulation (OUR) in Jamaica. In February 2016, the Ministry of Science, Technology, Energy and Mining (MSTEM) announced that a new mobile network operator licence was being considered by the Jamaican Government. Despite a change in administration between the announcement and granting the licence in May, Caricel was approved for a Spectrum licence.

== Technology ==
In 2016, Caricel announced it would roll out its LTE-only network within the Kingston Metropolitan Area. They invested over US$50 million in deployment and is looking at spending another US$50 million over the next 3 years. The company has already secured towers islandwide and said it would be rolling out to the rest of Jamaica.
