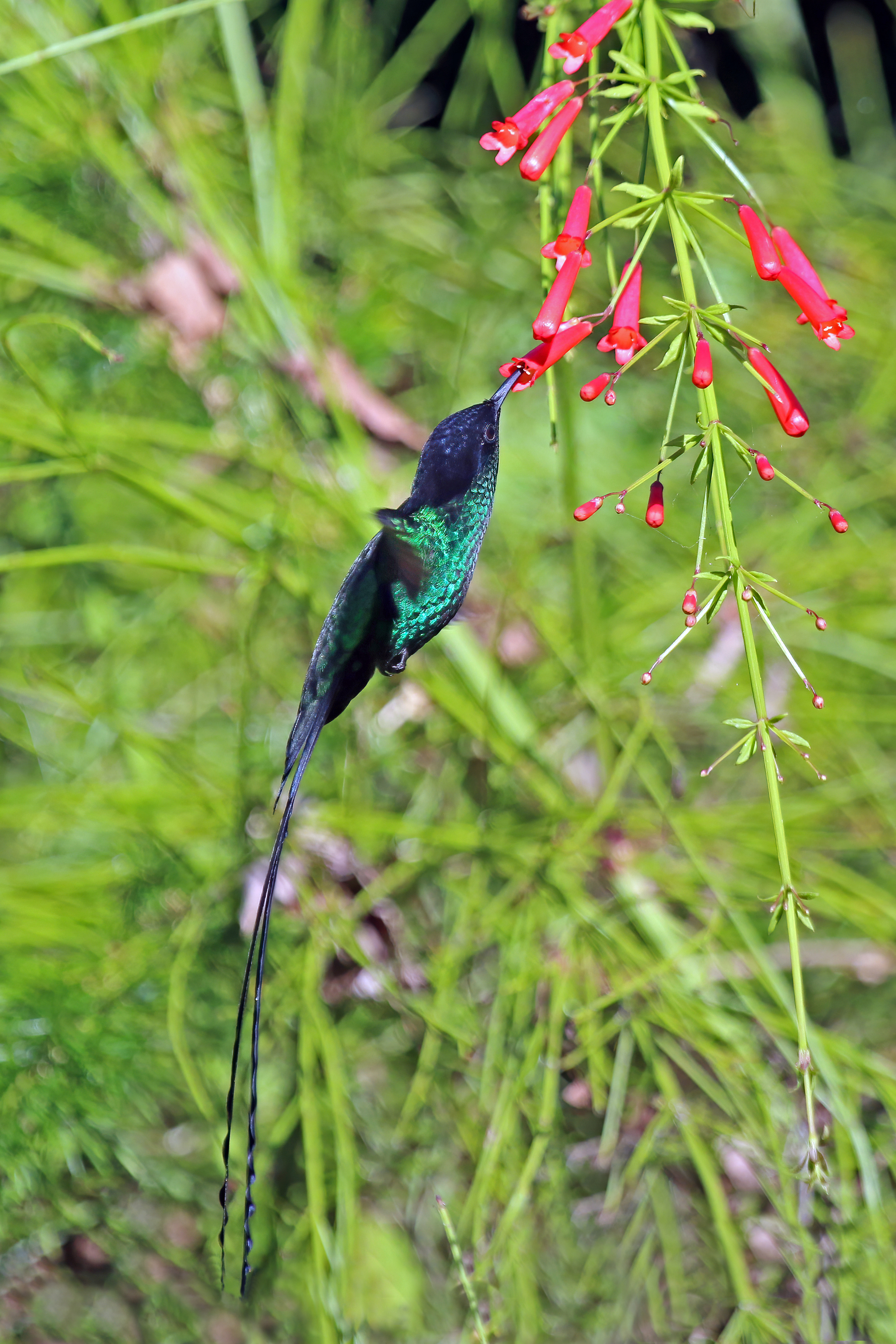
- Male feeding

Conservation status
- Least Concern (IUCN 3.1)
- CITES Appendix II

Scientific classification
- Kingdom: Animalia
- Phylum: Chordata
- Class: Aves
- Order: Apodiformes
- Family: Trochilidae
- Genus: Trochilus
- Species: T. scitulus

Binomial name
- Trochilus scitulus (Brewster & Bangs, 1901)

Synonyms
- Trochilus polytmus scitulus

= Black-billed streamertail =

Species of hummingbird

The black-billed streamertail (Trochilus scitulus) is a species of hummingbird in the "emeralds", tribe Trochilini of subfamily Trochilinae. It is endemic to eastern Jamaica.

== Taxonomy and systematics ==
The International Ornithological Committee (IOC), BirdLife International's Handbook of the Birds of the World, and the Clements taxonomy treat the black-billed streamertail and red-billed streamertail (Trochilus polytmus) as separate species. However, the North American Classification Committee of the American Ornithological Society treats them as subspecies of the "streamertail" under the binomial T. polytmus. The two species (or subspecies) interbreed in their narrow contact zone.

The species as defined by the IOC is monotypic, with no subspecies being recognised.

== Description ==
The male black-billed streamertail is 22 to 24 cm (8.7 to 9.4 in) long including the 10 to 13 cm (3.9 to 5.1 in) tail streamers and weighs 4.0 to 5.8 g (0.14 to 0.20 oz). The female is about 10.5 cm (4.1 in) long and weighs 3.5 to 5.5 g (0.12 to 0.19 oz). Both sexes have a black bill. The male has a dull black to blue-black crown; it and the nape form a deep velvety black crest. The rest of its upperparts are bright grass green. Its tail is black with a green to bronzy green gloss. The next to outermost pair of tail feathers is very long, giving the species its English name. The male's face and most of its underparts are metallic green; the undertail coverts are blue-black or black with a bluish gloss. The adult female's upperparts are metallic bronze green to greenish bronze that is duller on the crown. Its tail lacks the male's streamers. Its central pair of feathers are bright bronze green and the rest black with some bronze green gloss, and the outermost two pairs have wide white tips. Its underparts are white with metallic bronze green spots on the breast and flanks. Immature males are similar to the adult but lack the tail streamers; its tail feathers have bronze green tips.

== Distribution and habitat ==
The black-billed streamertail is found in far eastern Jamaica; its range slightly overlaps that of the red-billed which is found throughout the rest of the island. It inhabits evergreen montane forest, lowland tropical forest, and secondary forest. It shuns mangroves and arid highlands. In elevation it ranges from sea level to 1,500 m (4,900 ft); it is considered fairly common in the lowlands and common at middle and higher elevations.

== Behaviour ==
=== Movement ===
The black-billed streamertail is an elevational migrant.

=== Feeding ===
The black-billed streamertail forages for nectar at a wide variety of native and introduced flowering species; it especially prefers Besleria lutea. It forages at all heights from the ground to the canopy. It has also been observed "robbing" nectar from holes in flowers created by bananaquits (Coereba flaveola) and visiting wells drilled by yellow-bellied sapsuckers (Sphyrapicus varius). In addition to nectar, it feeds on small insects taken while hovering or gleaned from foliage or spiderweb.

=== Breeding ===
Both sexes of the black-billed streamertail aggressively defend territories. Males court females that enter their territory. Both sexes make repetitive forward and back flights, after which the male flies up and down in front of the female while spreading its tail streamers. The species breeds at any time of year, mostly between January and May, and may raise three broods in a year. The nest is a cup of fine plant fibers bound with spiderweb with lichen on the outside. It is typically built on a fine twig between 1 and 3 m (3 and 10 ft) above the ground. The female incubates the clutch of two eggs for 17 to 19 days and fledging occurs 19 to 24 days after hatch.

=== Vocal and non-vocal sounds ===
The black-billed streamertail's vocalisations include "a loud metallic ting or teet and a prolonged twink-twink-twink dropping in pitch at the end". Adult males in flight produce a distinctive whirring sound. The whirring is synchronised with the wingbeats and video footage shows primary feather eight (P8) bending with each downstroke, creating a gap that produces the fluttering sound.

== Status ==
The IUCN has assessed the black-billed streamertail as being of Least Concern, though it has a restricted range and its population size and trend are not known. No immediate threats have been identified. "The ready occupation of man-made habitats suggests that habitat loss is unlikely to be a problem".
