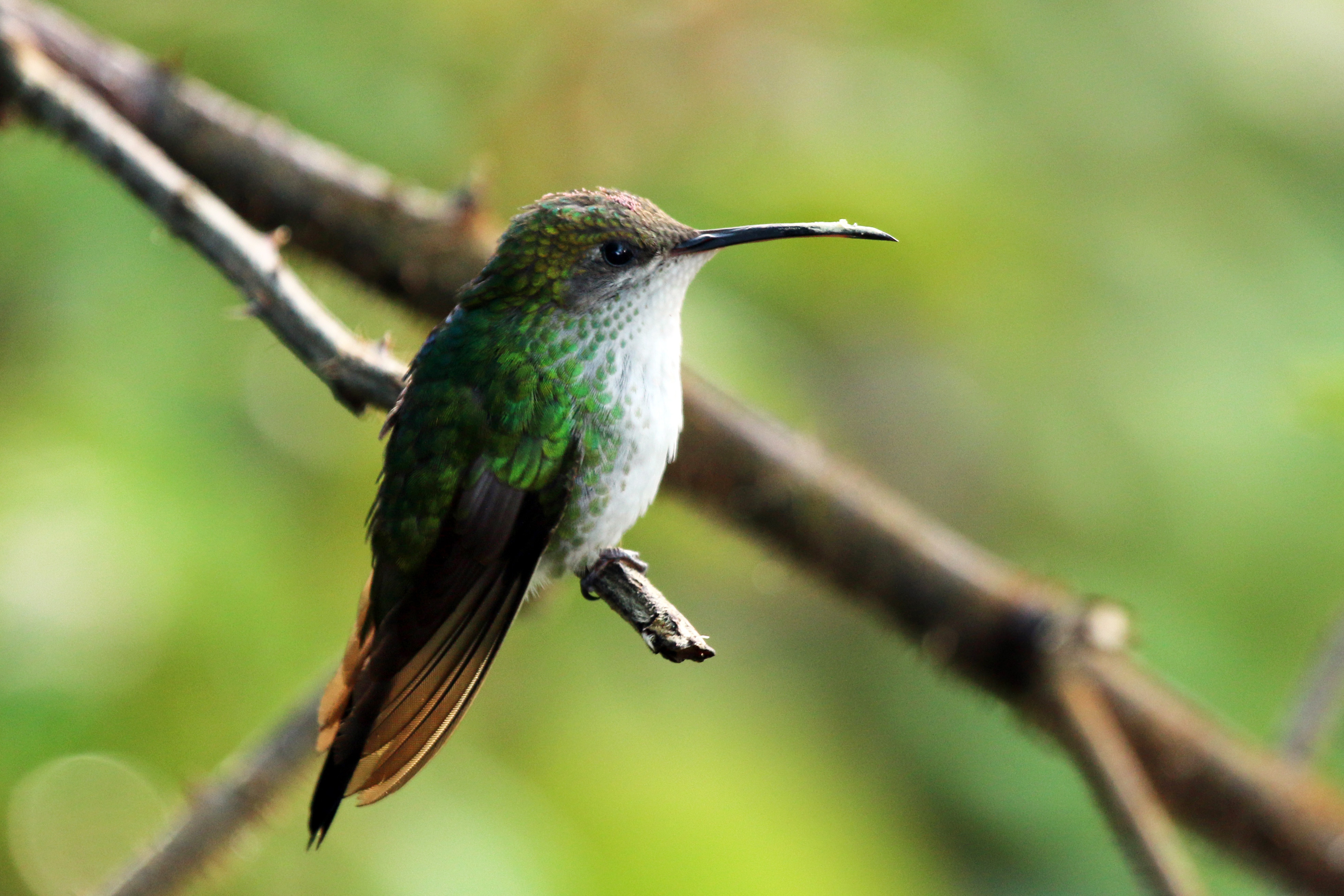
- Female

Conservation status
- Least Concern (IUCN 3.1)
- CITES Appendix II

Scientific classification
- Kingdom: Animalia
- Phylum: Chordata
- Class: Aves
- Order: Apodiformes
- Family: Trochilidae
- Genus: Trochilus
- Species: T. polytmus

Binomial name
- Trochilus polytmus Linnaeus, 1758

Synonyms
- Trochilus polytmus polytmus

= Red-billed streamertail =

- Adult male

Species of hummingbird

The red-billed streamertail (Trochilus polytmus), also known as the doctor bird, or swallow tail hummingbird, is a species of hummingbird in the "emeralds", tribe Trochilini of the subfamily Trochilinae. It is endemic to Jamaica and is the national bird of the country.

== Taxonomy and systematics ==
The red-billed streamertail was formally described by the Swedish naturalist Carl Linnaeus in 1758 in the tenth edition of his Systema Naturae under the binomial name Trochilus polytmus. Linnaeus quoted the description in Latin by the Irish physician Patrick Browne in his The Civil and Natural History of Jamaica which had been published two years earlier in 1756. The specific epithet polytmus is from the Ancient Greek polutimos meaning "costly" or "valuable".

The International Ornithological Committee (IOC), BirdLife International's Handbook of the Birds of the World, and the Clements taxonomy treat the red-billed streamertail and black-billed streamertail (T. scitulus) as separate species. However, the North American Classification Committee of the American Ornithological Society calls T. polytmus "streamertail" and assign the red-billed and black-billed forms to it as subspecies. The two species (or subspecies) interbreed in their narrow contact zone.

The species as defined by the IOC is monotypic, with no subspecies being recognised.

== Description ==
The male red-billed streamertail is 22 to 25 cm (8.7 to 9.8 in) long including the 10 to 13 cm (3.9 to 5.1 in) tail streamers and weighs 4.0 to 6.5 g (0.14 to 0.23 oz). The female is about 10.5 cm (4.1 in) long and weighs 3.0 to 6.1 g (0.11 to 0.22 oz).

Versus the eastern black-billed sister taxon, the adult male is distinguished by a coral red bill with a black tip. Adult females and immatures have duller red on the bill. The adult male plumage is mostly bright metallic green on the upperparts. The crown is dull black to blue-black crown; it and the nape form a deep velvety black crest. Its tail is black with a green to bronzy green gloss. The next to outermost pair of tail feathers is very long, giving the species its English name. The male's face and most of its underparts are metallic yellowish green; the undertail coverts are blue-black or black with a bluish gloss.

The adult female's bill is a duller red than the male's. Its upperparts are metallic bronze green to greenish bronze that is duller on the crown. Its tail lacks the male's streamers. Its central pair of feathers are bright bronze green and the rest black with some bronze green gloss, and the outermost two pairs have wide white tips. Its underparts are white with metallic bronze green spots on the breast and flanks. Immature males are similar to the adult but lack the tail streamers; its tail feathers have bronze green tips.

== Distribution and habitat ==
The red-billed streamertail is found throughout Jamaica except in the extreme eastern end, where the black-billed is found. It inhabits evergreen montane forest, lowland tropical forest, and secondary forest. It shuns mangroves and arid highlands. In elevation it ranges from sea level to 1,500 m (4,900 ft); it is considered fairly common in the lowlands and abundant at middle and higher elevations.

== Behaviour ==
=== Movement ===
The red-billed streamertail is an elevational migrant.

=== Feeding ===
The red-billed streamertail forages for nectar at a wide variety of native and introduced flowering species; it especially prefers Besleria lutea. It forages at all heights from the ground to the canopy. It has also been observed "robbing" nectar from holes in flowers created by bananaquits (Coereba flaveola) and visiting wells drilled by yellow-bellied sapsuckers (Sphyrapicus varius). In addition to nectar it feeds on small insects taken while hovering or gleaned from foliage or spiderweb.

=== Breeding ===
Both sexes of the red-billed streamertail aggressively defend territories. Males court females that enter their territory. Both sexes perch and repeatedly nod their heads, after which the male flies up and down in front of the female while spreading its tail streamers. The species breeds at any time of year, mostly between January and May, and may raise three broods in a year. The nest is a cup of fine plant fibers bound with spiderweb with lichen on the outside. It is typically built on a fine twig between 1 and 3 m (3 and 10 ft) above the ground. The female incubates the clutch of two eggs for 17 to 19 days and fledging occurs 19 to 24 days after hatch.

=== Vocal and non-vocal sounds ===
The red-billed streamertail's vocalisations include "a loud metallic ting or teet and a prolonged twink-twink-twink dropping in pitch at the end". Adult males in flight produce a distinctive whirring sound. The whirring is synchronised with the wingbeats and video footage shows primary feather eight (P8) bending with each downstroke, creating a gap that produces the fluttering sound.

== Status ==
The IUCN has assessed the red-billed streamertail as being of Least Concern. It has a large range but its population size and trend are not known. No immediate threats have been identified. "The ready occupation of man-made habitats suggests that habitat loss is unlikely to be a problem".

== Gallery ==
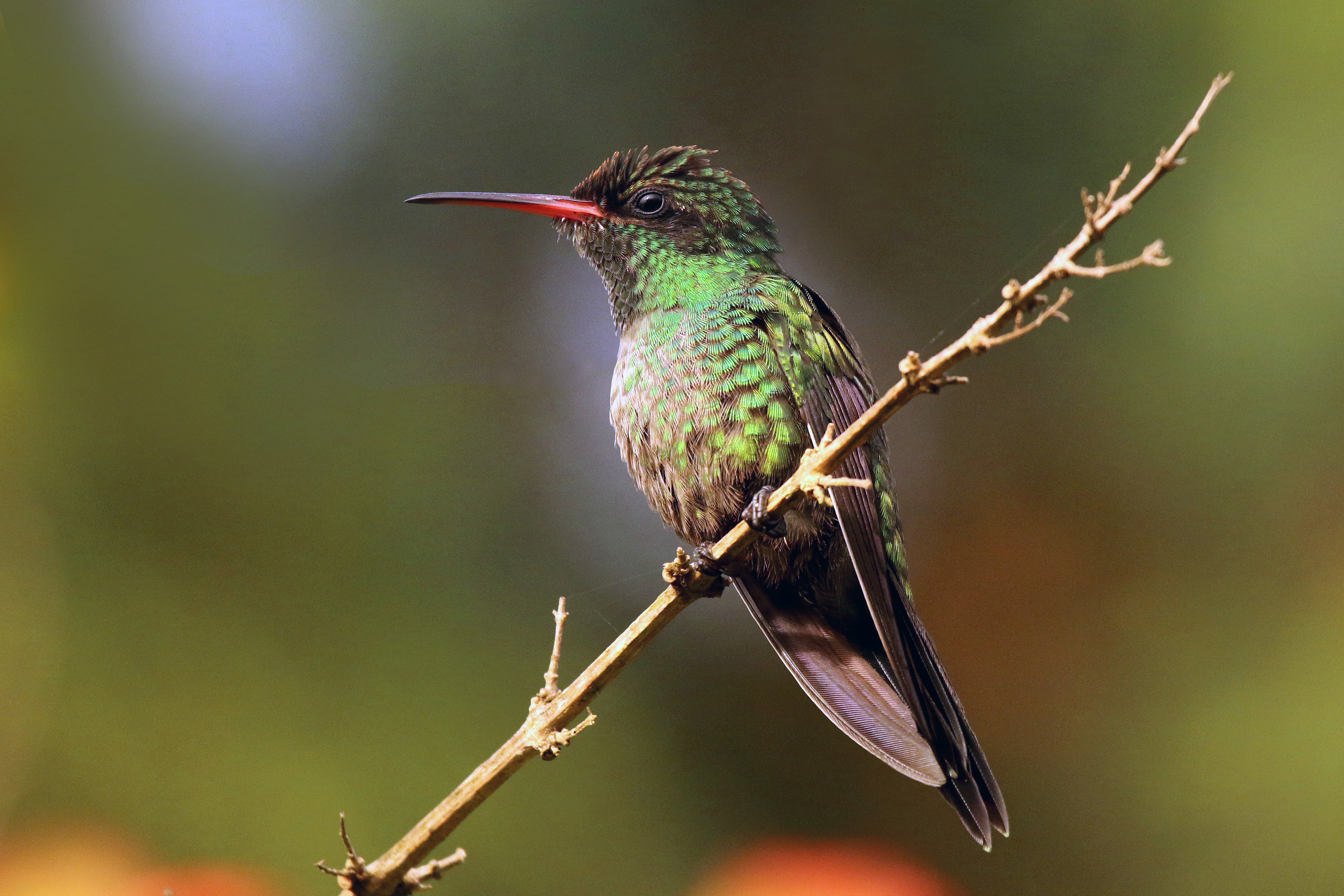
Juvenile male

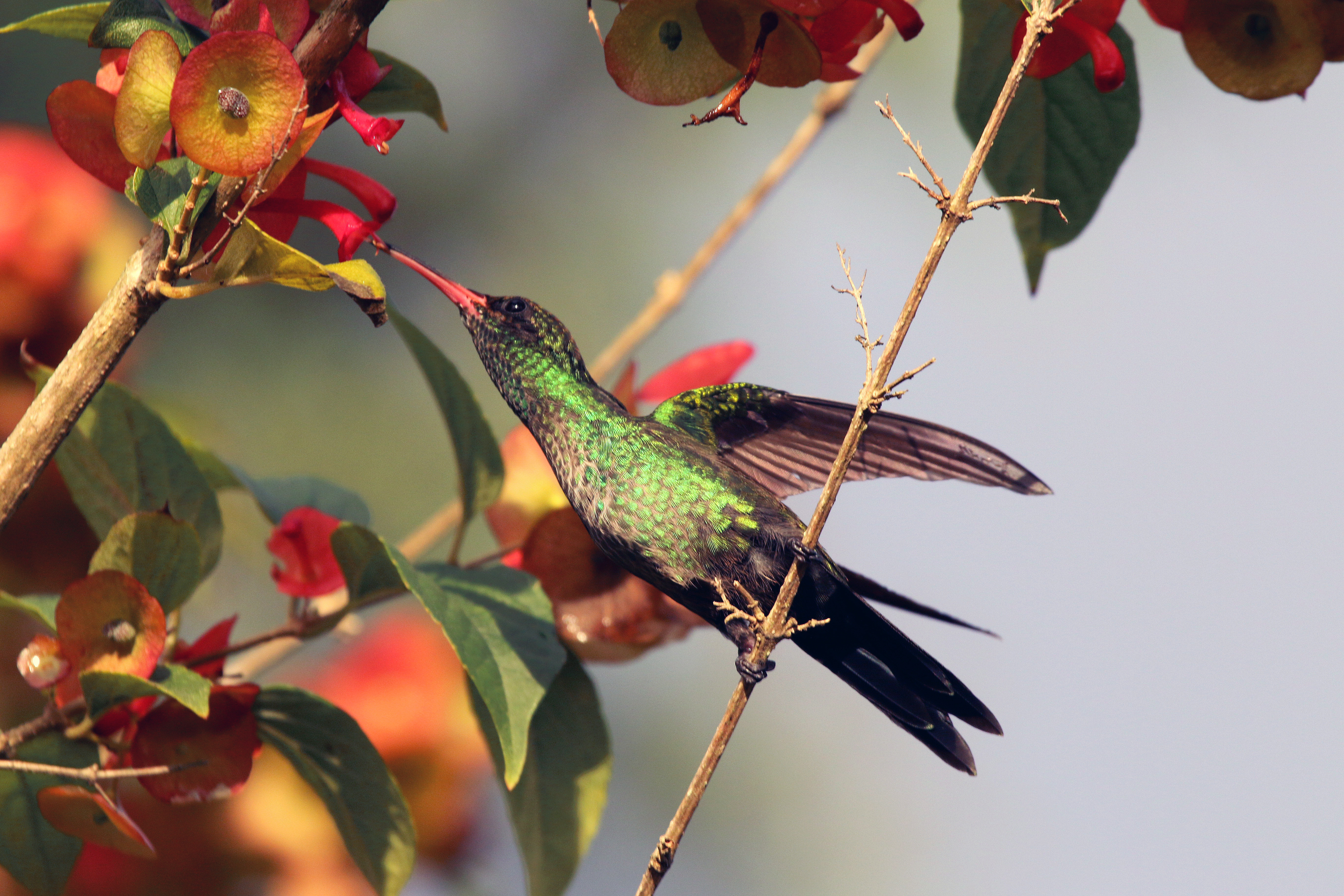
Juvenile male feeding

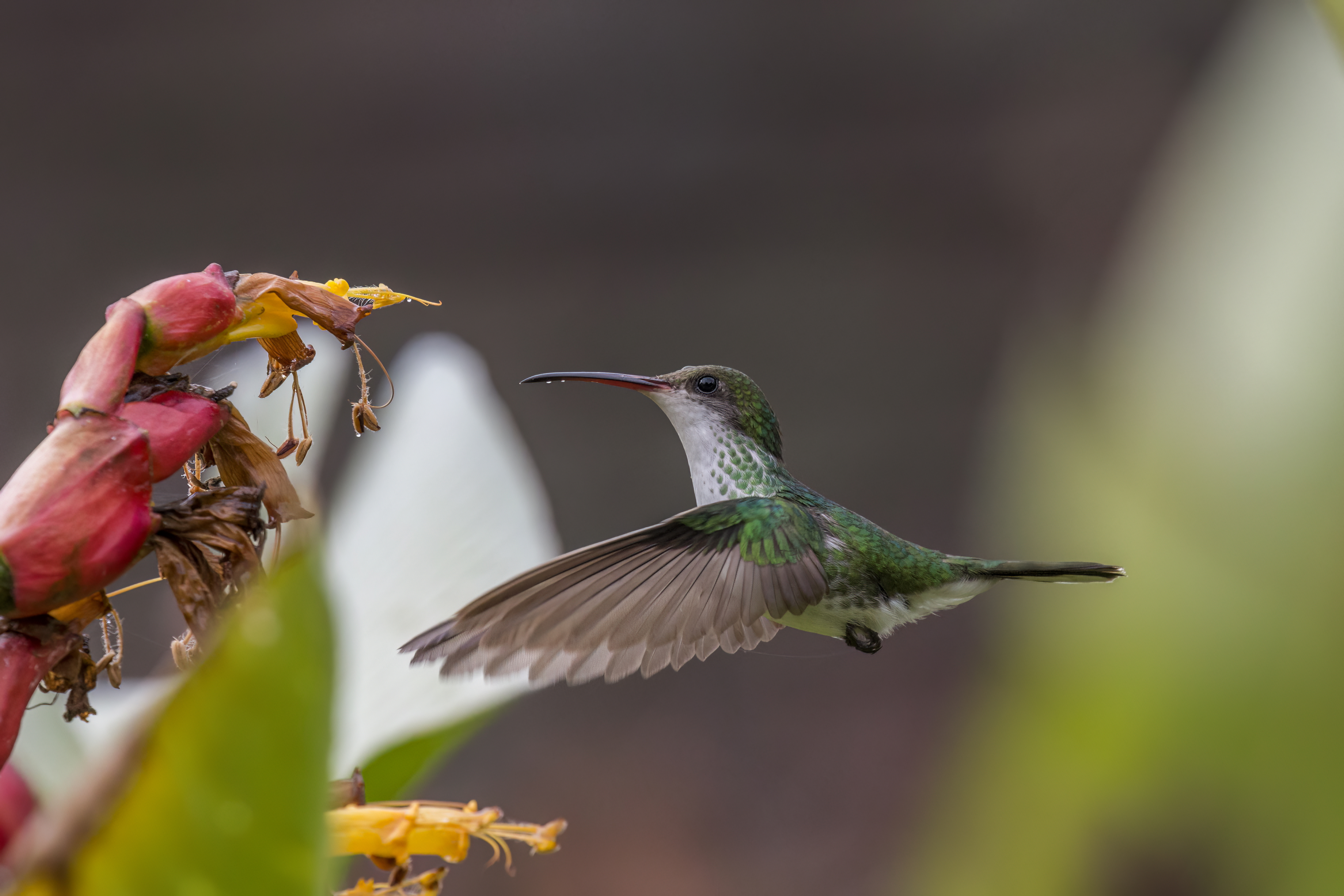
Female in flight
