= Jamaica =

Caribbean nation

Jamaica Jumieka (Jamaican Patois)
- Flag Coat of arms
- Motto: "Out of Many, One People"
- Anthem: "Jamaica, Land We Love"
- Capital and largest city: Kingston; 17°58′17″N 76°47′35″W
- Official languages: English
- Vernacular language: Jamaican Patois
- Ethnic groups: 76.3% African; 15.1% Mixed; 3.4% Indian; 3.2% White; 1.2% Chinese; 0.8% others
- Religion: 68.9% Christianity; 64.8% Protestantism; 4.1% other Christian; 21.3% no religion; 1.1% Rastafari; 6.5% other; 2.3% unanswered
- Demonym: Jamaican
- Government: Unitary parliamentary constitutional monarchy
  - Monarch: Charles III
  - Governor-General: Patrick Allen
  - Prime Minister: Andrew Holness
- Legislature: Parliament
  - Upper house: Senate
  - Lower house: House of Representatives

Independence from the United Kingdom
  - Granted: 6 August 1962

Area
  - Total: 10,991 km^{2} (4,244 sq mi) (160th)
  - Water (%): 1.5

Population
  - 2024 estimate: ▲2,824,913
  - 2022 census: 2,774,538
  - Density: 266/km^{2} (688.9/sq mi) (54th)
- GDP (PPP): 2024 estimate
  - Total: ▲$33.775 billion (143rd)
  - Per capita: ▲$12,283 (134th)
- GDP (nominal): 2024 estimate
  - Total: ▲$20.586 billion (119th)
  - Per capita: ▲$7,487 (95th)
- Gini (2021): ▲40.2 medium inequality
- HDI (2023): ▲0.720 high (117th)
- Currency: Jamaican dollar (JMD)
- Time zone: UTC-5:00 (EST)
- Calling code: +1
- ISO 3166 code: JM
- Internet TLD: .jm

Jamaica (Note: /dʒəˈmeɪkə/ jə-MAY-kə; Jamaican Patois: Jumieka [dʒʌˈmie̯ka]) is an island country in the Caribbean, covering 10,991 square kilometres (4,244 sq mi). It is the third-largest island in the Greater Antilles and the Caribbean, after Cuba and Hispaniola. Jamaica lies about 145 km (78 nmi) south of Cuba, 191 km (103 nmi) west of Hispaniola, and 215 km (116 nmi) southeast of the Cayman Islands. With 2.8 million people, Jamaica is the third-most populous Anglophone country in the Americas and the fourth-most populous country in the Caribbean. Kingston is the capital and largest city.

The indigenous Ciboney people gradually came under Spanish rule after the arrival of Christopher Columbus in 1494. Many of the indigenous people either were killed or died of diseases, after which the Spanish brought large numbers of Africans to Jamaica as slaves. The island belonged to Spain under the name Santiago until 1655, when England conquered it and named it Jamaica. It became an important part of the colonial British West Indies. Under Britain's colonial rule, Jamaica became a leading sugar exporter, with a plantation economy dependent on continued importation of African slaves and their descendants. The British emancipated all slaves in 1838, and many freedmen chose to have subsistence farms rather than to work on plantations. Beginning in the 1840s, the British began using Chinese and Indian indentured labourers for plantation work. Jamaica achieved independence from the United Kingdom on 6 August 1962.

Jamaica is a parliamentary constitutional monarchy, with power vested in the bicameral Parliament of Jamaica, consisting of an appointed Senate and a directly elected House of Representatives. Andrew Holness has served as Prime Minister of Jamaica since March 2016. Jamaica is a Commonwealth realm, with Charles III as its king; the appointed representative of the Crown is the Governor-General of Jamaica, the office having been held by Patrick Allen since 2009. Because of a high rate of emigration for work since the 1960s, there is a large Jamaican diaspora, particularly in Canada, the United Kingdom, and the United States. Most Jamaicans are of Sub-Saharan African ancestry, with significant European, East Asian (primarily Chinese), Indian, Lebanese, and mixed-race minorities.

Jamaica is an upper-middle-income country with an economy heavily dependent on tourism, including popular resorts. It has an average of 4.3 million tourists per year. Jamaica has a global influence that belies its small size; it is the birthplace of the Rastafari religion and reggae music, along with the associated musical genres of dub, ska, and dancehall; and it is internationally prominent in sports, including cricket, sprinting, and athletics. Jamaica has sometimes been considered the world's least populous cultural superpower.

== Etymology ==
Ciboney called the island Xaymaca in the Taino language, (Note: As represented in Old Spanish orthography, meaning it began with a "sh" sound) meaning the "Land of Wood and Water" or the "Land of Springs". Yamaye has been suggested as a possible early Taíno name for the island as recorded by Christopher Columbus.

Jamaicans often refer to their home island as "yaad" – the Jamaican Patois word for yard, meaning home. Other colloquial names such as "Jamrock", "Jamdown" ("Jamdung" in Jamaican Patois), or briefly "Ja" are also widely used.

== History ==
=== Prehistory ===
There is no archaeological evidence of any human presence on Jamaica until about 500 CE. A group known as the "Redware people" after their pottery arrived circa 600 CE, followed by the Taíno circa 800 CE, who most likely came from South America. They practised an agrarian and fishing economy and at their height are thought to have numbered some 60,000 people, grouped into around 200 villages headed by caciques (chiefs). The south coast was the most populated, especially around the area now known as Old Harbour.

=== Spanish rule (1509–1655) ===
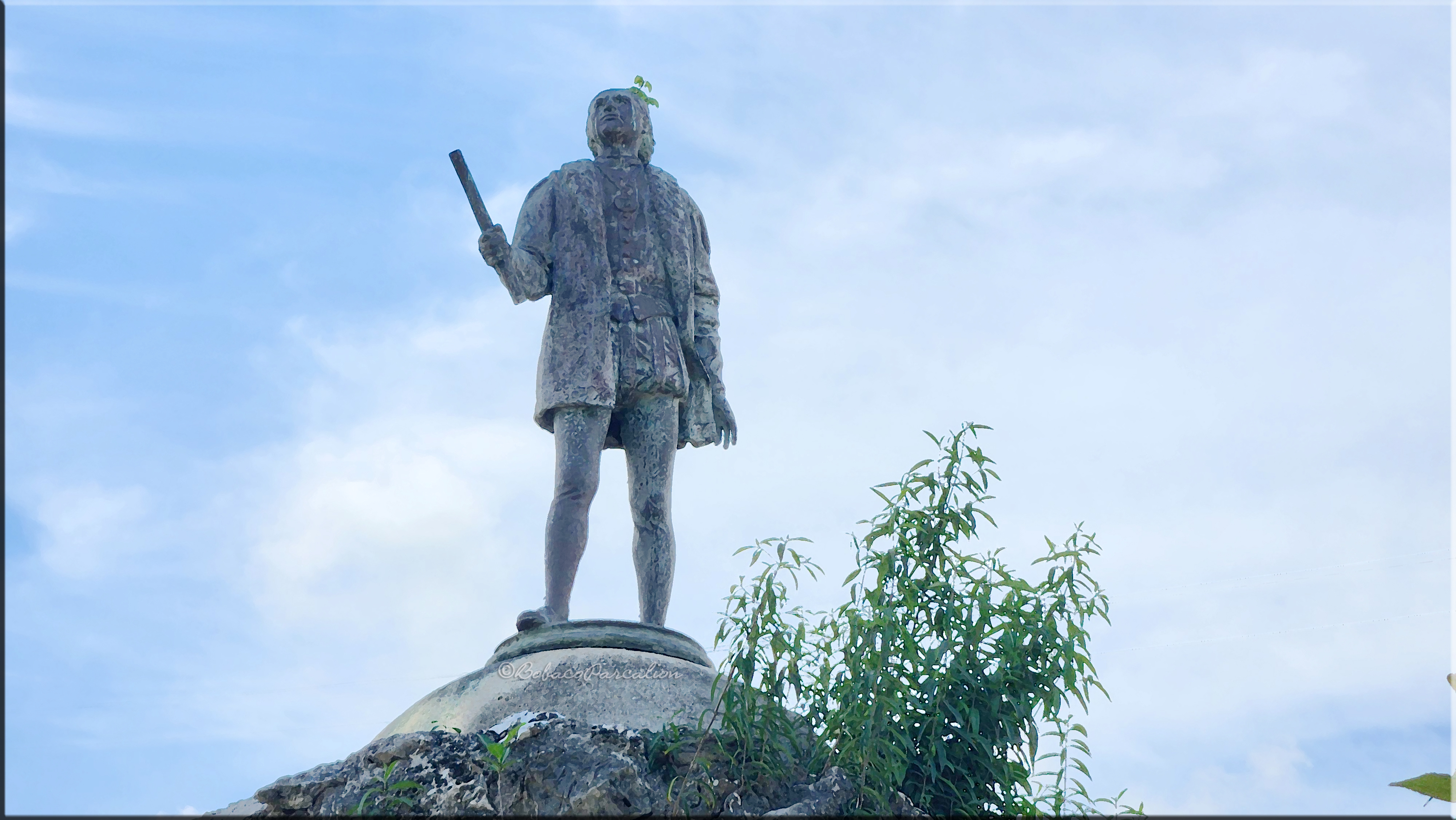
A statue of Christopher Columbus in St. Ann Parish

Columbus was the first European to see Jamaica, claiming the island for Spain after landing there in 1494 on his second voyage to the Americas. His probable landing point was Dry Harbour, called Discovery Bay, and St. Ann's Bay was named "Saint Gloria" by Columbus, as the first sighting of the land. He returned in 1503, when he was shipwrecked, and he and his crew were forced to live on Jamaica for a year while waiting to be rescued.

One and a half kilometres west of St. Ann's Bay is the site of the first Spanish settlement, Sevilla, which was established in 1509 by Juan de Esquivel but abandoned around 1524 because it was deemed unhealthy. The capital was moved to Spanish Town, then called St. Jago de la Vega, around 1534. Meanwhile, the Taínos began dying in large numbers, both from introduced diseases and from enslavement by the Spanish. As a result, the Spanish began importing slaves from Africa to the island.

Many slaves managed to escape, forming autonomous communities in remote and easily defended areas in the interior of Jamaica, mixing with the remaining Taíno; these communities became known as Jamiacan Maroons. During the centuries of slavery, Jamaican Maroons established free communities in the mountainous interior of Jamaica, where they maintained their freedom and independence for generations, under the leadership of Maroon leaders such as Juan de Serras.

Many Jews fled the Spanish Inquisition to live on the island. They lived as conversos and were often persecuted by the Spanish rulers, and some turned to piracy against the Spanish Empire's shipping.

By the early 17th century it is estimated that 2,500–3,000 people lived on Jamaica.

=== Early British period ===
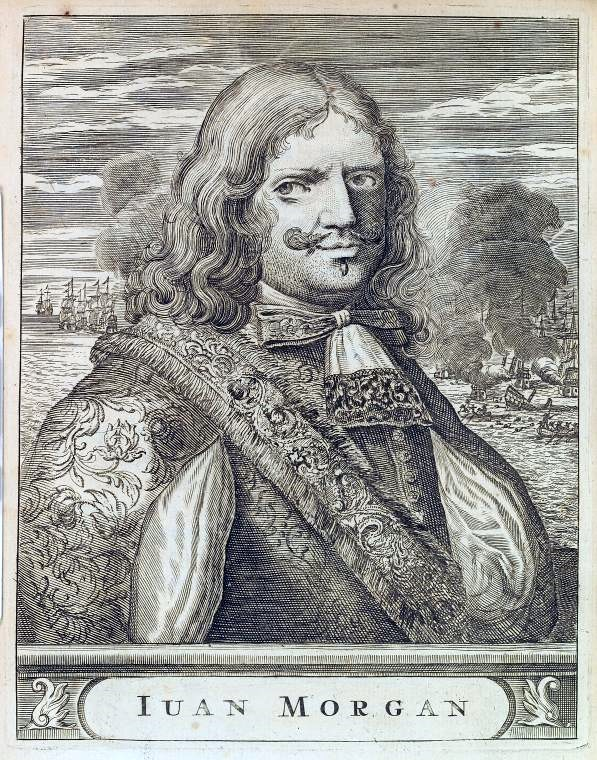
Henry Morgan was a Caribbean pirate, privateer, plantation owner and slaveholder. He first came to the West Indies as an indentured servant, like most of the early English colonists.

The English began taking an interest in the island, and following a failed attempt to conquer Santo Domingo on Hispaniola, Admiral William Penn and General Robert Venables led an invasion of Jamaica in 1655. Battles at Ocho Rios in 1657 and the Rio Nuevo in 1658 resulted in Spanish defeats; in 1660 the Maroon community under the leadership of Juan de Bolas switched sides from the Spanish and began supporting the English. With their help, the Spanish defeat was secured. In 1661 English civil government was formed, and Roundhead soldiers turned their attention to governance and agricultural responsibilities. When the English captured Jamaica, most Spanish colonists fled, with the exception of Spanish Jews. Spanish slave holders freed their slaves before leaving.

The Spanish made several attempts to re-capture the island, prompting the British to support pirates attacking Spanish ships in the Caribbean; as a result piracy became rampant on Jamaica, with Port Royal becoming notorious for its lawlessness. In 1670 Spain formally recognised English possession of the island with the Treaty of Madrid. After that, the English authorities sought to rein in the worst excesses of the pirates. During this period, Oliver Cromwell had begun to transport as many as Scottish prisoners of war from Scotland to Jamiaca. As a result, Scots played a significant role in the development of the island, being credited as "indentured and skilled labourers".

In 1660, the population was about 4,500 white and 1,500 black. By the early 1670s, as the English developed sugarcane plantations worked by large numbers of slaves, black Africans formed a majority of the population. The Irish in Jamaica also formed a large part of the early population, making up two-thirds of the white population, twice that of the English population. They were brought in as indentured labourers and soldiers after the conquest of 1655. The majority of Irish were transported by force as political prisoners of war from Ireland as a result of the ongoing Wars of the Three Kingdoms. Irish migration continued into the 18th century.

A limited form of local government was introduced with the creation of the House of Assembly of Jamaica in 1664; however, it represented only a tiny number of rich plantation owners. In 1692, the colony was rocked by an earthquake that resulted in several thousand deaths and the almost complete destruction of Port Royal.

=== 18th–19th centuries ===
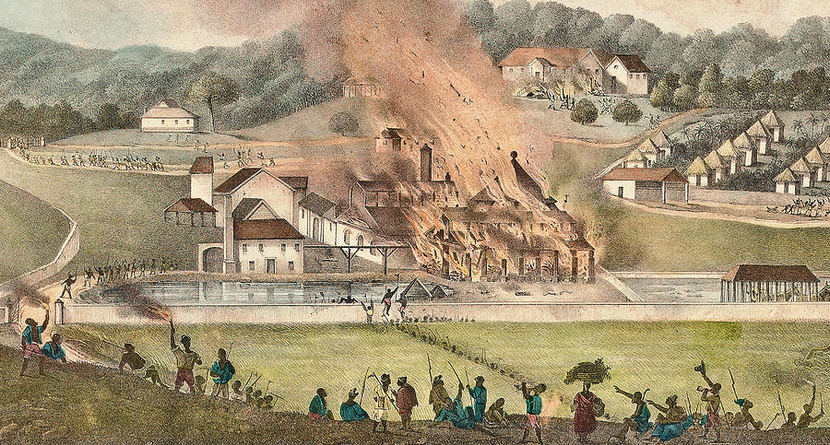
A plantation set alight during the Baptist War of 1831–32

During the 18th century the economy boomed, based largely on sugar and other crops for export such as coffee, cotton and indigo. All these crops were worked by black slaves, who lived short and often brutal lives with no rights, being the property of a small planter class. Slaves ran away and joined the Maroons in increasing numbers, resulting in The First Maroon War (1728 – 1740), which ended in stalemate. The British government sued for peace and signed treaties with the Leeward Maroons led by Cudjoe and Accompong in 1739, and the Windward Maroons led by Quao and Queen Nanny in 1740.

A large slave rebellion known as Tacky's Revolt broke out in 1760 but was defeated by the British and their Maroon allies. After the Second Maroon War in 1795–96, many Maroons of Cudjoe's Town (Trelawny Town) were expelled to Nova Scotia and Sierra Leone.

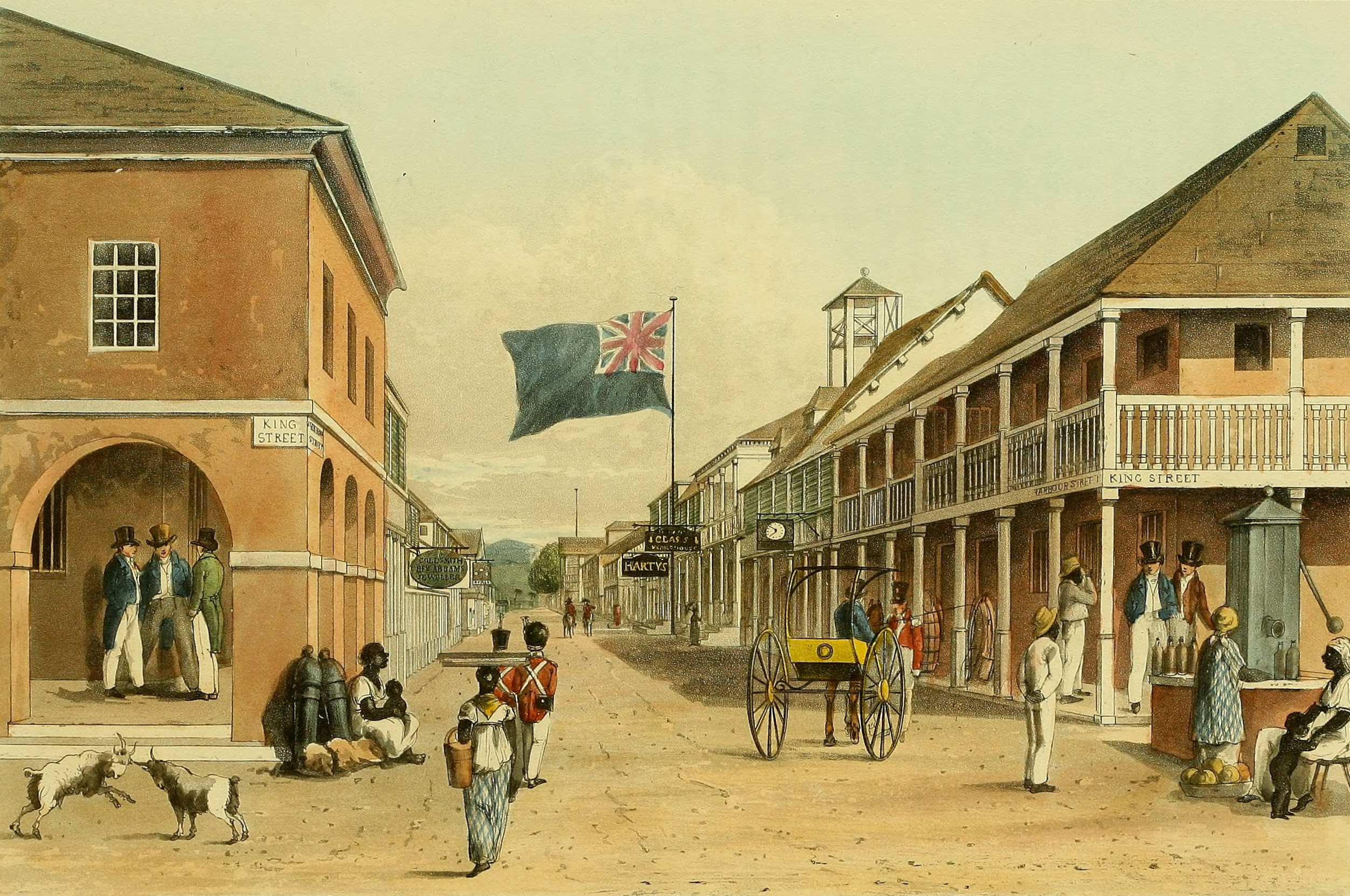
Harbour Street, Kingston, c. 1820

By the beginning of the 19th century, Jamaica's dependence on slave labour and a plantation economy had resulted in black people outnumbering white people by a ratio of almost 20 to 1. Although the British had outlawed the trade or transport of slaves in 1807, slaves and convicts continued to be smuggled out of Jamaica to other colonies such as Cuba. While planning the abolition of slavery, the British Parliament passed laws to improve conditions for slaves. They banned the use of whips in the field and flogging of women; informed planters that slaves were to be allowed religious instruction, and required a free day during each week when slaves could sell their produce, prohibiting Sunday markets to enable slaves to attend church. The House of Assembly in Jamaica resented and resisted the laws. Members, with membership restricted to European-descended Jamaicans, claimed that the slaves were content and objected to Parliament's interference in island affairs. Slave owners feared that improving conditions could encourage revolts.

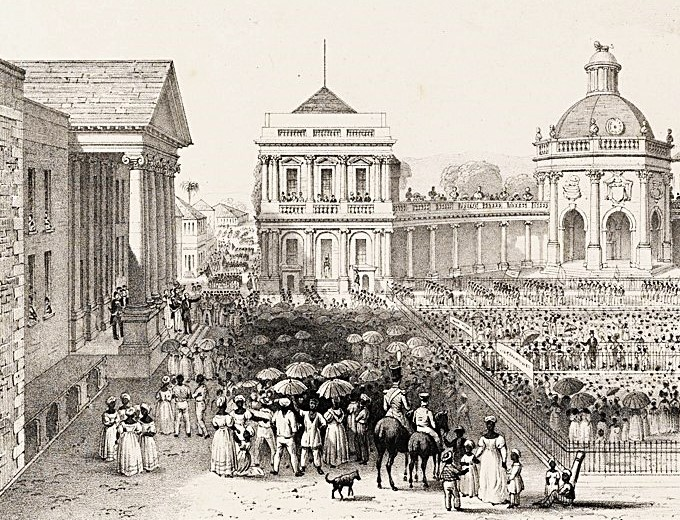
Governor Sir Lionel Smith, accompanied by Revd James Phillippo, proclaiming the abolition of slavery in the colony of Jamaica, on 1 August 1838, from the King's House in Spanish Town

The British abolished the slave trade in 1807, but not the institution itself. In 1831 a huge slave rebellion known as the Baptist War broke out, led by Baptist preacher Samuel Sharpe. The rebellion resulted in hundreds of deaths and the destruction of many plantations, and led to ferocious reprisals by the plantocracy class. As a result of rebellions such as these as well as the efforts of abolitionists, Britain outlawed slavery in its empire in 1834, with full emancipation from chattel slavery declared in 1838. The population in 1834 was 371,070, of whom 15,000 were white, 5,000 free black; 40,000 "coloured" or free people of colour (mixed race); and 311,070 were slaves.

The resulting labour shortage prompted the British to begin to "import" indentured servants to supplement the labour pool, as many freedmen resisted working on the plantations. Workers recruited from India began arriving in 1845, Chinese workers in 1854. Many Jamaicans are descendants of South Asian and Chinese people. Over the next 20 years, several epidemics of cholera, scarlet fever, and smallpox hit the island, killing almost 60,000 people, about 10 per day. Nevertheless, in 1871 the census recorded a population of 506,154 people, 246,573 of whom were males, and 259,581 females. Their races were recorded as 13,101 white, 100,346 coloured (known as the browning class), and 392,707 black.

There was an economic slump in this period, with many Jamaicans living in poverty. Dissatisfaction with this, and continued racial discrimination and marginalisation of the black majority, led to the outbreak of the Morant Bay rebellion in 1865 led by Paul Bogle, which was put down by Governor John Eyre with such brutality that he was recalled from his position. His successor, John Peter Grant, enacted a series of social, financial and political reforms while aiming to uphold firm British rule over the island, which became a Crown Colony in 1866. In 1872 the capital was transferred from Spanish Town to Kingston.

=== Early 20th century ===
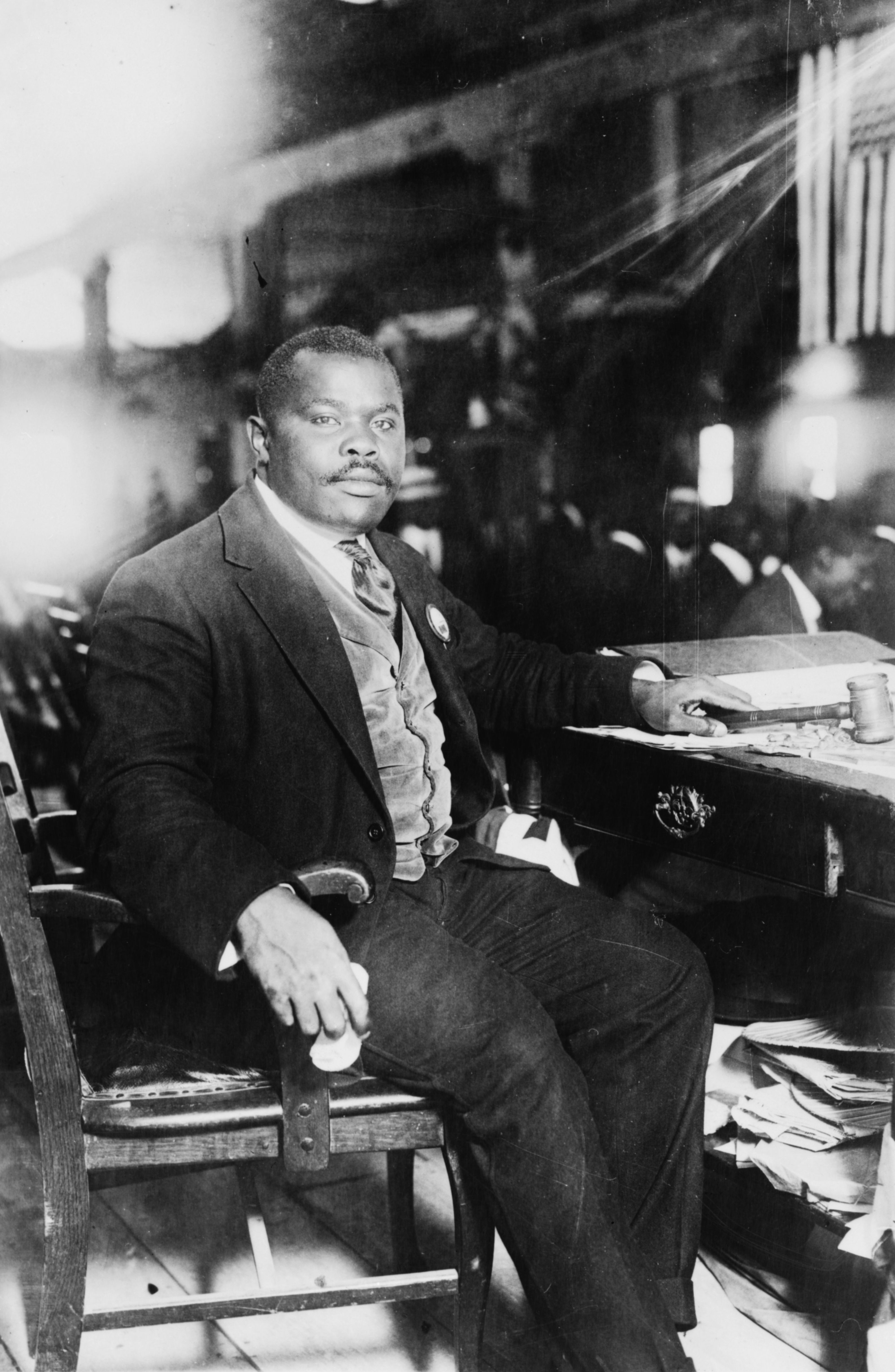
Marcus Garvey, father of the Back to Africa Movement and Jamaica's first National Hero

In 1907, Jamaica was struck by an earthquake which, together with the subsequent fire, resulted in considerable destruction in Kingston and caused the deaths of 800 to 1,000 people. Unemployment and poverty remained a problem for many Jamaicans. Various movements seeking political change arose as a result, most notably the Universal Negro Improvement Association and African Communities League founded by Marcus Garvey in 1917. As well as seeking greater political rights and an improvement for the condition of workers, Garvey was also a prominent Pan-Africanist and proponent of the Back-to-Africa movement. He was also one of the chief inspirations behind Rastafari, a religion founded in Jamaica in the 1930s that combined Christianity with an Afrocentric theology focused on the figure of Haile Selassie, Emperor of Ethiopia. Despite occasional persecution, Rastafari grew to become an established faith on the island and was spread abroad.

The Great Depression of the 1930s hit Jamaica hard. As part of the British West Indian labour unrest of 1934–39, Jamaica saw numerous strikes, culminating in a strike in 1938 that turned into a riot. As a result, the British government instituted a commission to look into the causes of the disturbances; their report recommended political and economic reforms in Britain's Caribbean colonies. A new House of Representatives was established in 1944, elected by universal adult suffrage. During this period Jamaica's two-party system emerged, with the creation of the Jamaican Labour Party (JLP) under Alexander Bustamante and the People's National Party (PNP) under Norman Manley.

Jamaica slowly gained increasing autonomy from the United Kingdom. In 1958 it became a province in the Federation of the West Indies, a federation of several of Britain's Caribbean colonies. Membership of the federation proved to be divisive, and a 1961 referendum on the issue saw a slight majority voting to leave. Jamaica attained full independence on 6 August 1962. The state retained its membership in the Commonwealth of Nations (with the British monarch as head of state) and adopted a Westminster-style parliamentary system. Bustamante became the first prime minister.

=== Post-independence era ===
Strong economic growth, averaging approximately 6% per year, marked the first ten years of independence under conservative JLP governments; these were led by successive prime ministers Bustamante, Donald Sangster (who died of natural causes within two months of taking office) and Hugh Shearer. The growth was fuelled by high levels of private investment in quarrying bauxite/alumina (aluminium ore), tourism, the manufacturing industry and, to a lesser extent, the agricultural sector. In the 1967 Jamaican general election, the JLP were victorious again, winning 33 out of 53 seats, with the PNP taking 20 seats. In terms of foreign policy Jamaica became a member of the Non-Aligned Movement, seeking to retain strong ties with Britain and the United States whilst also developing links with communist states such as Cuba.

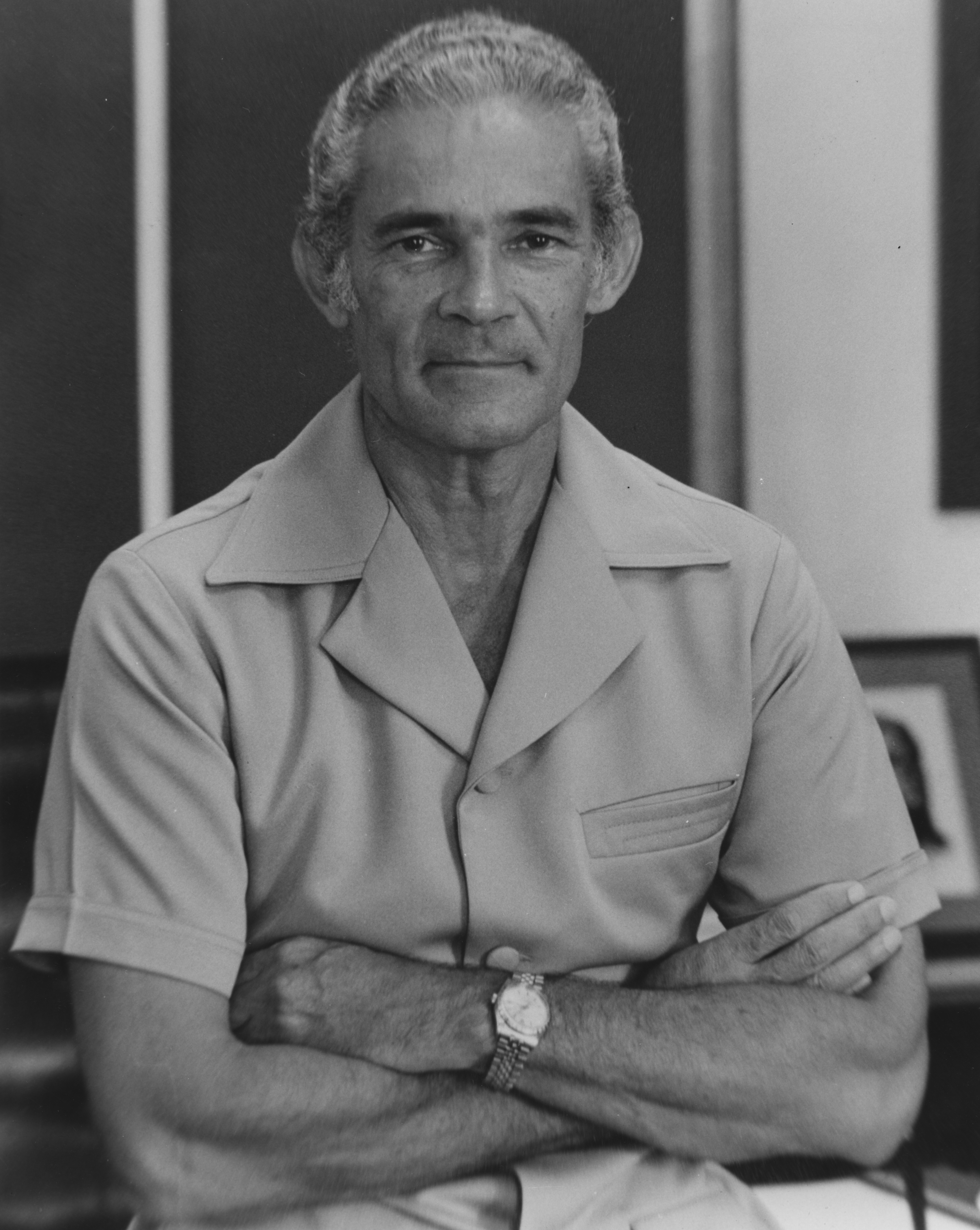
Michael Manley, Prime Minister 1972–1980 and 1989–1992

The optimism of the first decade was accompanied by a growing sense of inequality among many Afro-Jamaicans, and a concern that the benefits of growth were not being shared by the urban poor, many of whom ended up living in crime-ridden shanty towns in Kingston. This led to the voters electing the PNP under Michael Manley in 1972. The PNP won 37 seats to the JLP's 16. Manley's government enacted social reforms, such as a higher minimum wage, land reform, legislation for women's equality, greater housing construction and an increase in educational provision. Internationally he improved ties with the communist bloc and vigorously opposed the apartheid regime in South Africa.

In 1976, the PNP won another landslide, winning 47 seats to the JLP's 13. The turnout was a very high 85 percent. However, the economy faltered in this period due to a combination of internal and external factors (such as the oil shocks). The rivalry between the JLP and PNP became intense, and political and gang-related violence grew significantly in this period.

By 1980, the gross national product had declined to some 25% below its 1972 level. Seeking change, in 1980 Jamaicans voted the JLP back in under Edward Seaga, the JLP winning 51 seats to the PNP's nine seats. Firmly anti-communist, Seaga cut ties with Cuba and sent troops to support the US invasion of Grenada in 1983. The economic deterioration continued into the mid-1980s.

The largest and third-largest alumina producers, Alpart and Alcoa, closed. There was a significant reduction in production by the second-largest producer, Alcan. Reynolds Jamaica Mines, Ltd. left the Jamaican industry. There was also a decline in tourism, which was important to the economy. Owing to rising foreign and local debt, accompanied by large fiscal deficits, the government sought International Monetary Fund financing, which was dependent on implementing various austerity measures. These resulted in strikes in 1985 and a decline in support for the Seaga government, exacerbated by criticism of the government's response to the devastation caused by Hurricane Gilbert in 1988. Having de-emphasised socialism and adopting a more centrist position, Manley and the PNP were re-elected in 1989, winning 45 seats to the JLP's 15.

The PNP won a string of elections, under prime ministers Manley (1989–1992), P. J. Patterson (1992–2005) and Portia Simpson-Miller (2005–2007). In the 1993 Jamaican general election, Patterson led the PNP to victory, winning 52 seats to the JLP's eight seats. Patterson also won the 1997 Jamaican general election, by another landslide margin of 50 seats to the JLP's 10 seats. Patterson's third consecutive victory came in the 2002 Jamaican general election, when the PNP retained power but with a reduced seat majority of 34 seats to 26. Patterson stepped down in 2006 and was replaced by Simpson-Miller. Voter turnout slowly declined during this period, from 67.4% in 1993 to 59.1% in 2002.

During this period various economic reforms were introduced, such as deregulating the finance sector and floating the Jamaican dollar, as well as greater investment in infrastructure, whilst also retaining a strong social safety net. Political violence, so prevalent in the previous two decades, declined significantly. In the 2007 election the PNP was defeated by the JLP by a narrow margin of 32 seats to 28, with a turnout of 61.46%. This election ended 18 years of PNP rule, and Bruce Golding became prime minister. Golding's tenure (2007–2010) was dominated by the effects of the global recession, as well as the fallout from an attempt by Jamaican police and military to arrest drug lord Christopher Coke in 2010 which erupted in violence, resulting in over 70 deaths. As a result of this incident Golding resigned and was replaced by Andrew Holness in 2011.

Independence, however widely celebrated in Jamaica, has been questioned in the early 21st century. A 2011 survey shows that approximately 60% of Jamaicans believe that the country would have been better off had it remained a British colony, with only 17% believing it would have been worse off, citing as problems years of social and fiscal mismanagement in the country.

Holness and the JLP were defeated in the 2011 Jamaican general election, in which Simpson-Miller and the PNP returned to power. The number of seats had been increased to 63, and the PNP swept to power with a landslide 42 seats to the JLP's 21. The voter turnout was 53.17%. Holness's JLP won the 2016 general election narrowly, defeating Simpson-Miller's PNP, on 25 February. The PNP won 31 seats to the JLP's 32. The voter turnout dipped below 50% for the first time, registering just 48.37%. In the 2020 general election, Holness secured a second consecutive win for the JLP, winning 49 seats to 14 won by the PNP, led this time by Peter Phillips. The last time a consecutive win occurred for the JLP was in 1980. The turnout at the election was 37%, probably affected by the coronavirus pandemic. However, this low turnout was a trend that continued in subsequent elections.

In the 2025 Jamaican general election, Holness secured a third consecutive term for the JLP, the first time the party had won three general elections in a row. The JLP won 34 seats to the 29 by the Mark Golding led PNP. The turnout was low at 39.5%.

== Geography ==
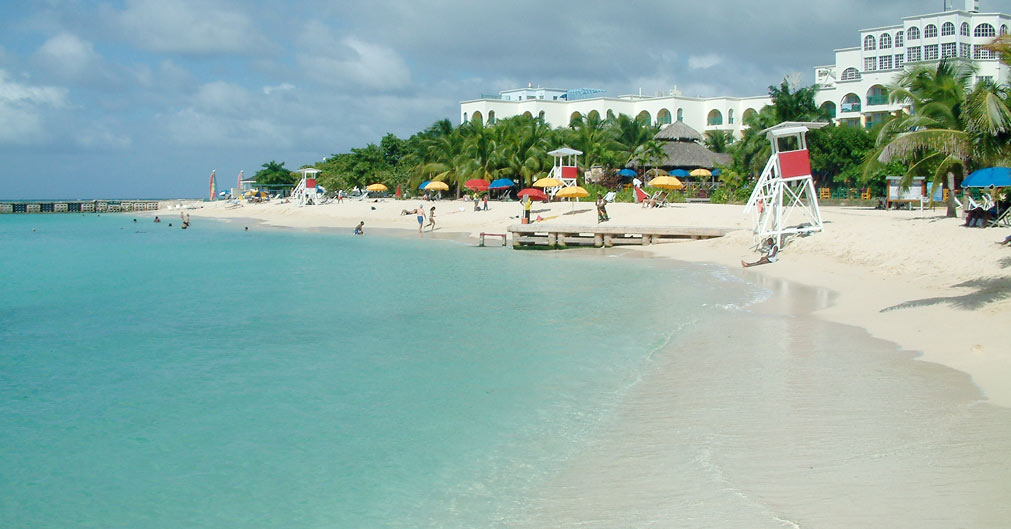
Doctor's Cave Beach Club is a popular destination in Montego Bay.

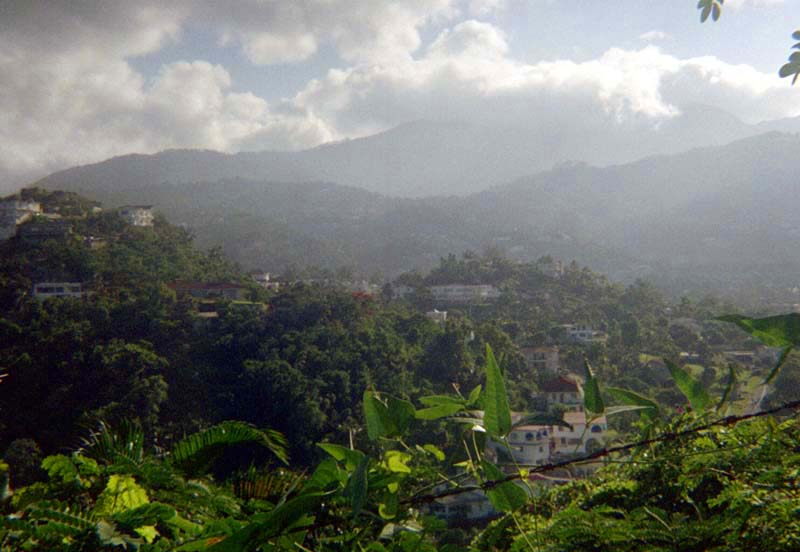
The Blue Mountains

Jamaica is the third-largest island in the Caribbean. It lies between latitudes 17° and 19°N, and longitudes 76° and 79°W. Mountains dominate the interior: the Don Figuerero, Santa Cruz, and May Day mountains in the west, the Dry Harbour Mountains in the centre, and the John Crow Mountains and Blue Mountains in the east, the latter containing Blue Mountain Peak, Jamaica's tallest mountain at 2,256 m. They are surrounded by a narrow coastal plain. Blue Lagoon in Portland Parish is a dormant volcano's crater.

Among the variety of terrestrial, aquatic and marine ecosystems are dry and wet limestone forests, rainforest, riparian woodland, wetlands, caves, rivers, seagrass beds and coral reefs. Protected areas include the Cockpit Country, Hellshire Hills, and Litchfield forest reserves, as well as the Portland Bight Protected Area. A marine park covering nearly 15 square kilometres (5.8 sq mi) is in Montego Bay. Blue and John Crow Mountains National Park covers roughly 300 square miles (780 km^{2}) of a wilderness area which supports thousands of tree and fern species as well as rare animals.

There are several small islands, most notably in Portland Bight such as Pigeon Island, Salt Island, Dolphin Island, Long Island, Great Goat Island and Little Goat Island, and also Lime Cay located further east. Much further out – some 50–80 km off the south coast – lie the very small Morant Cays and Pedro Cays.

=== Climate ===
Köppen climate classification of Jamaica

The climate is tropical, with hot and humid weather, although higher inland regions are more temperate. Some regions on the south coast, such as the Liguanea Plain and the Pedro Plains, are relatively dry rain-shadow areas.

Jamaica lies within the main development region for Atlantic tropical cyclone activity, and because of this, the island sometimes suffers significant storm damage. Hurricanes Charlie and Gilbert hit Jamaica directly in 1951 and 1988, respectively, causing major damage and many deaths. In the 2000s, hurricanes Ivan, Dean, and Gustav impacted the island. In 2025, Hurricane Melissa made landfall as a Category 5, far surpassing Gilbert as the strongest landfalling storm in Jamaican history.

=== Flora and fauna ===
Jamaica's national bird, a red-billed streamertail

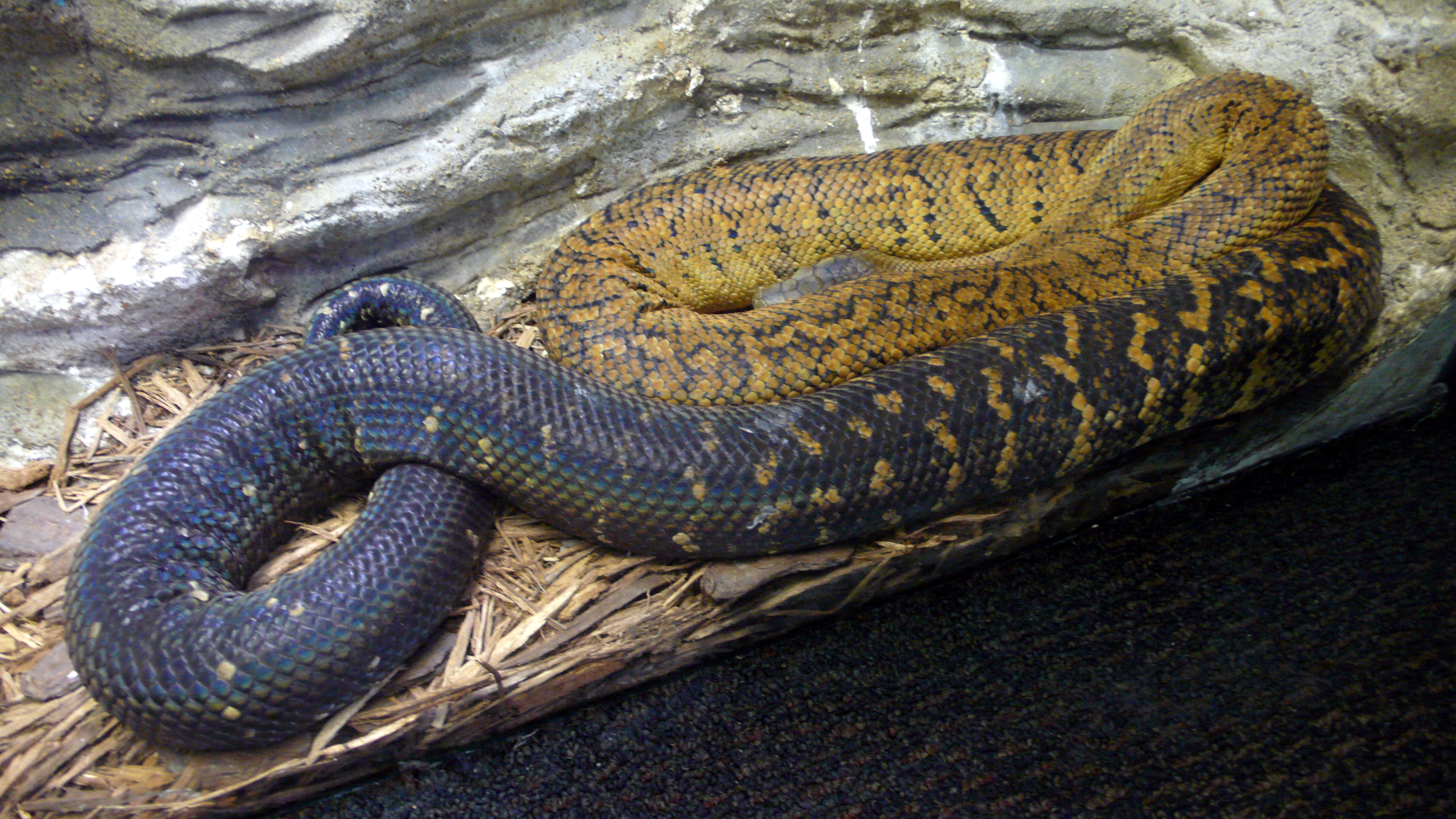
A Jamaican boa

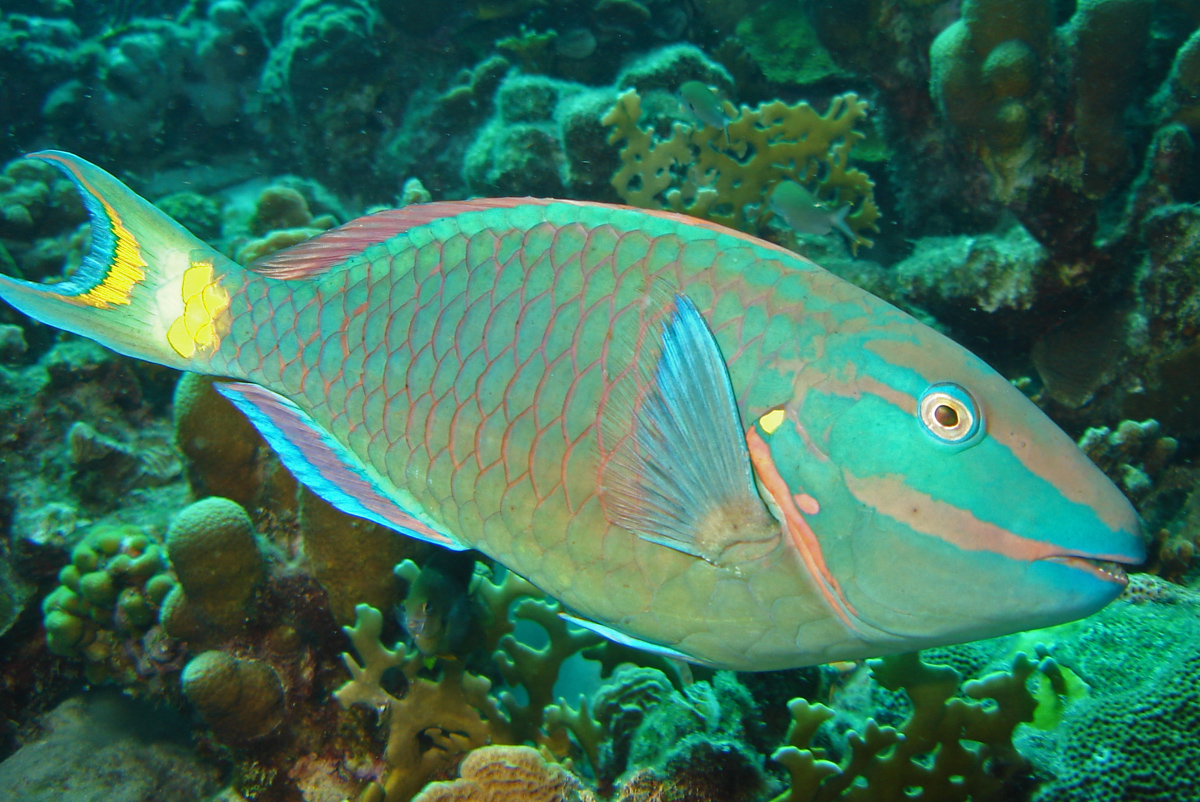
A Jamaican parrotfish

The tropical climate supports diverse ecosystems with a wealth of plants and animals. Plant life has changed considerably over the centuries; when the Spanish arrived in 1494, except for small agricultural clearings, the country was deeply forested. The European settlers cleared the timber for building and ships' supplies, and cleared the plains, savannas, and mountain slopes for intense agricultural cultivation. Many plants were introduced including sugarcane, bananas, and citrus trees.

There are about 3,000 species of native flowering plants (of which over 1,000 are endemic and 200 are species of orchid), thousands of species of non-flowering flora, and about 20 botanical gardens, some of which are several hundred years old. Areas of heavy rainfall also contain stands of bamboo, ferns, ebony, mahogany, and rosewood. Cactus and similar dry-area plants are found along the south and southwest coasts. Parts of the west and southwest consist of large grasslands, with scattered stands of trees. The ecoregions include the Jamaican moist forests, Jamaican dry forests, and Greater Antilles mangroves.

Fauna is typical of the Caribbean and included highly diversified wildlife with many endemic species. As with other oceanic islands, mammals are mostly several species of bats of which at least three endemic species are found only in Cockpit Country, one of which is at risk. Other species of bat include the fig-eating and hairy-tailed bats. The only non-bat native mammal extant in Jamaica is the Jamaican hutia, locally known as the coney. Introduced mammals such as wild boar and the small Asian mongoose are also common.

There are about 50 species of reptiles, the largest of which is the American crocodile; however, it is only present within the Black River and a few other areas. Lizards such as anoles, iguanas and snakes such as racers and the Jamaican boa (the largest snake on the island) are common in areas such as the Cockpit Country. None of the eight species of native snakes is venomous. One species of freshwater turtle is native to Jamaica, the Jamaican slider. It is found only on Jamaica and on a few islands in the Bahamas. Many types of frogs are common on the island, especially treefrogs.

There are about 289 species of birds, of which 27 are endemic including the endangered black-Billed parrots and the Jamaican blackbird, both of which are only found in Cockpit Country. There are four endemic species of hummingbirds (three of which are found nowhere else in the world): the black-billed streamertail, the Jamaican mango, the Vervain hummingbird, and red-billed streamertails. The red-billed streamertail, known locally as the "doctor bird", is Jamaica's National Symbol. Other notable species include the Jamaican tody and the greater flamingo.

Jamaican waters contain considerable resources of fresh and saltwater fish. The chief varieties of saltwater fish are kingfish, jack, mackerel, whiting, bonito, and tuna. Dolphins, parrotfish, and the endangered manatee are also common. Fish that occasionally enter freshwater and estuarine environments include snook, jewfish, mangrove snapper, and mullet. Fresh water fish include many species of livebearers, killifish, freshwater gobies, mountain mullet, and American eel. Tilapia have been introduced from Africa for aquaculture and are very common.

Insects and other invertebrates are abundant, including the world's largest centipede, the Amazonian giant centipede. There are about 150 species of butterflies and moths, including 35 endemic species and 22 subspecies. The Jamaican swallowtail is the western hemisphere's largest butterfly.

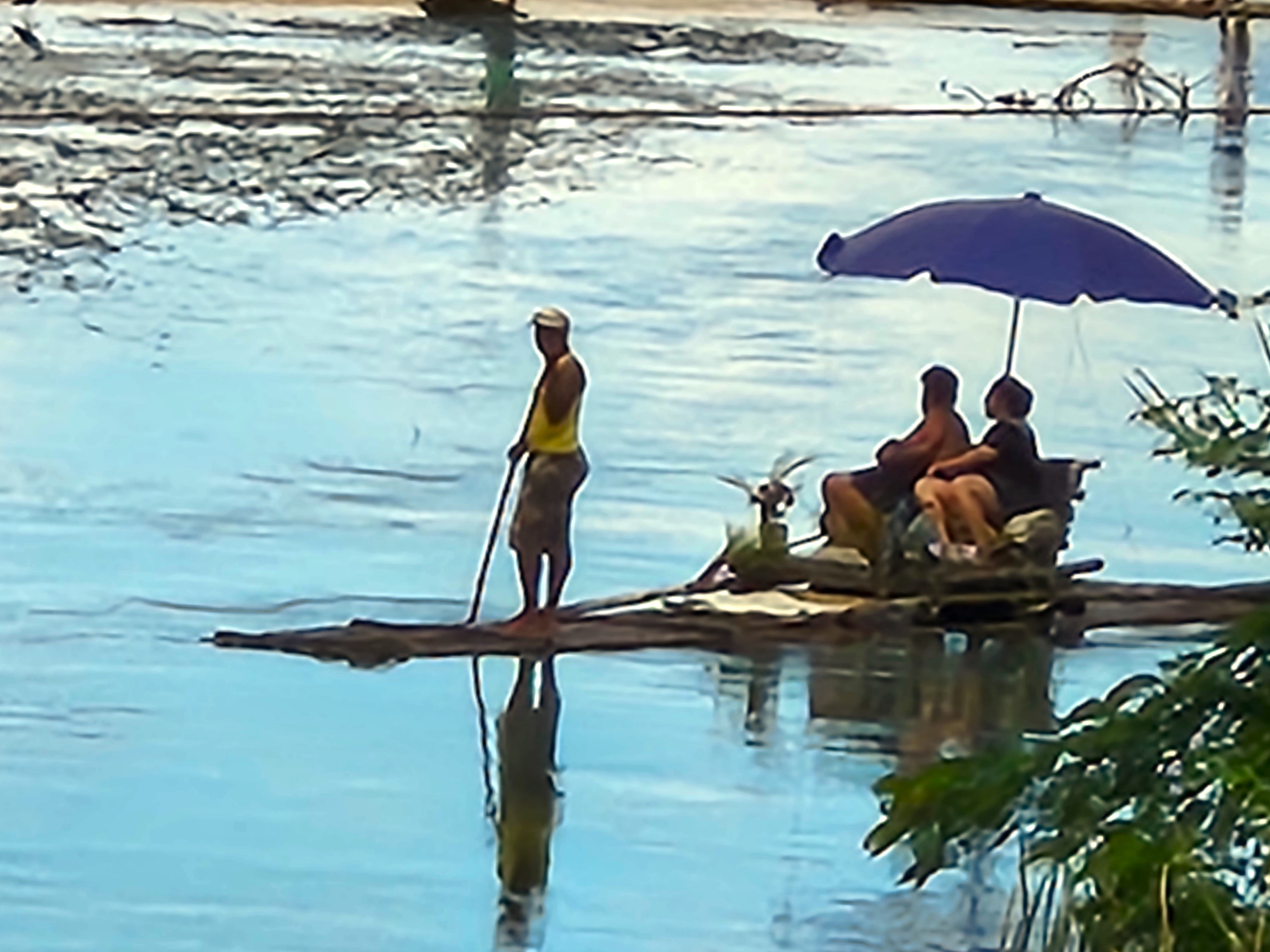
White River Rafting

Coral reef ecosystems are important because they provide people with a source of livelihood, food, recreation, and medicinal compounds and protect the land on which they live. Jamaica relies on the ocean and its ecosystem for its development. Jamaica's geological origin, topographical features, and seasonal high rainfall make it susceptible to a range of natural hazards that can affect the coastal and oceanic environments. These include storm surge, slope failures (landslides), earthquakes, floods and hurricanes. Coral reefs in the Negril Marine Park have been increasingly impacted by nutrient pollution and macroalgal blooms following decades of intensive development as a major tourist destination.

=== Pollution ===
Pollution comes from run-off, sewage systems, and garbage. This typically all ends up in the ocean after there is rain or floods. Poor coastal water quality has adversely affected fisheries, tourism and mariculture, as well as undermining biological sustainability of the living resources of ocean and coastal habitats. Solid waste disposal mechanisms in Jamaica are currently inadequate. The solid waste gets into the water through rainfall forces. Solid waste is harmful to wildlife, particularly birds, fish and turtles that feed at the surface of the water. Each Jamaican generates 1 kg (2 lbs) of waste per day; about 70% of this is collected by National Solid Waste Management Authority—the remaining 30% is either burnt or disposed of in gullies/waterways.

== Government and politics ==
Charles III
King

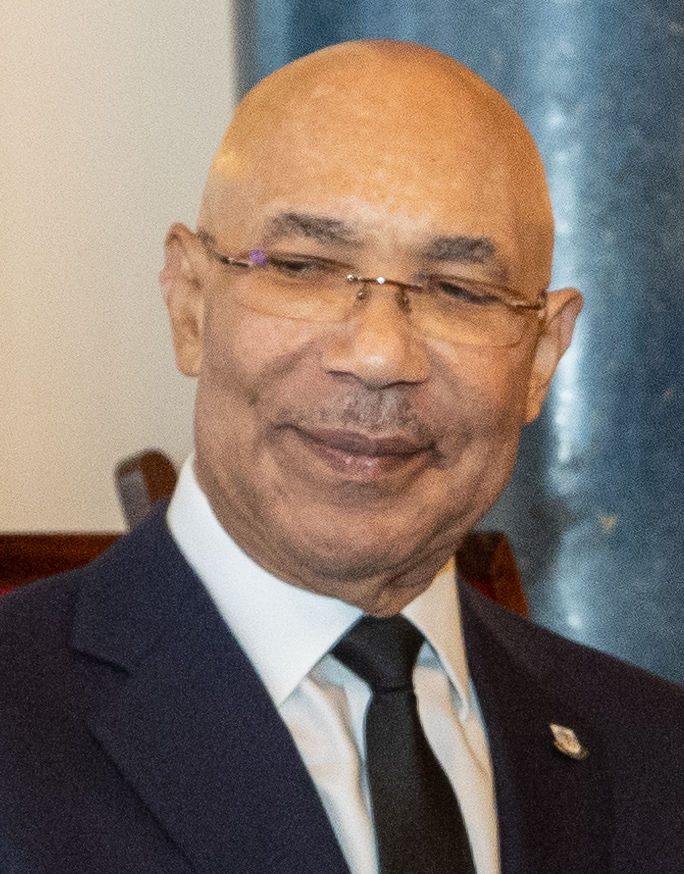
Patrick Allen
Governor-General

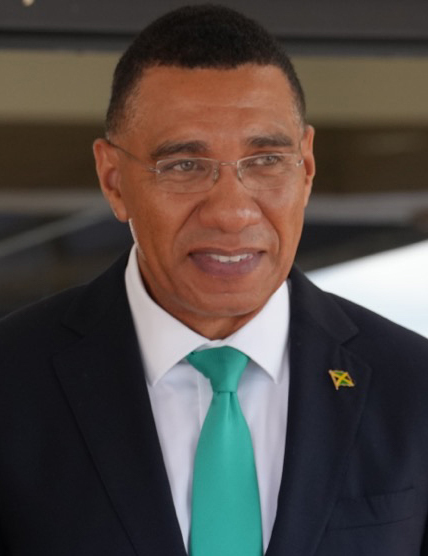
Andrew Holness
Prime Minister

Jamaica is a parliamentary democracy and constitutional monarchy. The head of state is the King of Jamaica (currently King Charles III), represented locally by the Governor-General of Jamaica. The governor-general is nominated by the prime minister of Jamaica and the entire Cabinet and then formally appointed by the monarch. All the members of the Cabinet are appointed by the governor-general on the advice of the prime minister.

The monarch and the governor-general serve largely ceremonial roles, apart from their reserve powers for use in certain constitutional crisis situations. The position of the monarch has been a matter of continuing debate in Jamaica for many years; currently both major political parties are committed to transitioning to a republic with a president.

Jamaica's current constitution was drafted in 1962 by a bipartisan joint committee of the Jamaican legislature. It came into force with the Jamaica Independence Act, 1962, which was passed by the Parliament of the United Kingdom, which gave Jamaica independence.

The Parliament of Jamaica is bicameral, consisting of the House of Representatives (Lower House) and the Senate (Upper House). Members of the House (known as Members of Parliament or MPs) are directly elected, and the member of the House of Representatives who, in the governor-general's best judgement, is best able to command the confidence of a majority of the members of that House, is appointed by the governor-general to be the prime minister. Senators are nominated jointly by the prime minister and the parliamentary Leader of the Opposition and are then appointed by the governor-general.

The Judiciary of Jamaica operates on a common law system derived from English law and Commonwealth of Nations precedents. The court of final appeal is the Judicial Committee of the Privy Council, a court of the British Crown based in London. A proposal has been made to replace the Privy Council with the Caribbean Court of Justice as part of a wider push toward full decolonization.

=== Political parties and elections ===
Jamaica has traditionally had a two-party system, with power often alternating between the People's National Party (PNP) and Jamaica Labour Party (JLP). The party with current administrative and legislative power is the Jamaica Labour Party, after its 2020 victory. There are also several minor parties who have yet to gain a seat in parliament; the largest of these is the National Democratic Movement (NDM).

=== Administrative divisions ===
Jamaica is divided into 14 parishes, which are grouped into three historic counties that have no administrative relevance.

In the context of local government the parishes are designated "Local Authorities". These local authorities are further styled as "Municipal Corporations", which are either city municipalities or town municipalities. Any new city municipality must have a population of at least 50,000, and a town municipality a number set by the Minister of Local Government. There are currently no town municipalities.

The local governments of the parishes of Kingston and St. Andrews are consolidated as the city municipality of Kingston & St. Andrew Municipal Corporation. The newest city municipality is the Municipality of Portmore, created 2003. While it is geographically located within the parish of St. Catherine, it is governed independently.

Kingston is the capital city and centre of business and is located on the south coast, and Montego Bay is one of the best known cities in the Caribbean for tourism, located on the north coast. Kingston Harbour is the seventh-largest natural harbour in the world, which contributed to the city being designated as the capital in 1872.

Cornwall County		Capital	km^{2}	Middlesex County		Capital	km^{2}	Surrey County		Capital	km^{2}
1	Hanover	Lucea	450	6	Clarendon	May Pen	1,196	11	Kingston	Kingston	25
2	St. Elizabeth	Black River	1,212	7	Manchester	Mandeville	830	12	Portland	Port Antonio	814
3	St. James	Montego Bay	595	8	St. Ann	St. Ann's Bay	1,213	13	St. Andrew	Half Way Tree	453
4	Trelawny	Falmouth	875	9	St. Catherine	Spanish Town	1,192	14	St. Thomas	Morant Bay	743
5	Westmoreland	Savanna-la-Mar	807	10	St. Mary	Port Maria	611				

=== Military ===
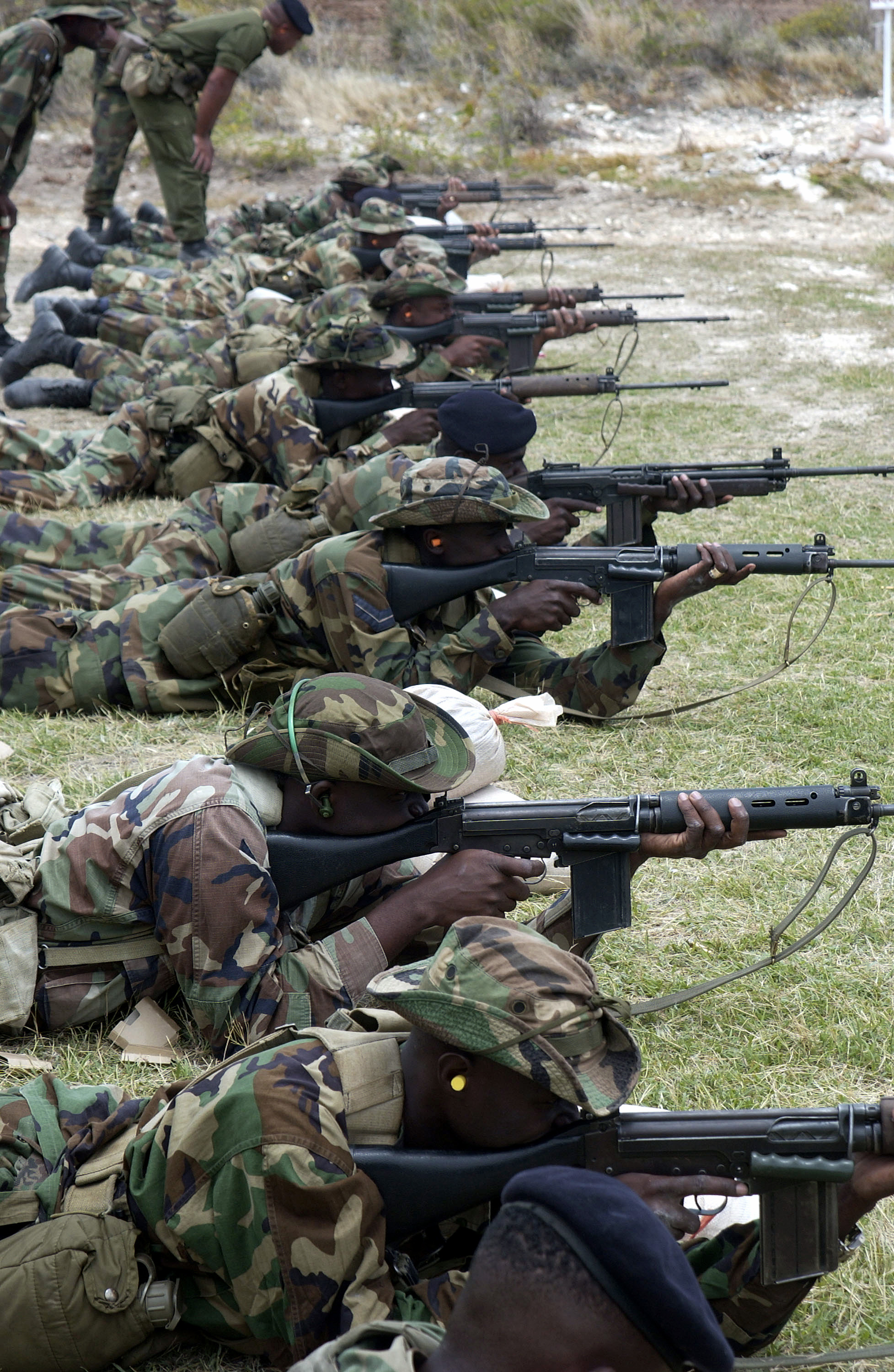
Jamaican soldiers training to fire the L1A1 Self-Loading Rifle in 2002

The Jamaica Defence Force (JDF) is the small but professional military force of Jamaica. The JDF is based on the British military model with similar organisation, training, weapons and traditions. Once chosen, officer candidates are sent to one of several British or Canadian basic officer courses depending on the arm of service. Enlisted soldiers are given basic training at Up Park Camp or JDF Training Depot, Newcastle, both in St. Andrew. As with the British model, NCOs are given several levels of professional training as they rise up the ranks. Additional military schools are available for speciality training in Canada, the United States and the United Kingdom.

The JDF is directly descended from the British Army's West India Regiment, which was formed during the colonial era. The West India Regiment was used extensively throughout the British Empire in policing the empire from 1795 to 1926. Other units in the JDF heritage include the early colonial Jamaica Militia, the Kingston Infantry Volunteers of WWI and reorganised into the Jamaican Infantry Volunteers in World War II. The West Indies Regiment was reformed in 1958 as part of the West Indies Federation, after dissolution of the Federation the JDF was established.

The Jamaica Defence Force (JDF) comprises an infantry Regiment and Reserve Corps, an Air Wing, a Coast Guard fleet and a supporting Engineering Unit. The infantry regiment contains the 1st, 2nd and 3rd (National Reserve) battalions. The JDF Air Wing is divided into three flight units, a training unit, a support unit and the JDF Air Wing (National Reserve). The Coast Guard is divided between seagoing crews and support crews who conduct maritime safety and maritime law enforcement as well as defence-related operations.

The role of the support battalion is to provide support to boost numbers in combat and issue competency training in order to allow for the readiness of the force. The 1st Engineer Regiment was formed due to an increased demand for military engineers and their role is to provide engineering services whenever and wherever they are needed. The Headquarters JDF contains the JDF Commander, Command Staff as well as Intelligence, Judge Advocate office, Administrative and Procurement sections.

In recent years the JDF has been called on to assist the nation's police, the Jamaica Constabulary Force (JCF), in fighting drug smuggling and a rising crime rate which includes one of the highest murder rates in the world. JDF units actively conduct armed patrols with the JCF in high-crime areas and known gang neighbourhoods. There has been vocal controversy as well as support of this JDF role. In early 2005, an Opposition leader, Edward Seaga, called for the merger of the JDF and JCF. This has not garnered support in either organisation nor among the majority of citizens. In 2017, Jamaica signed the UN treaty on the Prohibition of Nuclear Weapons. In September 2024 the AP reported that "20 soldiers and four police officers are scheduled to arrive in Haiti to support the UN-Kenya lead mission and they would provide command, planning and logistics support." Jamaica's PM had pledged a total of 170 soldiers and 30 police officers, but said that all would not deploy at once.

== Economy ==
Jamaica is a mixed economy with both state enterprises and private sector businesses. Major sectors of the Jamaican economy include agriculture, mining, manufacturing, tourism, petroleum refining, financial and insurance services. Tourism and mining are the leading earners of foreign exchange. Half the Jamaican economy relies on services, with half of its income coming from services such as tourism. An estimated 4.3 million foreign tourists visit Jamaica every year. According to the World Bank, Jamaica is an upper-middle income country that, like its Caribbean neighbours, is vulnerable to the effects of climate change, flooding, and hurricanes. In 2018, Jamaica represented the CARICOM Caribbean Community at the G20 and the G7 annual meetings. In 2019 Jamaica reported its lowest unemployment rate in 50 years.

Supported by multilateral financial institutions, Jamaica has, since the early 1980s, sought to implement structural reforms aimed at fostering private sector activity and increasing the role of market forces in resource allocation Since 1991, the government has followed a programme of economic liberalisation and stabilisation by removing exchange controls, floating the exchange rate, cutting tariffs, stabilising the Jamaican dollar, reducing inflation and removing restrictions on foreign investment.

Emphasis has been placed upon maintaining strict fiscal discipline, greater openness to trade and financial flows, market liberalisation and reduction in the size of government. During this period, a large share of the economy was returned to private sector ownership through divestment and privatisation programmes. The free-trade zones at Kingston, Montego Bay and Spanish Town allow duty-free importation, tax-free profits, and free repatriation of export earnings.

=== Post–independence ===
Jamaica's economy grew strongly after the years of independence, but then stagnated in the 1980s, due to the heavy falls in price of bauxite and fluctuations in the price of agriculture. The financial sector was troubled in 1994, with many banks and insurance companies suffering heavy losses and liquidity problems. According to the Commonwealth Secretariat, "The government set up the Financial Sector Adjustment Company (Finsac) in January 1997 to assist these banks and companies, providing funds in return for equity, and acquired substantial holdings in banks and insurance companies and related companies..." but it only exasperated the problem, and brought the country into large external debt. From 2001, once it had restored these banks and companies to financial health, Finsac divested them." The Government of Jamaica remains committed to lowering inflation, with a long-term objective of bringing it in line with that of its major trading partners.

In 1996 and 1997 there was a decrease in GDP largely due to significant problems in the financial sector and, in 1997, a severe island-wide drought (the worst in 70 years) and hurricane that drastically reduced agricultural production. In 1997 and 1998, nominal GDP was approximately a high of about 8 percent of GDP and then lowered to 4½ percent of GDP in 1999 and 2000. The economy in 1997 was marked by low levels of import growth, high levels of private capital inflows and relative stability in the foreign exchange market.

=== Recent advancements ===
Recent economic performance shows the Jamaican economy is recovering. Agricultural production, an important engine of growth increased to 5.5% in 2001 compared to the corresponding period in 2000, signalling the first positive growth rate in the sector since January 1997. In 2018, Jamaica reported a 7.9% increase in corn, 6.1% increase in plantains, 10.4% increase in bananas, 2.2% increase in pineapples, 13.3% increase in dasheen, 24.9% increase in coconuts, and a 10.6% increase in whole milk production.

Bauxite and alumina production increased 5.5% from January to December 1998, compared to the corresponding period in 1997. January's bauxite production recorded a 7.1% increase relative to January 1998 and continued expansion of alumina production through 2009 is planned by Alcoa. Jamaica is the fifth-largest exporter of bauxite in the world, after Australia, China, Brazil and Guinea. The country also exports limestone, of which it holds large deposits. The government is currently implementing plans to increase its extraction.

=== Tourism industry ===
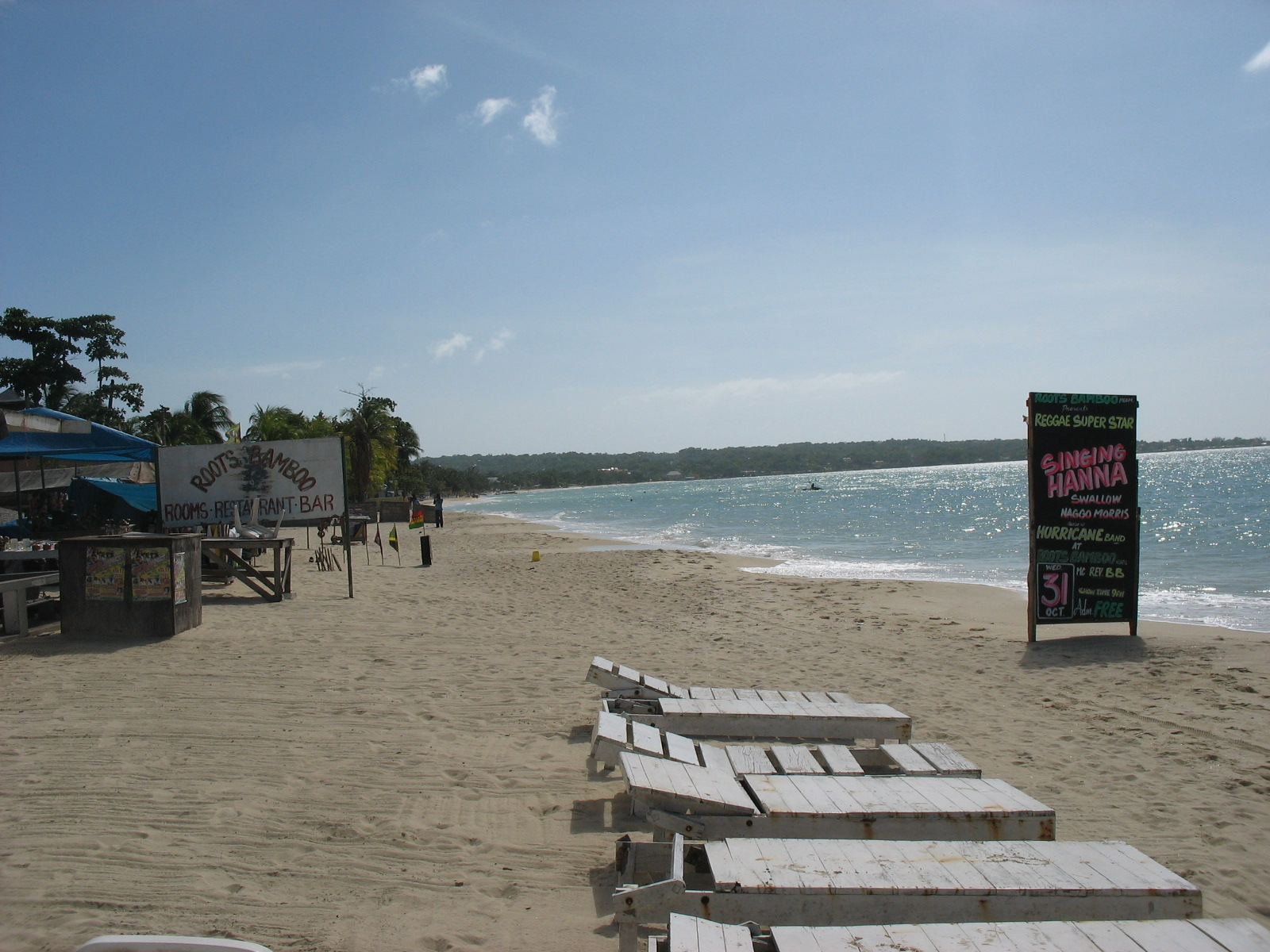
A beach in Negril with a hotel and restaurant

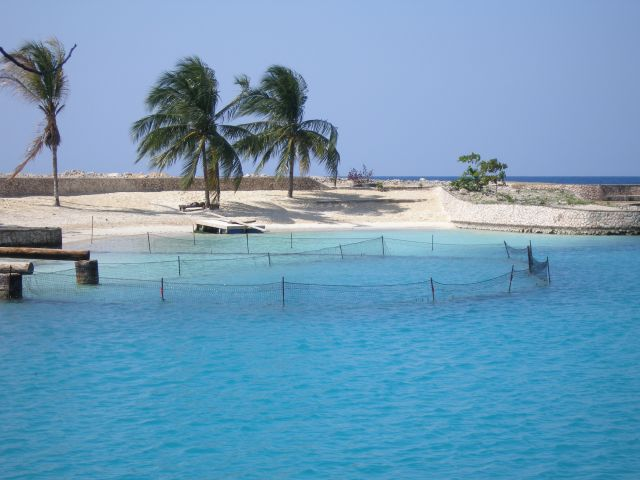
James Bond Beach in Oracabessa

Tourism, which is the largest foreign exchange earner, showed improvement as well. In 1999 the total visitor arrivals was 2 million, an increase of 100,000 from the previous year. Since 2017, Jamaica's tourism has risen exponentially, rising to 4.3 million average tourists per year. Jamaica's largest tourist markets are from North America, South America, and Europe. In 2017, Jamaica recorded a 91.3% increase in stopover visitors from Southern and Western Europe (and a 41% increase in stopover arrivals from January to September 2017 over the same period from the previous year) with Germany, Portugal and Spain registering the highest percentage gains.

In 2018, Jamaica won several World Travel Awards in Portugal winning the "Chairman's Award for Global Tourism Innovation", "Best Tourist Board in the Caribbean" "Best Honeymoon Destination", "Best Culinary Destination", "World's Leading Beach Destination" and "World's Leading Cruise Destination". Two months later, the Travvy Tourism Awards held in New York City, awarded Jamaica's Tourism Minister Edmund Bartlett, with the inaugural Chairman's Award for, "Global Tourism Innovation for the Development of the Global Tourism Resilience and Crisis Management Centre (GTRCM)". Bartlett has also won the Pacific Travel Writer's Association's award in Germany for the, "2018 Best Tourism Minister of the Year".

=== Industries ===
Jamaica's agricultural exports are sugar, bananas, cocoa, coconut, molasses oranges, limes, grapefruit, rum, yams, allspice (of which it is the world's largest and "most exceptional quality" exporter), and Blue Mountain Coffee which is considered a world renowned gourmet brand.

Jamaica has a wide variety of industrial and commercial activities. The aviation industry is able to perform most routine aircraft maintenance, except for heavy structural repairs. There is a considerable amount of technical support for transport and agricultural aviation. Jamaica has a considerable amount of industrial engineering, light manufacturing, including metal fabrication, metal roofing, and furniture manufacturing. Food and beverage processing, glassware manufacturing, software and data processing, printing and publishing, insurance underwriting, music and recording, and advanced education activities can be found in the larger urban areas. The Jamaican construction industry is entirely self-sufficient, with professional technical standards and guidance.

=== Science and technology ===
The Science, Technology and Innovation (STI) sector is guided by the National Commission on Science and Technology (NCST) and the Scientific Research Council (SRC). Both operate under the Ministry of Science, Energy, Telecommunications and Transport (MSETT).

Since the 1990s, the government has set an agenda to push the development of science and technology in Jamaica. Despite some successes, such as the growth of the nutraceutical industry, it has been difficult to translate the results into domestic technologies, products and services – largely because of national budgetary constraints. However, with Jamaica's improved fiscal space, coming out of its recent IMF programme, the government has pledged to increase expenditure on research and development.

Jamaicans have made noteworthy scientific and medical contributions, including advancements in the study of kwashiorkor as well as the pioneering of treatments for paediatric sickle cell anaemia.

=== Transport ===
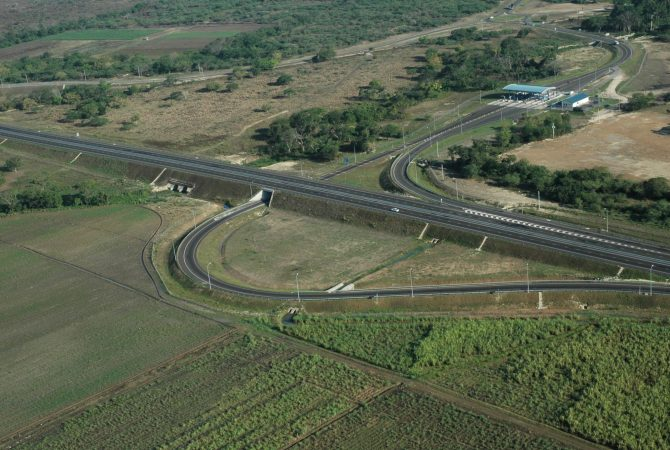
The Spanish Town interchange on the T1 motorway

The transport infrastructure in Jamaica consists of roadways, railways and air transport, with roadways forming the backbone of the island's internal transport system.

==== Roadways ====
The Jamaican road network consists of approximately 22,121 kilometres (13,745 mi) of roads, of which 16,148 kilometres (10,034 mi) is paved, in 2011. The Jamaican Government has, since 1999 and in cooperation with private investors, embarked on a campaign of infrastructural improvement projects under the Highway 2000 program, creating a system of tolled controlled-access highways, the first of their kind on the island, connecting the main population centres of the island. This project has, as of 2023, resulted in the completion of a total of approximately 149.7 kilometres (93.0 mi) of controlled-access highway, comprising the PJ Patterson Highway (T1), the Portmore Causeway (T2), and the Edward Seaga Highway (T3).

==== Railways ====
Railways in Jamaica no longer have the prominent position they once did, having been largely replaced by roadways as the primary means of transport. Of the 272 kilometres (169 mi) of railway in Jamaica, only 57 kilometres (35 mi) remain in operation, currently used to transport bauxite. In 2011, a limited passenger service was resumed between May Pen, Spanish Town and Linstead.

==== Air transport ====
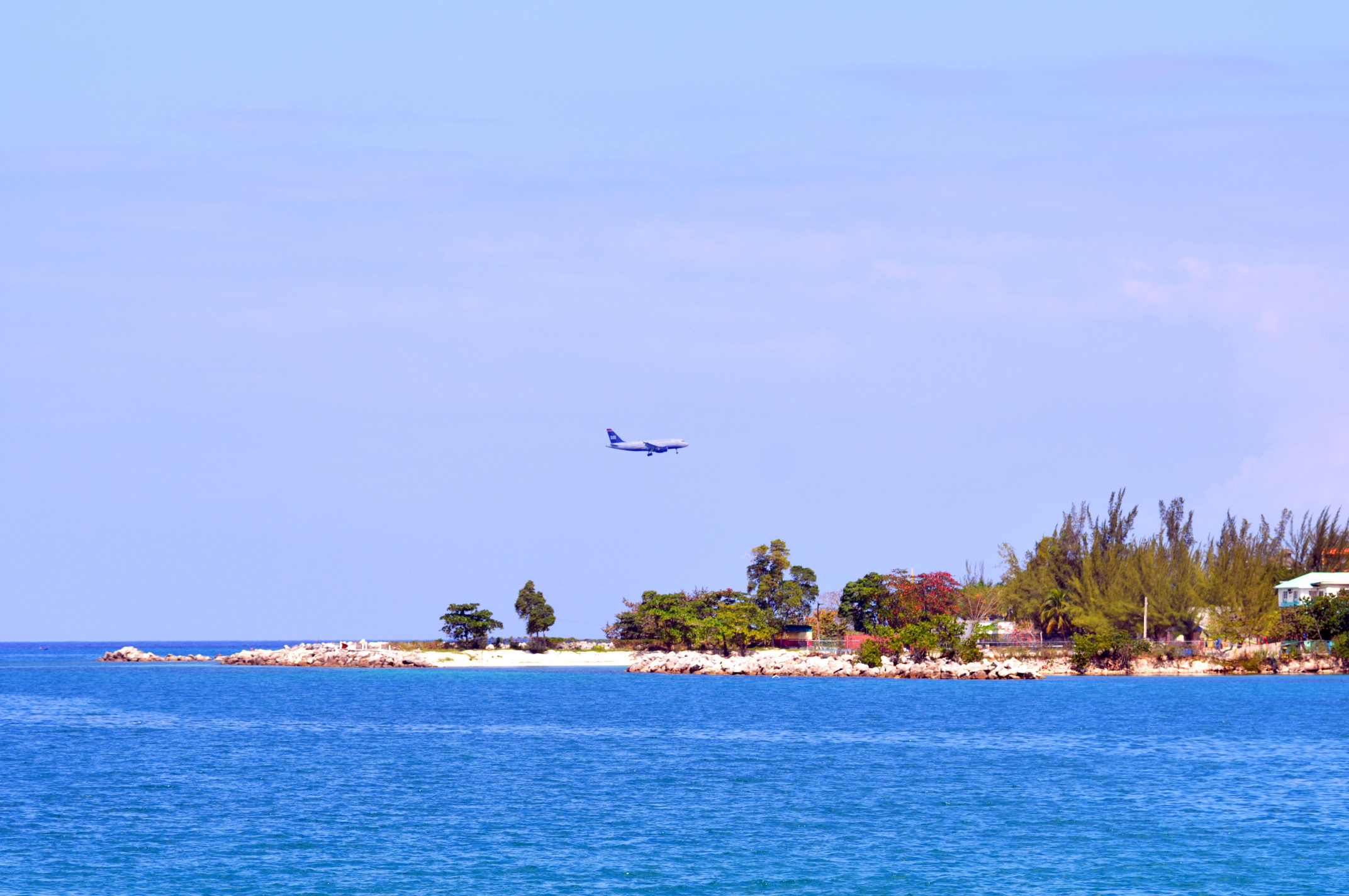
A US Airways aircraft landing at Montego Bay

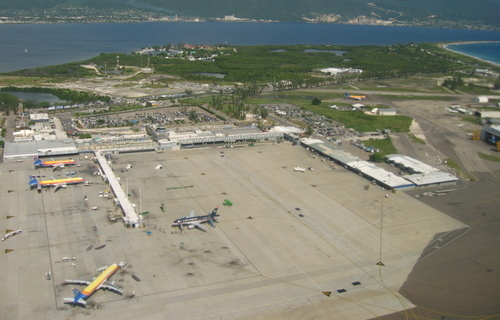
Norman Manley International Airport

There are three international airports in Jamaica with modern terminals, long runways, and the navigational equipment required to accommodate the large jet aircraft used in modern and air travel: Norman Manley International Airport in Kingston; Ian Fleming International Airport in Boscobel, Saint Mary Parish; and the island's largest and busiest airport, Sir Donald Sangster International Airport in the resort city of Montego Bay.

Manley and Sangster International airports are home to Jamaica's national airline, Caribbean Airlines. There are local commuter airports at Tinson Pen (Kingston), Port Antonio, and Negril, which cater to internal flights only. Many other small, rural centres are served by private airstrips on sugar estates or bauxite mines.

==== Ports, shipping and lighthouses ====
Owing to its location in the Caribbean Sea in the shipping lane to the Panama Canal and relative proximity to large markets in North America and emerging markets in Latin America, Jamaica receives much traffic of shipping containers. The container terminal at the Port of Kingston has undergone large expansion in capacity in recent years to handle growth both already realised as well as that which is projected in coming years. Montego Freeport in Montego Bay also handles a variety of cargo like (though more limited than) the Port of Kingston, mainly agricultural products.

There are several other ports positioned around the island, including Port Esquivel in St. Catherine (WINDALCO), Rocky Point in Clarendon, Port Kaiser in St. Elizabeth, Port Rhoades in Discovery Bay, Reynolds Pier in Ocho Rios, and Boundbrook Port in Port Antonio.

To aid the navigation of shipping, Jamaica operates nine lighthouses. They are maintained by the Port Authority of Jamaica, an agency of the Ministry of Transport and Works.

=== Energy ===
Jamaica's electricity production by source, 1980 to 2018

Jamaica renewable electricity production by source, 1980 to 2018

Jamaica depends on petroleum imports to satisfy its national energy needs. Many test sites have been explored for oil, but no commercially viable quantities have been found. The most convenient sources of imported oil and motor fuels (diesel, gasoline, and jet fuel) are from Mexico and Venezuela.

Jamaica's electrical power is produced by diesel bunker oil generators located in Old Harbour. This facility has been further equipped with liquid natural gas capability and storage. Other smaller power stations, most owned by the Jamaica Public Service Company, the island's electricity provider, support the island's electrical grid including the Hunts Bay Power Station, the Bogue Power Station Saint James, the Rockfort Power Station Saint Andrew and small hydroelectric plants on the White River, Rio Bueno, Morant River, Black River (Maggotty) and Roaring River. A wind farm, owned by the Petroleum Corporation of Jamaica, was established at Wigton, Manchester.

Jamaica has successfully operated a SLOWPOKE-2 nuclear reactor of 20 kW capacity since the early 1980s. In 2024, the Government committed to adding small modular reactors (SMR) to the country's energy mix, signing a memorandum of understanding (MOU) with Atomic Energy of Canada Limited (AECL) and Canadian Nuclear Laboratories to promote the adoption of nuclear power in Jamaica.

In 2007, Jamaica imported approximately 80,000 barrels (13,000 m^{3}) of oil energy products per day, including asphalt and lubrication products. Just 20% of imported fuels are used for road transportation, the rest being used by the bauxite industry, electricity generation, and aviation. 30,000 barrels/day of crude imports are processed into various motor fuels and asphalt by the Petrojam Refinery in Kingston.

Jamaica produces enormous quantities of drinking alcohol (at least 5% water content), most of which appears to be consumed as beverages, and none used as motor fuel. Facilities exist to refine hydrous ethanol feedstock into anhydrous ethanol (0% water content), but as of 2007, the process appeared to be uneconomic and the production plant was idle. The facility has since been purchased by West Indies Petroleum Ltd. and repurposed for petroleum distillates.

=== Communication ===
Jamaica has a fully digital telephone communication system with a mobile penetration of over 95%.

The country's two mobile operators – FLOW Jamaica (formerly LIME, bMobile and Cable and Wireless Jamaica) and Digicel Jamaica have spent millions in network upgrades and expansion. The newest operator, Digicel was granted a licence in 2001 to operate mobile services in the newly liberalised telecom market that had once been the sole domain of the incumbent FLOW (then Cable and Wireless Jamaica) monopoly. Digicel opted for the more widely used GSM wireless system, while a past operator, Oceanic (which became Claro Jamaica and later merged with Digicel Jamaica in 2011) opted for the CDMA standard.

FLOW (formerly "LIME" – pre-Columbus Communications merger) which had begun with TDMA standard, subsequently upgraded to GSM in 2002, decommissioned TDMA in 2006 and only utilised that standard until 2009 when LIME launched its 3G network. Both operators currently provide islandwide coverage with HSPA+ (3G) technology. Currently, only Digicel offers LTE to its customers whereas FLOW Jamaica has committed to launching LTE in the cities of Kingston and Montego Bay, places where Digicel's LTE network is currently only found in, in short order.

A new entrant to the Jamaican communications market, Flow Jamaica, laid a new submarine cable connecting Jamaica to the United States. This new cable increases the total number of submarine cables connecting Jamaica to the rest of the world to four. Cable and Wireless Communications (parent company of LIME) acquired the company in late 2014 and replaced their brand LIME with FLOW. FLOW Jamaica currently has the most broadband and cable subscribers on the island and also has 1 million mobile subscribers, second to Digicel (which had, at its peak, over 2 million mobile subscriptions on its network).

Digicel entered the broadband market in 2010 by offering WiMAX broadband, capable of up to 6 Mbit/s per subscriber. To further their broadband share post-LIME/FLOW merger in 2014, the company introduced a new broadband service called Digicel Play, which is Jamaica's second FTTH offering (after LIME's deployment in selected communities in 2011). It is currently only available in the parishes of Kingston, Portmore and St. Andrew. It offers speeds of up to 200 Mbit/s down, 100 Mbit/s up via a pure fibre optic network. Digicel's competitor, FLOW Jamaica, has a network consisting of ADSL, Coaxial and Fibre to the Home (inherited from LIME) and only offers speeds up to 100 Mbit/s. FLOW has committed to expanding its Fibre offering to more areas in order to combat Digicel's entrance into the market.

It was announced that the Office and Utilities Regulations (OUR), Ministry of Science, Technology, Energy and Mining (MSTEM) and the Spectrum Management Authority (SMA) have given approval for another mobile operator licence in January 2016. The identity of this entrant was ascertained on 20 May 2016, when the Jamaican Government named the new carrier as Symbiote Investments Limited operating under the name Caricel. The company will focus on 4G LTE data offerings and will first go live in the Kingston Metropolitan Area and will expand to the rest of Jamaica thereafter.

== Demographics ==
=== Major cities ===
Largest cities or towns in Jamaica Demographic Statistics 2016, pp. 15–16 (2011 Census)
Rank	Name	Parish	Pop.
1	Kingston	Kingston	661,862
2	Portmore	Saint Catherine	182,153
3	Spanish Town	Saint Catherine	147,152
4	Montego Bay	Saint James	110,115
5	May Pen	Clarendon	61,548
6	Mandeville	Manchester	49,695
7	Old Harbour	Saint Catherine	28,912
8	Savanna-la-Mar	Westmoreland	22,633
9	Ocho Rios	Saint Ann	16,671
10	Linstead	Saint Catherine	15,231

=== Ethnic origins ===
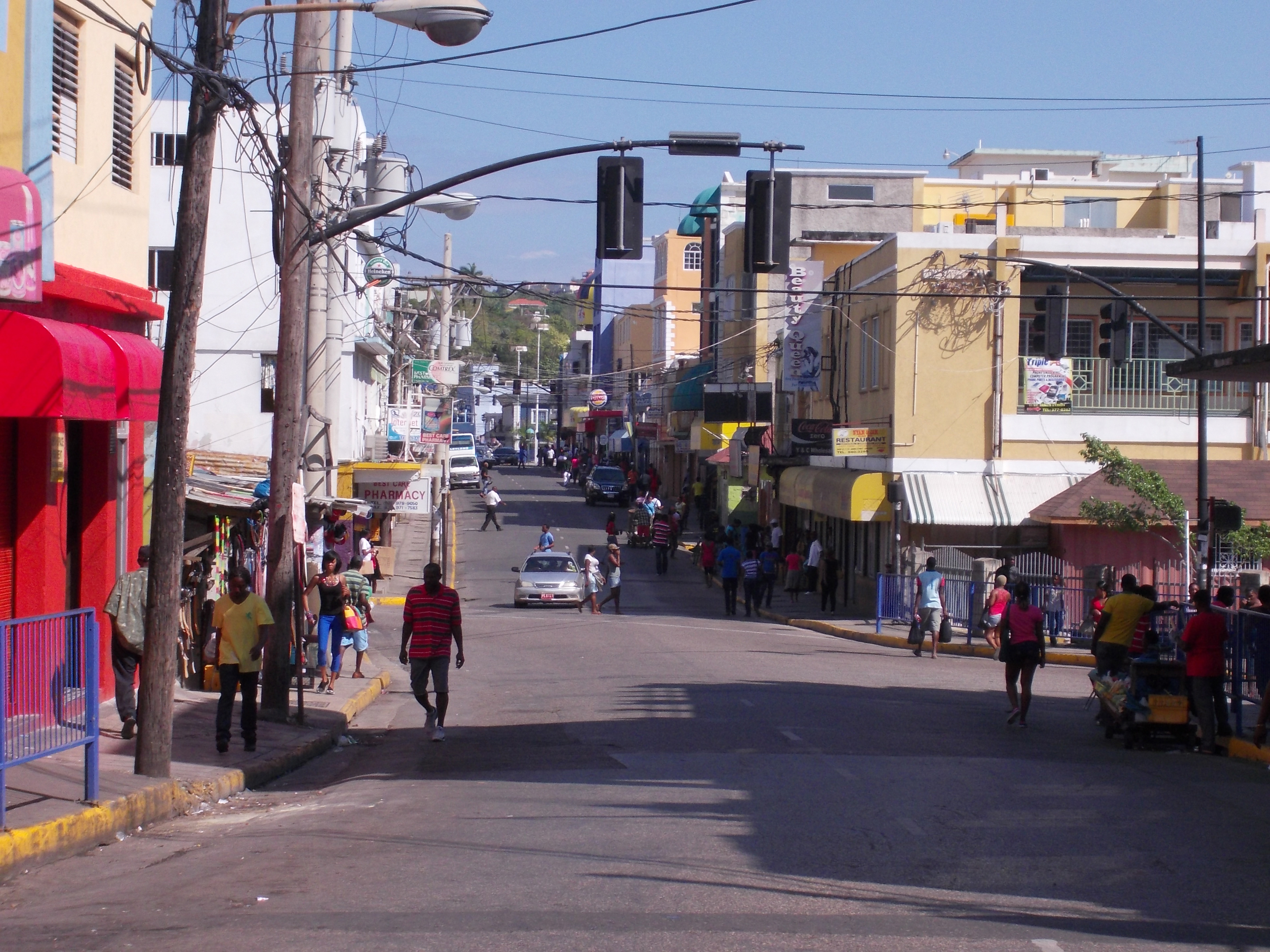
Montego Bay, Jamaica's second-largest city

Breakdown of responses to the 2011 census by the University of the West Indies.

Ethnic origin	Percentage	Approx. Population
African descent	76.3	2,047,668
Afro-European	15.1	405,240
East Indian and Afro-East Indian	3.4	91,246
White	3.2	85,878
Chinese	1.2	32,224
Other	0.8	21,470
Total	100.0%	2,683,707

Jamaica's diverse ethnic roots are reflected in the national motto "Out of Many One People". Some dispute the appropriateness of the motto because Jamaicans are overwhelmingly of a single race. The Jamaican founding fathers were mostly White or brown men and unrepresentative of the views of the country's majority Black population.

In 2018, of the population of 2,812,000, most were of African or partially African descent, with many being able to trace their origins to the West African countries of present-day Ghana and Nigeria. Other major ancestral areas are Europe, South Asia, and East Asia. It is uncommon for Jamaicans to identify themselves by race as is prominent in other countries such as the United States, with most Jamaicans seeing Jamaican nationality as an identity in and of itself, identifying as simply being "Jamaican" regardless of ethnicity. A study found that the average admixture on the island was 78.3% Sub-Saharan African, 16.0% European, and 5.7% East Asian.

A more precise study was conducted by the local University of the West Indies – Jamaica's population is more accurately 76.3% African descent or Black, 15.1% Afro-European (or locally called the Brown Man or Browning Class), 3.4% East Indian and Afro-East Indian, 3.2% White, 1.2% Chinese and 0.8% Other. The Jamaican Maroons of Accompong and other settlements are the descendants of African slaves who fled the plantations for the interior, where they set up their own autonomous communities. Many Maroons continue to have their own traditions and speak their own language, known locally as Kromanti.

Asians form the third-largest group (after the Browning Class – i.e. descendants of the mulattos during slavery and other interracial mixtures subsequent to emancipation) and include Indo-Jamaicans and Chinese Jamaicans. Most are descended from indentured workers brought by the British colonial government to fill labour shortages following the abolition of slavery in 1838. Along with their Indian counterparts, Chinese Jamaicans have also played an integral part in Jamaica's community and history. There are about 20,000 Jamaicans who have Lebanese and Syrian ancestry. Most were Christian immigrants who fled the Ottoman occupation of Lebanon in the early 19th century. Eventually, their descendants became very successful politicians and businessmen.

The first wave of English immigrants arrived on the island in 1655 after conquering the Spanish, and they have historically been the dominant group. The first Irish immigrants came to Jamaica in the 1600s as war prisoners and, later, as indentured labourers. In the 1650s, Oliver Cromwell exiled Scots prisoners of war to Jamaica, and as a result, Scots and Scottish Jamaicans have made a significant impact on the island, including many Jamaicans having common Scottish surnames, place names across the island of Scottish origins, the establishments of Presbyterian churches by Scots across the island in the 17th century, as well as the national flag of Jamaica taking inspiration from the national flag of Scotland.

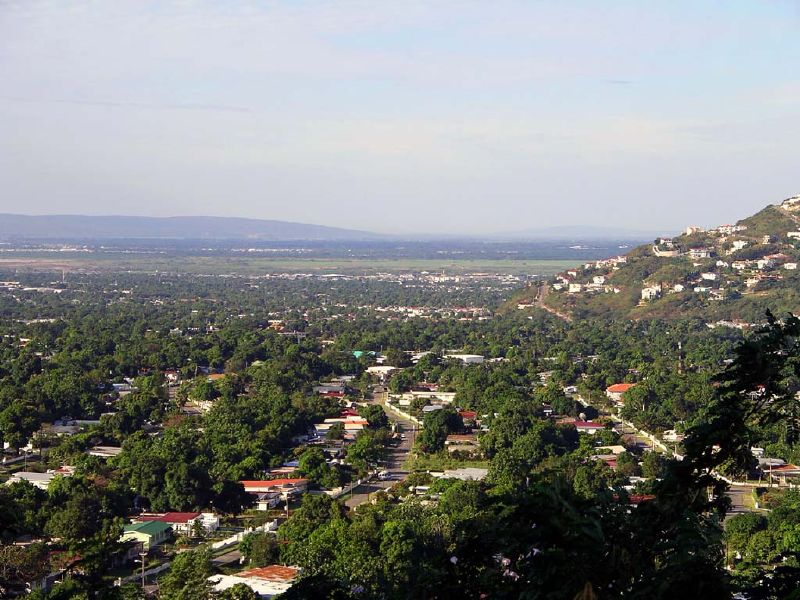
Northern suburbs of Kingston, Jamaica's capital and largest city

There is also a significant Jamaican population of Portuguese descent that is predominantly of Sephardic Jewish heritage. The first Jews arrived as explorers from Spain in the 15th century after being forced to choose between expulsion or conversion to Christianity. A small number of them became slave owners or pirates. Judaism eventually became very influential in Jamaica and can be seen today with many Jewish cemeteries around the country. During the Holocaust, Jamaica became a refuge for Jews fleeing persecution in Europe.

=== Emigration ===
Many Jamaicans have emigrated to other countries, especially the United Kingdom, the United States, and Canada. In the case of the United States, about 20,000 Jamaicans per year are granted permanent residence. There has also been emigration of Jamaicans to other Caribbeans countries such as Cuba, Puerto Rico, Guyana, and The Bahamas. In 2004, it was estimated that up to 2.5 million Jamaicans and Jamaican descendants lived abroad.

In 2007, about 800,000 Jamaicans lived in the United Kingdom, making them by far the UK's largest African-Caribbean group. Large-scale migration from Jamaica to the UK occurred primarily in the 1950s and 1960s when Jamaica was still under British rule. There are Jamaican communities in most large UK cities. Concentrations of expatriate Jamaicans are quite considerable in numerous cities in the United States, including New York City, Buffalo, the Miami metro area, Atlanta, Chicago, Orlando, Tampa, Washington, D.C., Philadelphia, Hartford, Providence and Los Angeles.

In Canada, the Jamaican population is centred in Toronto, with smaller communities in cities such as Hamilton, Montreal, Winnipeg, Vancouver and Ottawa. In 2006, Jamaican Canadians comprised about 30% of the Black Canadian population. A notable though much smaller group of emigrants are Jamaicans in Ethiopia. These are mostly Rastafarians, in whose theological worldview Africa is the promised land, or "Zion", or more specifically Ethiopia, due to reverence in which former Ethiopian Emperor Haile Selassie is held. Most live in the small town of Shashamane about 150 miles (240 km) south of the capital Addis Ababa.

=== Crime ===
When Jamaica gained independence in 1962, the murder rate was 3.9 per 100,000 inhabitants, one of the lowest in the world. By 2009, the rate was 62 per 100,000 inhabitants, one of the highest in the world. Gang violence became a serious problem, with organised crime being centred around Jamaican posses or "Yardies". Jamaica has had one of the highest murder rates in the world for many years, according to UN estimates. Some areas of Jamaica, particularly poor areas in Kingston, Montego Bay and elsewhere experience high levels of crime and violence.

However, there were 1,683 reported murders in 2009 and 1,447 in 2010. After 2011 the murder rate continued to fall, following the downward trend in 2010, after a strategic programme was launched. In 2012, the Ministry of National Security reported a 30 percent decrease in murders. Nevertheless, in 2017, murders rose by 22% over the previous year.

Many Jamaicans are hostile towards LGBT and intersex people, and mob attacks against gay people have been reported. Numerous high-profile dancehall and ragga artists have produced songs featuring explicitly homophobic lyrics. This has prompted the formations of LGBT rights organisations, such as Stop Murder Music. Homosexuality is illegal and punishable by imprisonment.

=== Languages ===
Jamaica is regarded as a bilingual country, with two major languages used by the population. The official language is (Jamaican) English, which is "used in all domains of public life", including the government, the legal system, the media, and education. The primary spoken language is an English-based creole language called Jamaican Patois (or Patwa). The two exist in a dialect continuum, with speakers using a different speech register depending on the context and to whom they speak. "Pure" Patois, though sometimes perceived as merely a particularly aberrant dialect of English, is essentially mutually unintelligible with standard English and linguists consider it a distinct language, though most of its vocabulary originally derives from English.

A 2007 survey by the Jamaican Language Unit found that 17.1 percent of the population were monolingual in Jamaican Standard English (JSE), 36.5 percent were monolingual in Patois, and 46.4 percent were bilingual, although earlier surveys had pointed to a greater degree of bilingualism, up to 90 percent. The Jamaican education system had only in about 2015 begun to offer formal instruction in Patois while retaining JSE as the "official language of instruction".

Some Jamaicans use one or more of Jamaican Sign Language (JSL), American Sign Language (ASL) or the declining indigenous Jamaican Country Sign Language (Konchri Sain). Both JSL and ASL are rapidly replacing Konchri Sain for a variety of reasons.

=== Religion ===
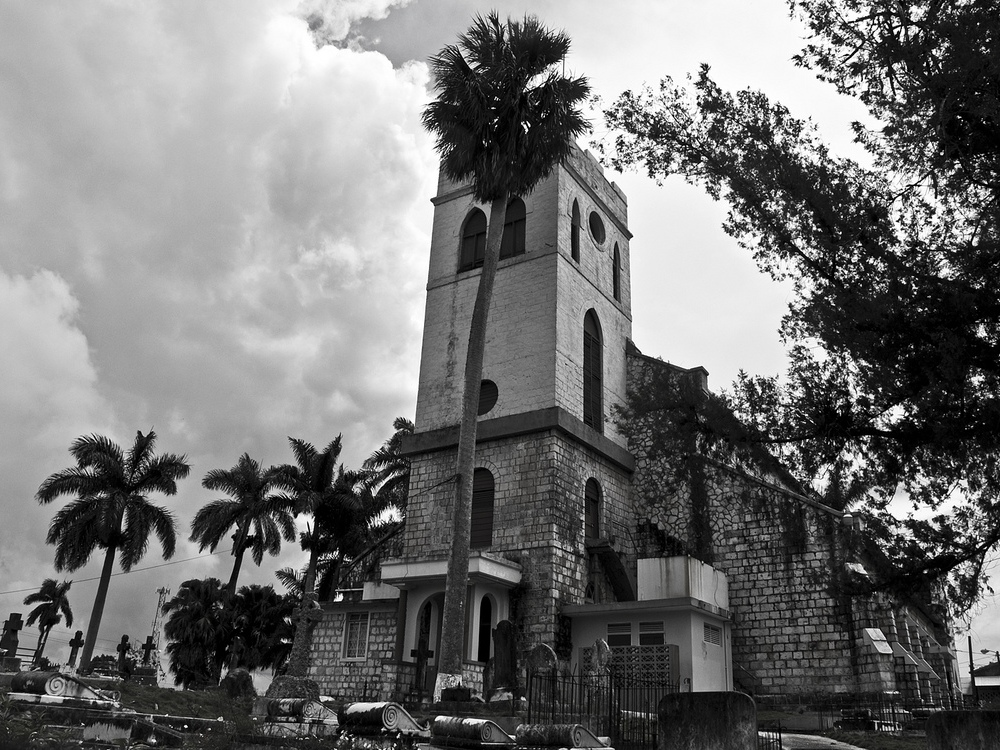
Mandeville Church (est. 1816), an Anglican church in Manchester Parish. Christianity is the largest religion in Jamaica.

Christianity is the largest religion practised in Jamaica. About 70% are Protestants; Catholics are just 2% of the population. In the 2001 census, Jamaica's largest Protestant denominations were the Church of God (24%), Seventh-day Adventist Church (11%), Pentecostal (10%), Baptist (7%), Anglican (4%), United Church (2%), Methodist (2%), Moravian (1%) and Plymouth Brethren (1%). Bedwardism is a form of Christianity native to the island, sometimes viewed as a separate faith. The Christian faith gained acceptance as British Christian abolitionists and Baptist missionaries joined educated former slaves in the struggle against slavery.

In 2011, the Rastafari movement had 29,026 adherents, with 25,325 Rastafarian males and 3,701 Rastafarian females. The faith originated in Jamaica in the 1930s and though rooted in Christianity it is heavily Afrocentric in its focus, revering figures such as the Jamaican black nationalist Marcus Garvey and Haile Selassie, the former Emperor of Ethiopia. Rastafari has since spread across the globe, especially to areas with large black or African diasporas.

Faiths and traditional religious practices derived from Africa are practised on the island, notably Kumina, Convince, Myal and Obeah.

Other religions in Jamaica include Jehovah's Witnesses (2% population), the Bahá'í faith, which counts perhaps 8,000 adherents and 21 Local Spiritual Assemblies, Mormonism, Buddhism, and Hinduism. The Hindu Diwali festival is celebrated yearly among the Indo-Jamaican community.

There is also a small population of about 200 Jews, who describe themselves as Liberal-Conservative. The first Jews in Jamaica trace their roots back to early 15th-century Spain and Portugal. Kahal Kadosh Shaare Shalom, also known as the United Congregation of Israelites, is a historic synagogue located in the city of Kingston. Originally built in 1912, it is the official and only Jewish place of worship left on the island. The once abundant Jewish population has voluntarily converted to Christianity over time. Shaare Shalom is one of the few synagogues in the world that contains sand covered floors and is a popular tourist destination.

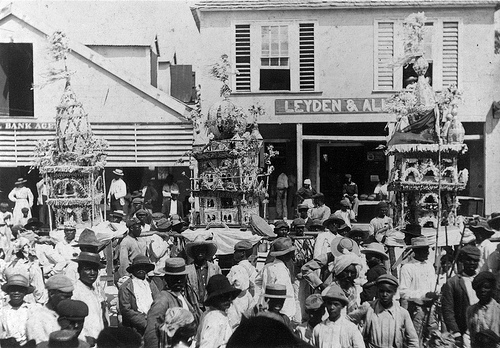
A historic Ashura celebration in Jamaica, which is known locally as Hussay or Hosay

In 2007, there were 5,000 Muslims in Jamaica. The Muslim holidays of Ashura, known locally as Hussay or Hosay, and Eid have been celebrated throughout the island for hundreds of years. In the past, every plantation in each parish celebrated Hosay. Today it has been called an Indian carnival and is perhaps most well known in Clarendon where it is celebrated each August. People of all religions attend the event, showing mutual respect.

=== Education ===
The emancipation of the slaves heralded the establishment of an education system for the masses. Prior to emancipation there were few schools for educating locals and many sent their children off to England to access quality education. After emancipation the West Indian Commission granted a sum of money to establish Elementary Schools, now known as All Age Schools. Most of these schools were established by the churches. This was the genesis of the modern Jamaican school system.

Presently the following categories of schools exist:

- Early childhood – Basic, infant and privately operated pre-school. Age cohort: 2 – 5 years.
- Primary – Publicly and privately owned (privately owned being called preparatory schools). Ages 3 – 12 years.
- Secondary – Publicly and privately owned. Ages 10 – 19 years. The high schools in Jamaica may be either single-sex or co-educational institutions, and many schools follow the traditional English grammar school model used throughout the British West Indies.
- Tertiary – Community colleges; teachers' colleges, with the Mico Teachers' College (now The MICO University College) being the oldest, founded in 1836; the Shortwood Teachers' College (which was once an all-female teacher training institution); vocational training centres, colleges and universities, publicly and privately owned. There are five local universities: the University of the West Indies (Mona Campus); the University of Technology, Jamaica, formerly The College of Art Science and Technology (CAST); the Northern Caribbean University, formerly West Indies College; the University of the Commonwealth Caribbean, formerly the University College of The Caribbean; and the International University of the Caribbean.

There are many community and teacher training colleges.

Education is free from the early childhood to secondary levels. There are also opportunities for those who cannot afford further education in the vocational arena, through the Human Employment and Resource Training-National Training Agency (HEART Trust-NTA) programme, which is opened to all working age national population and through an extensive scholarship network for the various universities.

== Culture ==
=== Music ===
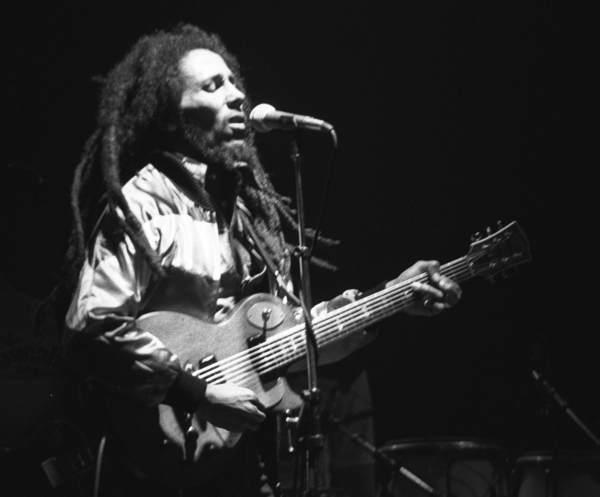
Bob Marley, one of the most famous reggae artists from Jamaica

Jamaican culture has a strong global presence. The musical genres reggae, ska, mento, rocksteady, dub, and, more recently, dancehall and ragga all originated in the island's vibrant, popular urban recording industry. These have themselves gone on to influence numerous other genres, such as punk rock (through reggae and ska), dub poetry, New Wave, two-tone, lovers rock, reggaeton, jungle, drum and bass, dubstep, grime and American rap music. Some rappers, such as The Notorious B.I.G., Busta Rhymes, and Heavy D, are of Jamaican descent.

Bob Marley is probably the best known Jamaican musician; with his band the Wailers he had a string of hits in 1960s–70s, popularising reggae internationally and going on to sell millions of records.

=== Literature ===
The journalist and author H. G. de Lisser used his native country as the setting for his many novels. Born in Falmouth, Jamaica, de Lisser worked as a reporter for the Jamaica Times at a young age and in 1920 began publishing the magazine Planters' Punch. The White Witch of Rosehall is one of his better-known novels. He was named Honorary President of the Jamaican Press Association; he worked throughout his professional career to promote the Jamaican sugar industry. Roger Mais, a journalist, poet, and playwright wrote many short stories, plays, and novels, including The Hills Were Joyful Together (1953), Brother Man (1954), and Black Lightning (1955).

Ian Fleming, who had a home in Jamaica where he spent considerable time, repeatedly used the island as a setting in his James Bond novels, including Live and Let Die, Doctor No, "For Your Eyes Only", The Man with the Golden Gun, and Octopussy and The Living Daylights. Marlon James (1970), novelist has published three novels: John Crow's Devil (2005), The Book of Night Women (2009) and A Brief History of Seven Killings (2014), winner of the 2015 Man Booker Prize.

=== Film ===
Jamaica has a history in the film industry dating from the early 1960s. A look at delinquent youth in Jamaica is presented in the 1970s musical crime film The Harder They Come, starring Jimmy Cliff as a frustrated (and psychopathic) reggae musician who descends into a murderous crime spree. Other notable Jamaican films include Countryman, Rockers, Dancehall Queen, One Love, Shottas, Out the Gate, Third World Cop and Kingston Paradise. Jamaica is also often used as a filming location, such as the James Bond film Dr. No (1962), Papillon (1973) starring Steve McQueen, Cocktail (1988) starring Tom Cruise, and the 1993 Disney comedy Cool Runnings, which is loosely based on the true story of Jamaica's first bobsled team trying to make it in the Winter Olympics.

=== Cuisine ===
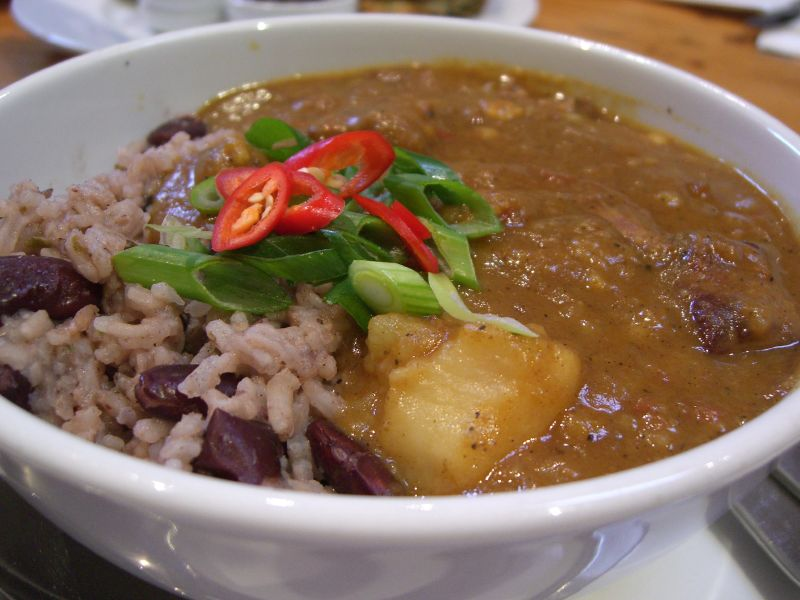
Jamaican curry goat with rice and peas

The island is famous for its Jamaican jerk spice, curries and rice and peas which is integral to Jamaican cuisine. Jamaica is also home to Red Stripe beer and Jamaican Blue Mountain Coffee.

=== Sport ===
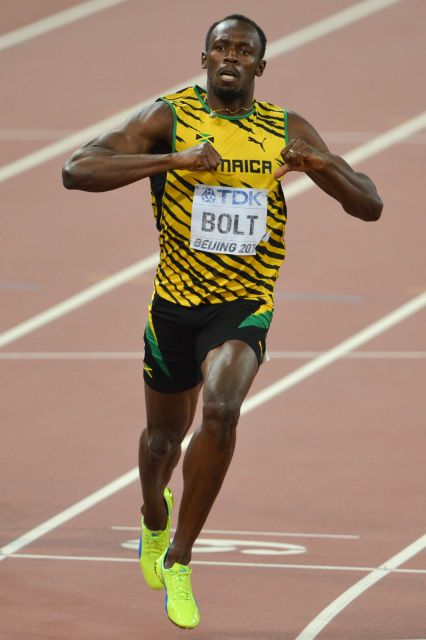
Usain Bolt is widely considered the greatest sprinter of all time.

While the most popular local sport is cricket, on the international stage Jamaicans have tended to do particularly well at track and field athletics. A July 2024 analysis by The Economist ranked Jamaica number one in the world for Olympic medals won relative to GDP since 2000, highlighting the country's outsized impact in global athletics.

The country was one of the venues of 2007 Cricket World Cup and the West Indies cricket team is one of 12 ICC full member teams that participate in international Test cricket. The Jamaica national cricket team competes regionally, and also provides players for the West Indies team. Sabina Park is the only Test venue in the island, but the Greenfield Stadium is also used for cricket.

Since independence, Jamaica has consistently produced world-class athletes in track and field. Over the past six decades Jamaica has produced dozens of world-class sprinters.

Association football and horse-racing are other popular sports in Jamaica. The national football team qualified for the 1998 FIFA World Cup. Horse racing was Jamaica's first sport.

Race car driving is also a popular sport in Jamaica with several car racing tracks and racing associations across the country. Jamaican drivers have achieved growing international success. Other notable competitors include Thomas Gore, a podium finisher in ADAC GT4 Germany and part of the 2024 Team Championship‑winning squad;

The Jamaica national bobsled team was once a serious contender in the Winter Olympics, beating many well-established teams. Chess and basketball are widely played in Jamaica and are supported by the Jamaica Chess Federation (JCF) and the Jamaica Basketball Federation (JBF), respectively. Netball is also very popular on the island, with the Jamaica national netball team called The Sunshine Girls consistently ranking in the top five in the world.

Rugby league has been played in Jamaica since 2006. The Jamaica national rugby league team is made up of players who play in Jamaica and from UK based professional and semi professional clubs (notably in the Super League and Championship). In November 2018 for the first time ever, the Jamaican rugby league team qualified for the Rugby League World Cup after defeating the USA and Canada. Jamaica will play in the 2021 Rugby League World Cup in England.

== See also ==
- List of Jamaicans
- Outline of Jamaica
