= Black nationalism =

Ideology that seeks to develop a Black national identity

Black nationalism is a type of racial nationalism which seeks representation for Black people as a distinct national identity, especially in racialized, colonial and postcolonial societies. Its earliest proponents saw it as a way to advocate for democratic representation in culturally plural societies or to establish self-governing independent nation-states for Black people. Modern Black nationalism often aims for the social, political, and economic empowerment of Black communities within white majority societies, either as an alternative to assimilation or as a way to ensure greater representation and equality within predominantly Eurocentric cultures.

As an ideology, Black nationalism encompasses a diverse range of beliefs which have variously included forms of economic, political and cultural nationalism, or pan-nationalism. It often overlaps with, but is distinguished from, similar concepts and movements such as Pan-Africanism, Ethiopianism, the back-to-Africa movement (also known as Black Zionism), Afrocentrism, and Garveyism. Critics of Black nationalism compare it to white nationalism and white supremacy, and say it often invokes separatism and Black supremacy.

== Concepts ==
Black nationalism reflects the idea that, in racialized societies, people of diverse African descent are often treated as a single racial, ethnic and cultural group (such as African Americans in the US or Black Britons in the UK). Because of a shared history of oppression and a distinct culture shaped by that history, Black nationalism argues that Black people in the African diaspora therefore form a distinct nation (or multiple distinct nations) and so have a right to representation or self-governance. Black nationalists therefore seek to acquire political and economic power to improve the quality of life and freedoms of Black people collectively.

Black nationalists tend to believe in self-reliance and self-sufficiency for Black people, solidarity among Black people as a nation, and pride in Black achievement and culture, in order to overcome the effects of institutionalized inequality, self-hate and internalized racism.

The roots of Black nationalism extend back to the time of the transatlantic trade in enslaved Africans, when some enslaved Africans revolted or formed independent Black settlements (such as the Maroons), free of European control. By the 19th century, African Americans such as Paul Cuffe and Martin Delany called for free and fugitive Black people to emigrate to Africa to help establish independent nations. In the early 20th century, Jamaican activist Marcus Garvey moved to the US and, inspired by Zionism and Irish independence, promoted Black nationalist and Pan-African ideas, which collectively became known as Garveyism.

Modern Black nationalist ideas coalesced as a distinct movement during the era of racial segregation in America, as a response to centuries of institutionalized white supremacy, the discrimination African Americans experienced as a result, and the perceived failures of the nonviolent civil rights movement of the time. After the assassination of Malcolm X in 1965, the Black nationalism movement gained increased traction in various African American communities. A focus on returning to Africa became less popular, giving way to the idea that Black people constituted a "nation within a nation," and therefore should seek better rights and political power within a multicultural US.

Black nationalists often fought racism, colonialism, imperialism & capitalism The ideology has influenced the Organization of Afro-American Unity, the Black Panther Party, Black Islam, and the Black Power movement.

=== Black nationalism, Black separatism and Black supremacy ===
There are similarities between Black separatism and Black nationalism, since they both advocate for the civil rights of Black people. While Black separatists believe that Black people should be physically separated from other races, primarily whites, Black nationalism focuses primarily on civil rights, self-determination, and democratic representation.

These two ideologies can also overlap as "separatist nationalism", which typically manifests in the belief in a literal or metaphorical secession from white American society, and is especially popular among those who have become disillusioned with "deferred American racial equality". Separatist nationalism often rejects integration into white society—which may extend into rejection of existing political systems—preferring to organise alternative structures. In this schema, Black nationalism without Black separatism is called "cultural nationalism". Black cultural nationalism often focuses on engagement with societal and political structures to enact change, such as by attempting to elect Black representatives at the local and national level. Black cultural nationalism has broader support among African-Americans than separatist nationalism; the latter is more popular among young men and people of lower economic status. Examples of Black separatist organizations include the Nation of Islam and the New Black Panther Party.

Black nationalists often reject conflation with Black supremacy, as well as comparisons with white supremacists, characterizing their movement as an anti-racist reaction to white supremacy and color-blind white liberalism as racist. Additionally, while white nationalism often seeks to maintain or re-establish systems of white majority dominance, Black nationalism instead aims to challenge white supremacy through increased civil rights and representation (or independence) for black people as an oppressed minority. According to the Southern Poverty Law Center, Black nationalist groups have "little or no impact on mainstream politics and no defenders in high office", unlike white supremacists.

=== Revolutionary Black nationalism ===
Black nationalism may also be divided into revolutionary or reactionary Black nationalism. Revolutionary Black nationalism combines cultural nationalism with scientific socialism in order to achieve Black self-determination. Proponents of revolutionary Black nationalism say it rejects all forms of oppression, including class-based exploitation under capitalism. Revolutionary Black nationalist organizations such as the Black Panther Party and the Revolutionary Action Movement also adopted a set of anti-colonialist politics inspired by the writings of notable revolutionary theorists including Frantz Fanon, Mao Zedong, and Kwame Nkrumah. In the words of Ahmad Muhammad (formerly known as Max Stanford) the national field chairman of the Revolutionary Action Movement:

We are revolutionary black nationalist[s], not based on ideas of national superiority, but striving for justice and liberation of all the oppressed peoples of the world. ... There can be no liberty as long as black people are oppressed and the peoples of Africa, Asia, and Latin America are oppressed by Yankee imperialism and neo-colonialism. After four hundred years of oppression, we realize that slavery, racism and imperialism are all interrelated and that liberty and justice for all cannot exist peacefully with imperialism."

Professor and author Harold Cruse said revolutionary Black nationalism was a necessary and logical progression from other leftist ideologies, as non-Black leftists could not properly assess the particular material conditions of the Black community and other colonized people:

Revolutionary nationalism has not waited for Western Marxian thought to catch up with the realities of the "underdeveloped" world...The liberation of the colonies before the socialist revolution in the West is not orthodox Marxism (although it might be called Maoism or Castroism). As long as American Marxists cannot deal with the implications of revolutionary nationalism, both abroad and at home, they will continue to play the role of revolutionaries by proxy.

== History ==
=== Overview ===
Historian Wilson Jeremiah Moses suggests the development of Black nationalism can be examined over three different periods, giving rise to the various ideological perspectives within today's Black nationalism. The first period of pre-classical Black nationalism began when the first Africans were brought to the Americas as slaves through the American Revolutionary period. Many of these slaves rebelled against their captors or formed independent Black societies, beyond the reach of Europeans. The second period of Black nationalism began after the Revolutionary War, when educated Africans within the colonies became disgusted with the social conditions of Black people, and sought to create organizations that would unite Black people and improve their situation. The third period of Black nationalism arose during the post-Reconstruction era, as community leaders began to articulate the need to separate Blacks from non-Blacks for safety and to collectivize resources. The new ideology of this third period informed the philosophy of groups like the Moorish Science Temple and the Nation of Islam.

=== First period ===
In the New World, as early as 1512, African slaves escaped from Spanish captors and either joined indigenous peoples or eked out a living on their own. The first recorded slave rebellion in the region occurred in what is today the Dominican Republic, on the sugar plantations owned by Admiral Diego Columbus, on 26 December 1522. Especially in the Caribbean, escaped slaves began to form independent Black communities either in exile or with Indigenous American groups, becoming known as maroons. Maroons armed themselves to survive attacks by hostile colonists while also obtaining food for subsistence living and setting up their own communities. Other enslaved Africans were freed or bought their freedom, and began to seek their own independence, away from white society. This often included calls to emigrate to Africa and help build independent Black nations there.

==== Maroon communities ====
On some of the larger Caribbean islands, maroon communities were able to grow crops and hunt for food. As more slaves escaped from plantations, their numbers could grow. Seeking to separate themselves from colonisers, the maroons gained in power amid increasing hostility. They raided and pillaged plantations until the planters began to fear a massive slave revolt.

As early as 1655, escaped Africans had formed communities in inland Jamaica, and by the 18th century, Nanny Town and other Jamaican maroon villages began to fight for independent recognition. Jamaican Maroons consistently fought British colonists, leading to the First Maroon War (1728–1740). By 1740, the British governor of the Colony of Jamaica, Edward Trelawny had signed two treaties promising them 2,500 acres (1,012 ha) in Cudjoe's Town (Trelawny Town) and Crawford's Town, bringing an end to the warfare between the communities and effectively freeing the Maroons a century before the Slavery Abolition Act came into effect in 1838.

In Cuba, maroon communities formed in the mountains when escaped African slaves joined the indigenous Taínos. Before roads were built into the mountains of Puerto Rico, heavy brush kept many escaped maroons hidden in the southwestern hills where many also intermarried with the natives. Escaped slaves sought refuge away from the coastal plantations of Ponce. In the plantation colony of Suriname, escaped slaves revolted and started to build their own villages. On October 10, 1760, the Ndyuka signed a treaty with the Dutch recognising their territorial autonomy; it was drafted by Adyáko Benti Basiton of Boston, a formerly enslaved African from Jamaica.

=== Second period ===
In the mid-to-late 18th century, Methodist and Baptist evangelists during the period of the First Great Awakening (c. 1730–1755) encouraged slave owners to free their slaves, in their belief that all men were equal before God. They converted many slaves to Christianity and approved Black leaders as preachers; Blacks developed their own churches.

After the Revolutionary War, educated Africans within the colonies (specifically within New England and Pennsylvania) had become disgusted with the social conditions of Black people. Individuals such as Prince Hall, Richard Allen, Absalom Jones, James Forten, Cyrus Bustill and William Gray sought to create organizations that would unite Black people, who had been excluded from white society, and improve their situation collectively. Institutions such as Black Masonic lodges, the Free African Society, and the African Episcopal Church of St. Thomas lay the groundwork for the independent Black organizations and communities that would follow.

Meanwhile, Black people were relocated from the Americas and Britain to new colonies in Sierra Leone and Liberia, paving the way for Black-led nations in those countries. Back in the Caribbean, the Haitian Revolution proved to disparate Black communities across the Americas that they could achieve independence or equality in the law, if they cooperated and worked together.

==== First Great Awakening ====
The First Great Awakening (c. 1730–1755) was a series of Christian revivals that swept Britain and its thirteen North American colonies. The revival movement permanently affected Protestantism as adherents strove to renew individual piety and religious devotion. Northern Baptist and Methodist preachers converted both white and Black people, whether the latter were free or not.

The message of spiritual equality appealed to many enslaved people and, as African religious traditions continued to decline in North America, Black people accepted Christianity in large numbers for the first time. Black people even began to take active roles in these mixed churches, sometimes even preaching. Many leaders of the revivals also proclaimed that enslaved people should be educated so that they could read and study the Bible. This helped establish a new class of educated black people in America.

==== Revolutionary War ====
Before the American Revolutionary War of 1775–1783, few slaves were manumitted. On the eve of the American Revolution, there was an estimated 30,000 free African Americans in Colonial America which accounts for about 5% of the total African American population. The Revolutionary War greatly disrupted slave societies and showed Bl

With the 1775 proclamation of Lord Dunmore, governor of Virginia, the British began recruiting the slaves of American revolutionaries and promised them freedom in return. Free Blacks like Prince Hall proposed that Blacks be allowed to join the American side, believing if they were involved in founding the new nation, it would aid in attaining freedom for all Black people. The Continental Army gradually began to allow Blacks to fight in exchange for their freedom.

==== Nova Scotia and Sierra Leone ====
Between 1713 and 1758, the Fortress of Louisbourg on Île-Royale (now Cape Breton Island) became the first Black community in Nova Scotia. During this early period, 381 Black people, some free and others enslaved, escaped or were brought to the Fortress, mostly from the Francophone Caribbean colonies. It was home to a mix of freed and unfree enslaved Africans, who undertook a variety of trades and professions, such as gardeners, bakers, stonemasons, musicians, soldiers, sailors, fishermen, hospital workers, and more.

After the Revolutionary War, General Washington urged the British to return the Black Loyalists as stolen property, under the Treaty of Paris (1783). The British attempted to keep their promise to the Loyalists by relocating them outside the US. The British transported more than 3,000 Black Loyalists and Jamaican Maroons to resettle in Nova Scotia (part of present-day Ontario). Between 1749 and 1816, approximately 10,000 Black people settled in Nova Scotia. Those settlers who remained in Nova Scotia would go on to found large communities of freed Black people, forming 52 black settlements in total, and would develop their own national identity as Black Nova Scotians.

Meanwhile, in 1786, the Committee for the Relief of the Black Poor, a British organization with government support, launched its efforts to establish the Sierra Leone Province of Freedom, a colony in West Africa for London's "Black poor". After Nova Scotia proved a hostile environment for many of the new settlers, with extreme weather as well as racism from the white Nova Scotians, about a third of the Loyalists, and nearly all of the Jamaican Maroons, petitioned the British for passage to Sierra Leone as well, eventually leading to the founding of Freetown in 1792. Their descendants are known as the Sierra Leone Creole people.

==== Black Mutual Aid Societies and Black Churches ====
Since most sources of welfare at the time were controlled by whites, free blacks across the early United States created their own mutual aid societies. These societies offered cultural centers, spiritual assistance, and financial resources to their members. The Free African Union Society, founded in 1780 in Newport, Rhode Island, was America's first African benevolent society. Founders and early members included Prince Amy, Lincoln Elliot, Bristol Yamma, Zingo Stevens and Newport Gardner. It became the model for multiple similar organizations across the Northeast.

In 1787, Richard Allen and Absalom Jones formed the Free African Society (FAS) of Pennsylvania. It became famous for its members' work as nurses and aides during the Yellow Fever Epidemic of 1793, when many other residents abandoned the city. Notable members included African-American abolitionists such as Cyrus Bustill, James Forten, and William Gray, as well as survivors of the Haitian Revolution in Saint-Domingue, as well as fugitive slaves escaping from the South.

The FAS provided guidance, medical care, and financial advice. The last became particularly important, and would establish a model for later African American banks. It operated ten private schools for Blacks across Pennsylvania, performed burials and weddings, and recorded births and marriages. Its activity and open doors served as motivator for growth for the city, inspiring many other Black mutual aid societies to pop up.

In 1793, Jones and several other FAS members also founded the St. Thomas African Episcopal Church, a nondenominational church specifically for Black people. This in turn paved the way for the first independent Black churches in the United States. The church and its members played a key role in the abolition/anti-slavery and equal rights movement of the 1800s and it would later be involved in the civil rights movement.

Mutual aid became a foundation of social welfare in the United States until the early 20th century.

==== Liberia ====
Following the American Revolutionary War, the population of free people of color in the US had grown from 60,000 in 1790 to 300,000 by 1830. The prevailing view of white people was that free people of color could not integrate into U.S. society and slaveowners feared these free Blacks might help their slaves to escape or rebel. In addition, many White Americans believed that African Americans were inherently inferior and should be relocated.

In Boston, Black Quaker and activist Paul Cuffe advocated settling freed American slaves in Africa. He was a successful ship owner and in 1815, he attempted a settlement for freedmen on Sherbro Island. By 1811, he had transported some members of the Free African Society to Liberia. He also gained broad political support to take emigrants to Sierra Leone, and in 1816, Cuffe took 38 American Black people to Freetown. He died in 1817 before undertaking other voyages. By 1821, his Sherbro Island settlement had failed and the survivors also fled to Sierra Leone.

In 1816, modeled after Cuffe's work and the British resettlement of Black people in Sierra Leone, Robert Finley founded the American Colonization Society (ACS). The ACS and organizations like it aimed to encourage and support the migration of freeborn people of color and emancipated slaves to the continent of Africa. The African American community, who wanted to keep their homes, overwhelmingly opposed the ACS, as did the abolitionist movement. Many African Americans, both free and enslaved, were pressured into emigrating anyway.

By 1833, the Society had transported only 2,769 individuals out of the U.S. and close to half the arrivals in Liberia died from tropical diseases. During the early years, 22% of the settlers in Liberia died within one year. According to Benjamin Quarles, however, the colonization movement "originated abolitionism" by arousing the free Black people and other opponents of slavery.

Between 1822 and the outbreak of the American Civil War in 1861, more than 15,000 freed and free-born African Americans, along with 3,198 Afro-Caribbeans, relocated to Liberia. The settlers carried their culture and tradition with them, gradually developing a Black national identity as Americo-Liberians. Liberia declared independence on July 26, 1847, becoming the first African republic to proclaim its independence and Africa's first and oldest modern republic. The U.S. did not recognize Liberia's independence until February 5, 1862.

==== Haitian Revolution ====
The Haitian Revolution was a successful insurrection by self-liberated slaves against French colonial rule in Saint-Domingue (now the sovereign state of Haiti). The revolt began on 22 August 1791, and ended in 1804 with the former colony's independence from France by establishing the world's first and oldest free, Black-led republic. From the revolt, the ex-slave Toussaint Louverture emerged as Haiti's most prominent general. The revolution was the only slave uprising that led to the founding of a state which was both free from slavery (though not from forced labour) and ruled by non-whites and former captives.

The successful revolution was a defining moment in the history of the Atlantic World and the revolution's effects on the institution of slavery were felt throughout the Americas. Independence and the abolition of slavery in the former colony was followed by a successful defense of the freedoms the former slaves had won, and with the collaboration of already free people of color, of their independence from white Europeans. This had the effect of encouraging other Black communities suffering under slavery or colonialism to imagine independence and self-rule.

=== Third period ===
The third period of Black nationalism arose during the post-Reconstruction era, particularly among various African-American clergy circles. Separated circles were already established and accepted because African-Americans had long endured the oppression of slavery and Jim Crowism in the United States since its inception. The clerical phenomenon led to the birth of a modern form of Black nationalism that stressed the need to separate Blacks from non-Blacks and build separate communities that would promote racial pride and collectivize resources.

==== Scientific racism ====
In the immediate aftermath of the European Revolutions of 1848, French aristocrat Count Arthur de Gobineau wrote the pseudoscientific An Essay on the Inequality of the Human Races (Essai sur l'inégalité des Races Humaines), legitimizing scientific racism and decrying race-mixing as the doom of civilization. Gobineau's writings were quickly praised by white supremacist, pro-slavery Americans like Josiah C. Nott and Henry Hotze, who translated his book into English, but omitted around 1,000 pages, including parts that negatively described Americans as a racially mixed population. He inspired a racist social movement in Germany, named Gobinism, and his works were influential on prominent antisemites like Richard Wagner, Houston Stewart Chamberlain, A. C. Cuza, and the Nazi Party.

In 1885, Haitian anthropologist and barrister Anténor Firmin published De l'égalité des races humaines (On the Equality of Human Races) as a rebuttal to Count Arthur de Gobineau's work, challenging the idea that brain size was a measure of human intelligence and noting the presence of Black Africans in Pharaonic Egypt. Firmin then explored the significance of the Haitian Revolution of 1804 and the ensuing achievements of Haitians such as Léon Audain, Isaïe Jeanty and Edmond Paul. (Both Audain and Jeanty had obtained prizes from the Académie Nationale de Médecine.) Though marginalized for his belief in the equality of all races, his work influenced Pan-African and Black nationalist thought, and the négritude movement. Firmin influenced Jean Price-Mars, the initiator of Haitian ethnology and developer of the concept of Indigenism, and 20th-century American anthropologist Melville Herskovits.

==== Africa for Africans ====
Martin Delany (1812–1885), an African American abolitionist, was arguably the first proponent of Black nationalism as we understand it today. Delany is credited with the Pan-African slogan of "Africa for Africans." Born as a free person of color in what is now West Virginia, and raised in Pennsylvania, Delany trained as a physician's assistant. In 1850, Delany was one of the first three Black men admitted to Harvard Medical School, but all were dismissed after a few weeks because of widespread protests by white students. During the cholera epidemics of 1833 and 1854 in Pittsburgh, Delany treated patients, even though many doctors and residents fled the city out of fear of contamination.

Beginning in 1847, Delany worked alongside Frederick Douglass in Rochester, New York to publish the anti-slavery newspaper The North Star. Delany dreamed of establishing a settlement in West Africa. He visited Liberia, a United States colony founded by the American Colonization Society, and lived in Canada for several years, but when the American Civil War began, he returned to the United States. When the United States Colored Troops were created in 1863, he recruited for them. Commissioned as a major in February 1865, Delany became the first African American field grade officer in the United States Army.

After the Civil War, Delany went to the South, settling in South Carolina, where he worked for the Freedmen's Bureau and became politically active, including in the Colored Conventions Movement. Delany ran unsuccessfully for Lieutenant Governor as an Independent Republican. He was appointed as a trial judge, but he was removed following a scandal. Delany later switched his party affiliation. He worked for the campaign of Democrat Wade Hampton III, who won the 1876 election for governor in a season marked by violent suppression of Black Republican voters by Red Shirts and fraud in balloting.

After Emancipation, the back-to-Africa movement eventually began to decline. In 1877, at the end of the Reconstruction era, it would experience a revival as many Black people in the American South faced violence from groups such as the Ku Klux Klan. Interest among the South's Black population in African emigration peaked during the 1890s, a time when racism reached its peak and the greatest number of lynchings in American history took place.

==== New Imperialism and the Scramble for Africa ====
During the period known as New Imperialism (1833 to 1914), European nations colonized and occupied Africa in the "Scramble for Africa". This mobilized Black people in the diaspora to activism in their home nations. Ethiopia and Liberia were the only African countries to maintain their sovereignty and independence during this time. The African Times and Orient Review would later encourage others to emigrate to Ethiopia as part of the back-to-Africa movement. In 1919, Marcus Garvey became President of the Black Star Line, designed to forge a link between North America and Africa and facilitate African-American migration to Liberia.

During World War II, Liberia supported the United States war effort against Nazi Germany, and in turn received considerable American investment in infrastructure, which aided the country's wealth and development. President William Tubman encouraged economic and political changes that heightened the country's prosperity and international profile; Liberia was a founding member of the League of Nations, United Nations, and the Organisation of African Unity.

==== Peace Movement of Ethiopia ====
In the 1930s, the Peace Movement of Ethiopia (PME) emerged in the United States as a Black nationalist organisation that advocated for African American emigration to West Africa. The PME found an unlikely ally in Mississippi Senator Theodore G. Bilbo, a white supremacist who attempted to pass the Greater Liberia Bill, which proposed federal funding to support the voluntary emigration of Black Americans to Liberia. While Bilbo's motivations were rooted in white supremacy, PME members saw the bill as a potential path towards Black autonomy and self-determination.

Florence Kenna, a leader within the PME, praised the senator for his efforts to bring national attention to the emigration cause. Other notable Black nationalist women, including Mittie Maude Lena Gordon and Ethel Waddell, were instrumental in promoting the legislation. These women formed strategic alliances to advance the goals of Black separatism and economic independence, reflecting a broader tradition of Black women's leadership in nationalist organisations during the early 20th century, despite marginalization within both Black and mainstream political movements in the United States.

==== Marcus Garvey ====
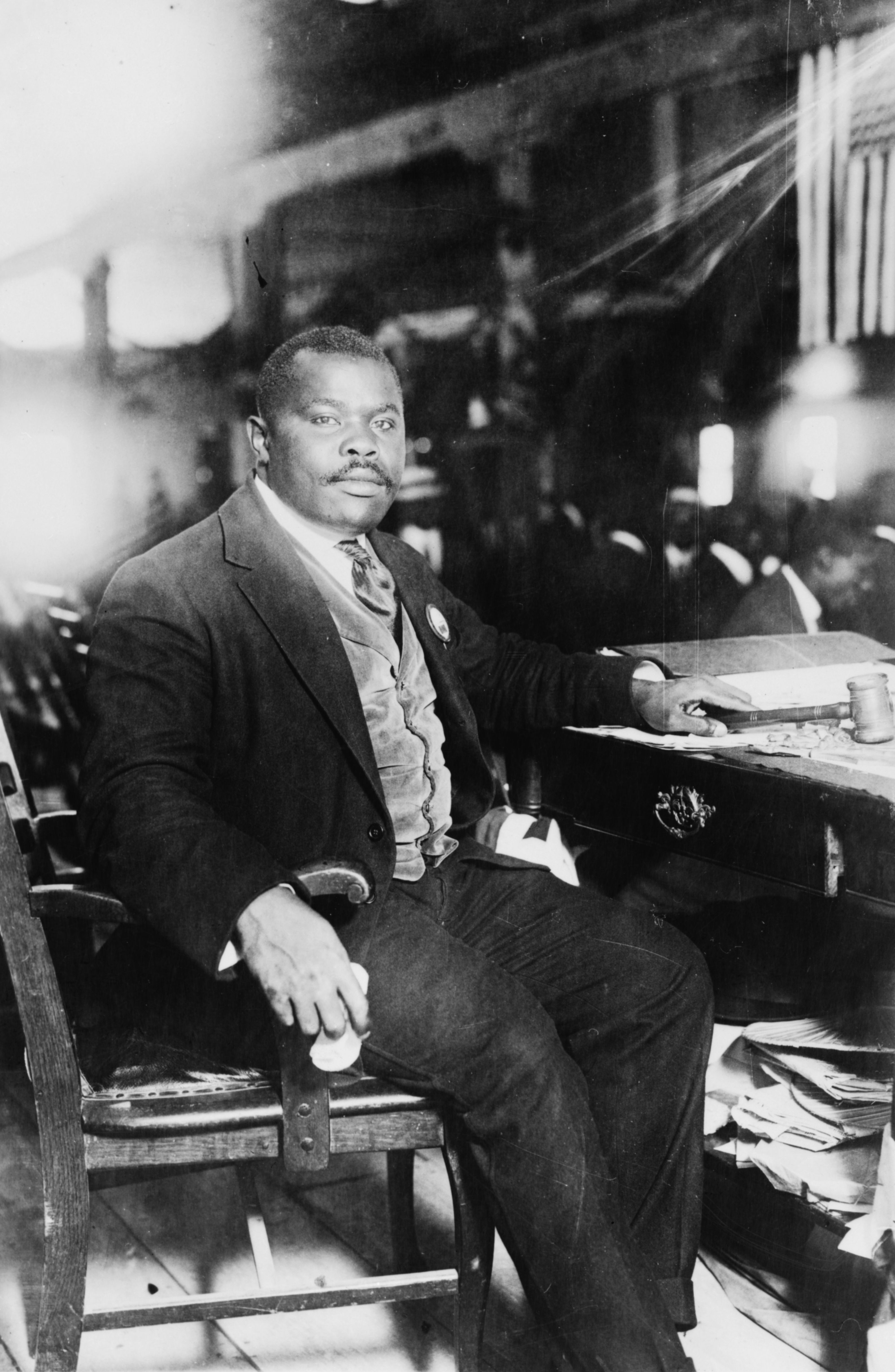
1924 photograph of Marcus Garvey

In 1914, Jamaican activist Marcus Garvey established the Universal Negro Improvement Association with his then-wife, Amy Ashwood Garvey, in Kingston. He moved to New York in 1916, and founded the first American UNIA chapter in Harlem in 1918. The UNIA is often considered one of the most powerful Black nationalist movements to date, claiming around a thousand chapters worldwide.

Marcus Garvey encouraged African people around the world to be proud of their race and see beauty in their own kind. Garvey used his own personal magnetism and understanding of Black psychology to create a movement that appealed to working class African Americans. Garvey's movement, known as Garveyism, was opposed by mainstream Black leaders, and crushed by government action. However, its many alumni remembered its inspiring rhetoric.

A central idea to Garveyism was that African people in every part of the world were one people and that, to advance, they should put aside their cultural and ethnic differences to unite under their shared history. He was heavily influenced by the earlier works of Booker T. Washington, Martin Delany, and Henry McNeal Turner. By the 1910s, Alexander Bedward became convinced that God had intended for him to be Aaron to Garvey's Moses — paving the way for the younger man to deliver his people into the Promised Land. Bedward led his followers into Garveyism by finding the charismatic metaphor: one the high priest, the other the prophet, both leading the children of Israel out of exile.

==== Frantz Fanon ====
Writer Frantz Fanon fought on the side of the Allies during WWII, and spent several years in France, where his experiences of racism led him to write his first book, Black Skin, White Masks. An analysis of the impact of colonial subjugation on the African psyche, it changed the way people thought of Blackness more generally. While in North Africa, Fanon produced The Wretched of the Earth, where he analyzes the role of class, race, national culture and violence in the struggle for decolonization. Fanon expounded upon his views on the liberating role of violence for the colonized, as well as the general necessity of violence in the anti-colonial struggle. Fanon's books established him as one of the leading anti-colonial thinkers of the 20th century, influencing Black nationalist and decolonial movements worldwide.

==== Black power ====
Ignited by the 1965 assassination of Malcolm X, and the urban riots of 1964 and 1965, the Black power movement emerged from the civil rights movement of the United States. Seen as a reaction to the mainstream civil rights movement's more moderate tendencies and motivated by a desire for safety, the movement was partially inspired by ideologies and individuals from outside the United States, such as American expatriates in newly independent Ghana, but it also impacted others outside of the United States, such as the Black Power Revolution in Trinidad and Tobago. Black power organizations such as the Black Panther Party (BPP) emerged, supporting philosophies ranging from socialism to Black nationalism. Black power activists founded black-owned bookstores, food cooperatives, farms, media, printing presses, schools, clinics and ambulance services.

In 1967, Stokely Carmichael and political scientist Charles V. Hamilton wrote Black Power: The Politics of Liberation, drawing on Black nationalist ideas to define the concept of Black power. Stokely Carmichael stated that white supremacy, colonialism, and systemic racism were drivers of disenfranchisement and racism. The authors believed Black power not only lay in dismantling white supremacy, but also in establishing camaraderie within the African American community. The authors disavowed liberal, conformist politics, instead emphasizing sovereignty for the Black community, similar to the goals of Black nationalism.

== 21st-century Black nationalism ==
Modern Black nationalism encompasses multiple different movements, organizations and philosophies. In America, Black nationalists began to "do what other 'ethnic' groups had done" — i.e., "pursue their interests in a pluralistic political system, subsumed by a capitalistic economic one". In Black Nationalism in America, John H. Bracey Jr., August Meier and Elliott Rudwick argue, "In the arena of politics, black nationalism at its mildest is bourgeois reformism, a view which assumes that the United States is politically pluralistic and that liberal values concerning democracy and the political process are operative." Dean E. Robinson, meanwhile, argues that "modern black nationalism drew upon strategies for political and economic empowerment that had analogies in the wider political landscape." According to the SPLC, Black nationalist groups face a "categorically different" environment than white nationalist groups in the United States; while white supremacy has been championed by influential figures within the Donald Trump administration, for example, Black nationalists have "little or no impact on mainstream politics and no defenders in high office".

Patrisse Cullors, a co-founder of the Black Lives Matter Global Network Foundation, has called for reparations for slavery and historic racism in the form of "financial restitution, land redistribution, political self-determination, culturally relevant education programs, language recuperation, and the right to return (or repatriation)," and cited Frantz Fanon's work for "understanding the current global context for Black individuals on the African continent and in our multiple diasporas."

The Not Fucking Around Coalition (NFAC) is a Black nationalist and Black separatist organization in the United States. The group advocates for Black liberation, and has been described by some news outlets as a "Black militia", though they have avoided violence. The NFAC gained prominence during the 2020–2021 United States racial unrest, making its first reported appearance at a protest near Brunswick, Georgia, over the February 2020 murder of Ahmaud Arbery, though they were identified by local media as "Black Panthers". Historian Thomas Mockaitis said that, "In one sense it (NFAC) echoes the Black Panthers but they are more heavily armed and more disciplined... So far, they've coordinated with police and avoided engaging with violence."

John Fitzgerald Johnson, also known as Grand Master Jay and John Jay Fitzgerald Johnson, claims leadership of the NFAC and has stated that it is composed of "ex military shooters". In 2019 Grand Master Jay told the Atlanta Black Star that the organization was formed to prevent another Greensboro Massacre. Johnson expressed early third period Black nationalist views, putting forth the view that the United States should either hand over Texas to African-Americans so they may form an independent country, or allow African-Americans to depart the United States to another country that would provide land upon which to form an independent nation.

== Black nationalism around the world ==
=== Africa ===
Black nationalism in Africa largely refers to the ideology of black nationalism brought by black communities who have migrated to Africa from the diaspora.It should not be confused with indigenous African nationalism, which is an umbrella term for a group of political ideologies in sub-Saharan Africa, based on the idea of national self-determination and the creation of African nation states.

==== Differences between black nationalism and African nationalism ====
African nationalism emerged during the mid-19th century among the emerging black middle classes in West Africa. Early nationalists hoped to overcome ethnic fragmentation by creating nation-states. In its earliest period, it was inspired by African-American and Afro-Caribbean intellectuals from the Back-to-Africa movement who imported nationalist ideals current in Europe and the Americas at the time.

The early African nationalists were elitist and believed in the supremacy of Western culture but sought a greater role for themselves in political decision-making. They rejected African traditional religions and tribalism as "primitive" and embraced western ideas of Christianity, modernity, and the nation state. One of the challenges faced by nationalists in unifying their nation after European rule were the divisions of tribes and the formation of ethnicism.

==== Repatriation and emigration ====
Ex-slave repatriation or the emigration of African-American, Caribbean, and Black British former slaves to Africa occurred mainly during the late 18th century to mid-19th century. In the cases of Sierra Leone and Liberia, both were established by former slaves who were repatriated to Africa within a 28-year period.

==== Americo-Liberian people ====
Americo-Liberian people are a Liberian ethnic group descended from African Americans, Afro-Caribbeans, and liberated Africans. Americo-Liberians trace their ancestry to free-born and formerly enslaved African Americans who emigrated in the 19th century and became the founders of the state of Liberia, often as part of early black nationalist and back-to-Africa movements.

==== Rastafari ====
Many Rastafari believe that Ethiopia is the Promised Land of the black people. While some take this to mean Africa in the figurative sense, others take it literally and seek to join or establish independent black nations in Africa. In the 1960s, a Rasta settlement was established in Shashamane, Ethiopia, on land made available by Haile Selassie's Ethiopian World Federation. The community faced many problems; 500 acres were confiscated by the Marxist government of Mengistu Haile Mariam. There were also conflicts with local Ethiopians, who largely regarded the incoming Rastas, and their Ethiopian-born children, as foreigners. The Shashamane community peaked at a population of 2,000, although subsequently declined to around 200.

Some Rastas have settled in Ghana, Nigeria, Gambia and Senegal.

==== Sierra Leone Creole people ====
Sierra Leone Creole people are an ethnic group of Sierra Leone descended from freed African-American, Afro-Caribbean, Black British, and Liberated African slaves who settled in the Western Area of Sierra Leone between 1787 and about 1885. Many of the black people who migrated to Sierra Leone did so as part of the early black nationalist and back-to-Africa movements. The colony was established by the British, supported by abolitionists, under the Sierra Leone Company, as a place for freedmen. The settlers called their new settlement Freetown. Today, the Sierra Leone Creoles are 1.2 percent of the population of Sierra Leone.

=== Caribbean ===
==== Bedwardism ====
Born in 1848 in Saint Andrew Parish, north of Kingston, Jamaica, Alexander Bedward was one of the most successful preachers of Jamaican Revivalism in the 1880s, and would become the central figure of the Jamaica Native Baptist Free Church, or "Bedwardism". Bedward's version of Revivalism was motivated by the inequality he saw between Black and white workers while in Panama, and incorporated African influences. Bedward drew large groups of followers by conducting services which included reports of mass healings. He identified himself with Paul Bogle, the Baptist leader of the Morant Bay rebellion, and he stressed the need for changes to the inequalities in race relations in Jamaican society.

In 1889, Harrison "Shakespeare" Woods, an African-American immigrant, officially founded Bedwardism as a new religion in August Town, Saint Andrew Parish, with Bedward as its prophet—referred to as "That Prophet" and "Shepherd." Bedwardian literature described it as the successor to Christianity and Judaism, though its teachings differed little from those of most Christian denominations. Even so, because the movement likened the ruling classes to the Pharisees, it met with disapproval and even suppression. Bedwardism originated the belief that August Town, Jamaica corresponds to Jerusalem for the Western world, which would influence Rastafari beliefs. Bedward also variously claimed to be the reincarnation of prophets such as Moses, Jonah and John the Baptist, and was twice ruled insane by the colonial Jamaican courts. Bedwardism later drew inspiration from the rise of Marcus Garvey and his Universal Negro Improvement Association (UNIA).

The movement lost steam in 1921 after Bedward and hundreds of his followers marched into Kingston, where he failed to deliver on his claim to ascend into Heaven, and many were arrested. In 1930, Bedward died in his cell of natural causes. Many of his followers became Garveyites and Rastafarians, and brought with them the experience of resisting systems of colonial and white supremacist oppression. While some Rastafari cast Marcus Garvey as a Messiah, Bedward sometimes takes the role of John the Baptist.

==== Rastafari ====
Rastafari emerged from early Black nationalism and shaped the Black nationalism that followed. It was influenced by the Great Revival of 1860–61, which converted large numbers of Black preachers in Jamaica; and the Ethiopian movement within Black churches, which regarded the biblical "Ethiopia" as a synonym for Africa as a whole. By 1916, some Garveyists, Ethiopianists and Pan-Africanists believed Africa was poised for a great event, prophesied in Psalm 68:31 of the Bible: "Princes shall come of Egypt; Ethiopia shall soon stretch forth its hands unto God". Black Christians saw this as a promise of God's plan to lift Black people from oppression, as with the Israelites and early Christians before them, while early Black nationalists saw it as a call to action.

By the 1920s, some Black Christian groups had begun to develop their own canon of Afrocentric religious texts in opposition to the Eurocentrism of mainstream Christian churches. Between 1924 and 1928, Anguillan preacher Robert Athlyi Rogers, inspired Marcus Garvey, wrote the Holy Piby, also known as the Black Man's Bible. It was intended for an Afrocentric Abrahamic religion, known as the Afro-Athlican Constructive Gaathly. Rogers declared Garvey an "apostle of God" and dedicated the seventh chapter of the Holy Piby to him. His theology described Black people as God's chosen people, and preached self-reliance and self-determination. Around 1926, Jamaican preacher Fitz Balintine Pettersburg wrote The Royal Parchment Scroll of Black Supremacy, which decried white colonialism and the oppression of Black people. In the book, Pettersburg declared himself "King Alpha" and his wife as "Queen Omega", suggesting a fulfillment of the Ethiopianist promise of Psalm 68.

In August 1930, Marcus Garvey's play Coronation of an African King was performed in Kingston. Inspired by the coronation of Haile Selassie that same year, and drawing on Psalm 68, it featured the coronation of a fictional Sudanese prince. When Haile Selassie was crowned Emperor of Ethiopia in November, his Ethiopian title was Nəgusä Nägäst (literally "King of Kings", a common epithet for Jesus). He was the first sovereign monarch crowned in crowned in Sub-Saharan Africa since 1891. According to Ethiopian tradition, Haile Selassie was descended from King David, King Solomon, and the Queen of Sheba. Some Jamaican preachers, such as Archibald Dunkley and Joseph Hibbert, saw Selassie's coronation as proof he was the Black messiah they saw prophesied in the Book of Revelation, the Book of Daniel, and the Psalms. That year, Dunkley proclaimed Rastafari was the name of God, after Haile Selassie's pre-regnal title and name: Ras Tafari Makonnen. In 1933, he founded the King of Kings Ethiopian Mission in Kingston. In 1931, Hibbert, a former member of the Ancient Order of Ethiopia masonic lodge, concluded that Haile Selassie was divine after studying the Ethiopian Bible. He left the Ethiopian Baptist Church, founded by the 18th-century Jamaican Baptist George Lisle, and formed the Ethiopian Coptic Faith ministry, in St. Andrew Parish. When he later transferred his ministry to Kingston, he found Leonard Howell was already teaching similar doctrines.

From 1933, Howell had begun preaching that Selassie was the "Messiah returned to earth"—an important symbol for the African diaspora. Under his Hindu pen name G. G. Maragh (for Gangung Guru), Howell published The Promised Key, which synthesized material from the Royal Parchment Scroll of Black Supremacy and the Holy Piby. Most significantly, the identities of "King Alpha and Queen Omega" were changed from Pettersburg and his wife to Selassie and Empress Menen Asfaw, solidifying the prophecy of Psalm 68. This Howellite innovation became an article of faith for many Rastafari. Howell later formed the Pinnacle settlement in Saint Catherine Parish that became associated with Rastafari. Rastafari's new Black religious canon—with its anti-colonial message, and promotion of a positive Black identity—threatened colonial authorities who attempted to quell the growing movement with the arrest, trial for sedition, and imprisonment of these early Black preachers.

In 1937, the Ethiopian World Federation (EWF) was founded in New York City by Dr. Malaku Bayen and Dorothy Bayen, under the advice of Haile Selassie. Dr. Bayen was the cousin and personal physician of the Emperor, and a prince. Dunkley, Hibbert and Howell would also join the organization, which aimed to mobilize African American support for the Ethiopians during the Italian invasion of 1935-41, and to embody the unity of Black people worldwide. Ethiopia's resistance against European imperialism made it a source of pride and inspiration among Black people in the diaspora.

=== Europe ===
==== Black Liberation Front ====
The Black Liberation Front (BLF) formed in London in 1971 and ceased activities in 1993. Much more secretive than the British Black Panthers, most of their members remained anonymous, but it was nevertheless considered one of the most effective Black Power organizations in the UK, despite threats and attacks from the National Front, the media and the police, as well as state surveillance.

The BLF's politics were informed by Pan-African socialism and black nationalism. The BLF had links with Pan-African groups worldwide, often sending money back to Africa, and helped organize the Africa Liberation Day celebrations in the 1970s and 1980s. They also published the Grassroots Newspaper, which often featured creative work, alongside news on anti-colonial movements back in Africa and the Caribbean.

BLF was especially concerned with educational inequalities in the UK. Because black-authored books were extremely difficult to source in London at the time, the BLF established three book shops filled with black history, black politics and black literature. The Grassroots store front on Ladbroke Grove was one of these book shops, and became a community hub. The Headstart bookshop provided information for young people and at the weekends, volunteers ran math, English and black history classes there.

BLF ran prisoner welfare schemes, and schemes to support black women. Ujima Housing Association was established by the BLF to address issues around discrimination in housing. Young people and mothers were especially welcome. By 2008, when Ujima was merged into London and Quadrant, its assets were valued at £2 billion.

==== British Black Panther Movement ====
The British Black Panthers emerged after a 1967 visit by Stokey Carmichael and Malcolm X to London. The British chapter was officially formed the following year by Obi Egbuna and Darcus Howe. Egbuna had ambitions for the BBPM to be a militant, underground revolutionary organization. When Althea Jones-LeCointe later came to lead the organization, she wanted it to remain a grassroots organization, focused on the plight of workers, the unemployed, and young people. The BBPM also published a newspaper, Black Peoples News Service, and focused on injustice in education, policing, and government. The chapter was dissolved in 1972, but famous members included Neil Kenlock, Linton Kwesi Johnson, Olive Morris, Barbara Beese, Liz Obi and Beverley Bryan.

=== North America ===
==== Black Panther Party ====
The Black Panther Party (originally the Black Panther Party for Self-Defense) was a Marxist–Leninist and black power political organization founded by college students Bobby Seale and Huey P. Newton in October 1966 in Oakland, California. Originally, the party organized in an emergent black nationalist tradition inspired by Malcolm X and others. Upon its inception, the party's core practice was its open carry patrols ("copwatching") designed to challenge the excessive force and misconduct of the Oakland Police Department. From 1969 onward, the party created social programs, including the Free Breakfast for Children Programs, education programs, and community health clinics. The Black Panther Party advocated for class struggle, claiming to represent the proletarian vanguard.

The party was active in the United States between 1966 and 1982, with chapters in many major American cities, including San Francisco, New York City, Chicago, Los Angeles, Seattle, and Philadelphia. They were also active in many prisons and had international chapters in the United Kingdom and Algeria.

==== Malcolm X ====
Between 1953 and 1964, while most African leaders worked in the civil rights movement to integrate African-American people into mainstream American life, Malcolm X was an avid advocate of Black independence and the reclaiming of Black pride and masculinity. He initially maintained that Black people were better served by separatism—with control of politics and economics within their own communities—than the tactics of civil rights leader Rev. Martin Luther King Jr. and mainstream civil rights groups such as the SCLC, SNCC, NAACP, and CORE. Malcolm X believed that to achieve anything, African Americans would have to reclaim their national identity, embrace the rights covered by the Second Amendment, and defend themselves from white hegemony and extrajudicial violence.

In April 1964, Malcolm X participated in a Hajj (pilgrimage to Mecca); Malcolm subsequently shifted to mainstream Islam and recanted many of his earlier opinions, including his prior commitment to Black separatism. He still supported Black cultural nationalism and advocated for African Americans to proactively campaign for equal human rights, instead of relying on white citizens to change the laws. Malcolm X articulated his new philosophy in the charter of his Organization of Afro-American Unity (which he patterned after the Organization of African Unity), and he inspired some aspects of the future Black Panther Party.

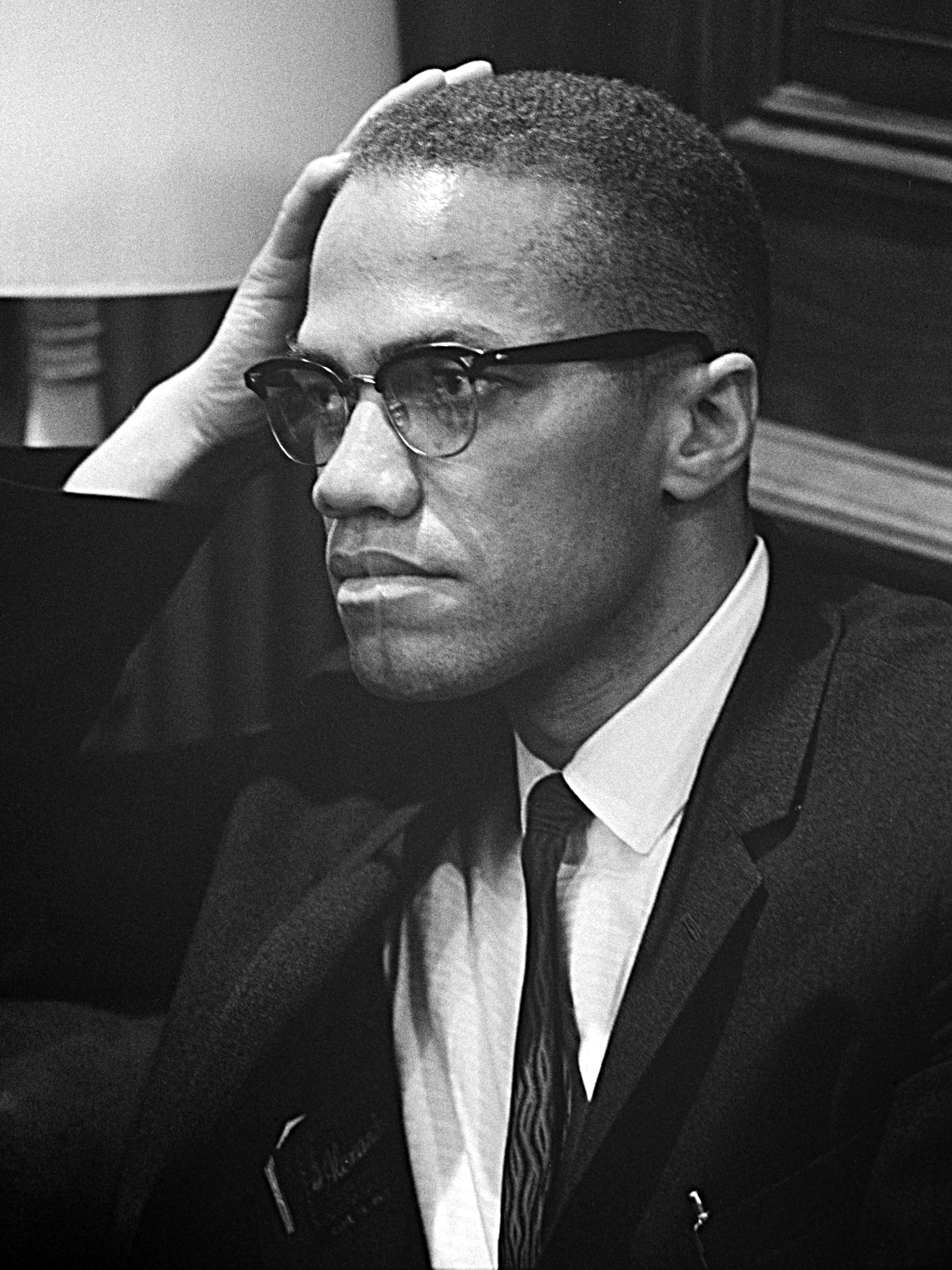
1964 photograph of Malcolm X

In 1965, Malcolm X expressed reservations about Black nationalism, saying, "I was alienating people who were true revolutionaries dedicated to overturning the system of exploitation that exists on this earth by any means necessary. So I had to do a lot of thinking and reappraising of my definition of black nationalism. Can we sum up the solution to the problems confronting our people as black nationalism? And if you notice, I haven't been using the expression for several months."

==== Nation of Islam ====
Like Rastafari, Nation of Islam was partly influenced by Garveyism. Wallace D. Fard founded the Nation of Islam in the 1930s as a reaction to the perceived white supremacy of Christianity. Since 1977, it has been under Louis Farrakhan's leadership. High-profile members included the Black nationalist activist Malcolm X and the boxer Muhammad Ali. The group believed Christianity had been forced on Black people during slavery, that Islam was the original religion of Black people, and that Black identity could be reclaimed through Islam.

Deviating significantly from mainstream Islam, Muhammad also taught that Fard was a Messiah and that he himself was sent by God to prepare Black people for global supremacy and destruction of "the white devil". The Nation promoted economic self-sufficiency for Black people, and talked of establishing a separate Black nation in Georgia, Alabama, or Mississippi.

== Black nationalism in popular culture ==
=== Political hip hop ===
As hip hop is a music genre originally created and dominated by African-Americans, political rappers often reference and discuss black liberation, black nationalism and the black power movement. Numerous hip hop songs express anti-racist views, such as the popular The Black Eyed Peas song "Where Is the Love?". Artists who advocate more radical black liberationist views have remained controversial. Artists such as Public Enemy, Tupac Shakur, Ice Cube, Game, and Kendrick Lamar have advocated black liberation in their lyrics and poetry. In Tupac Shakur's poem, "How Can We Be Free", Shakur discusses the sacrifices of black political prisoners and the rejection of patriotic symbols.

In the 2010s, artists such as Killer Mike and Kendrick Lamar have released songs criticizing the war on drugs and the prison industrial complex from an anti-racist perspective. Hip hop music continues to draw attention to the struggles of black people and attracts a young demographic of activists. Kendrick Lamar and many other rappers have been credited with creating discussions regarding "blackness" through their music.

== Criticism ==
=== General criticism ===
In his Letter from Birmingham Jail, Martin Luther King Jr. characterized black nationalism with "hatred and despair", writing that support for black nationalism "would inevitably lead to a frightening racial nightmare."

Norm R. Allen Jr., former director of African Americans for Humanism, calls black nationalism a "strange mixture of profound thought and patent nonsense":

On the one hand, Reactionary Black Nationalists (RBNs) advocate self-love, self-respect, self-acceptance, self-help, pride, unity, and so forth—much like the right-wingers who promote 'traditional family values.' But—also like the holier-than-thou right-wingers—RBNs promote bigotry, intolerance, hatred, sexism, homophobia, anti-Semitism, pseudo-science, irrationality, dogmatic historical revisionism, violence, and so forth.

Tunde Adeleke, Nigerian-born professor of History and Director of the African American Studies program at the University of Montana, argues in his book UnAfrican Americans: Nineteenth-Century Black Nationalists and the Civilizing Mission that 19th-century African American nationalism embodied the racist and paternalistic values of Euro-American culture and that black nationalist plans were not designed for the immediate benefit of Africans but to enhance their own fortunes.

In Black Nationalism in America, John H. Bracey Jr., August Meier and Elliott Rudwick argue, "In the arena of politics, black nationalism at its mildest is bourgeois reformism, a view which assumes that the United States is politically pluralistic and that liberal values concerning democracy and the political process are operative."

Dean E. Robinson, meanwhile, argues that "modern black nationalism drew upon strategies for political and economic empowerment that had analogies in the wider political landscape" and that, shaped by circumstances in America, black nationalists merely began to "do what other 'ethnic' groups had done" — i.e., "pursue their interests in a pluralistic political system, subsumed by a capitalistic economic one".

=== Criticism by black feminist activists ===
Black feminists in the U.S., such as Barbara Smith, Toni Cade Bambara, and Frances Beal, have also lodged sustained criticism of certain strands of black nationalism, particularly the political programs which are advocated by cultural nationalists. Black cultural nationalists envisioned black women only in the traditional heteronormative role of the idealized wife-mother figure.

Patricia Hill Collins criticizes the limited imagining of black women in cultural nationalist projects, writing that black women "assumed a particular place in Black cultural nationalist efforts to reconstruct authentic Black culture, reconstitute Black identity, foster racial solidarity, and institute an ethic of service to the Black community."

A major example of black women as only the heterosexual wife and mother can be found in the philosophy and practice called Kawaida exercised by the US Organization. Maulana Karenga established the political philosophy of Kawaida in 1965. Its doctrine prescribed distinct roles between black men and women. Specifically, the role of the black woman as "African Woman" was to "inspire her man, educate her children, and participate in social development." Historian of black women's history and radical politics Ashley Farmer records a more comprehensive history of black women's resistance to sexism and patriarchy within black nationalist organizations, leading many Black Power era associations to support gender equality.

=== Black nationalist hate groups ===
==== Black nationalism and antisemitism ====
Due to the high-profile nature of changing African American–Jewish relations, there is much research on antisemitism among black nationalist groups and individuals. In the late 1950s, both Muslim and non-Muslim black nationalists engaged in antisemitism. Some activists argued that American Jews, as well as Israel, were "the central obstacle to black progress" and that Jews were "the most racist whites", or they portrayed Jews as "parasitic intruders who accumulated wealth by exploiting the toil of black people in America's ghettos and South Africa". Some black nationalists have alleged that black people "are the original Semites", have engaged in Holocaust trivialization, or may even be Holocaust deniers.

Notable black nationalist leaders, particularly Louis Farrakhan, have professed antisemitic sentiments. Amiri Baraka, Kwame Ture, Tamika Mallory have been accused of antisemitic comments. There has also been the conflation of anti-Zionism and antisemitism in discussions about Black radical activists.

==== Black nationalism and the Southern Poverty Law Center ====
The Southern Poverty Law Center (SPLC) said that while black nationalist and black separatist hate groups exist, "The black nationalist movement is a reaction to centuries of institutionalized white supremacy in America," and it also notes that there is a lack of high-level political support for black nationalist and black separatist groups as opposed to white supremacist groups. According to the SPLC, black nationalist groups face a "categorically different" environment than white hate groups in the United States; while white supremacy has been championed by influential figures within the Donald Trump administration, black nationalists have "little or no impact on mainstream politics and no defenders in high office".

The SPLC has designated a number of black nationalist groups as hate groups, including the Black Riders Liberation Party, The Israelite Church of God in Jesus Christ, the Israelite School of Universal Practical Knowledge, the New Black Panther Party, the Revolutionary Black Panther Party and The United Nuwaupians Worldwide.

The Southern Poverty Law Center has previously been criticized for conflating black nationalism with hate more generally. It later clarified that "black nationalists are assessed as a loose-knit network of various hate groups, charismatic leaders, as well as unaffiliated individuals who may identify as black nationalists, but [who] do not associate with black nationalist groups," and reiterated that "violent black nationalists" were distinct from other forms of black activism. They also challenged the notion that black activists of diverse ideologies should be grouped as "black identity extremists" by the FBI.

In October 2020, the SPLC announced that it would no longer use the category "black separatism", in order to foster a more accurate understanding of violent extremism and avoid creating a false equivalency between black separatism and white supremacist extremism. This change in the terminology which is used by the SPLC also includes the removal of "black nationalism" as a category of hate groups from the SPLC's website.

== See also ==
- African-American history
- African diaspora
- Afrocentrism
- Back-to-Africa movement
- Black Consciousness Movement – South African anti-apartheid movement, 1960s
- Black Lives Matter
- Black power
- Black separatism
- Black supremacy
- Ethnic nationalism
- Négritude – Cultural and political movement developed by a francophone African elite
- Pan-Africanism
- Racial nationalism
- Kémi Séba
