= History of Rastafari =

The Rastafari movement developed out of the legacy of the Atlantic slave trade, in which over ten million Africans were enslaved and transported to the Americas between the 16th and 19th centuries. Once there, they were sold to European planters and forced to work on their plantations. Around a third of these transported Africans were relocated in the Caribbean, with under 700,000 being settled in Jamaica. In 1834, slavery in Jamaica was abolished after the British government passed the Slavery Abolition Act 1833. Racial prejudice nevertheless remained prevalent across Jamaican society. The overwhelming majority of Jamaica's legislative council was white throughout the 19th century, and those of African descent were treated as second-class citizens.

Christian revivalism was a key influence on Rastafari. Many Afro-Jamaicans joined Christian churches during the Great Revival of 1860–61. They brought with them many inherited African beliefs and rituals, which they syncretised with Christianity in various ways. Some of the new religions that emerged, such as Kumina, remained heavily based on traditional African religion, while others, such as Revival Zion, were more fully Christian. The majority of these groups practiced spiritual healing and incorporated drumming and chanting, counselling, and spirit possession into their structures. Increasing numbers of Pentecostal missionaries from the United States arrived in Jamaica during the early 20th century, this migration reaching a climax in the 1920s. They provided a way for Afro-Jamaicans—who continued to live with the social memory of enslavement and who were denied any substantial participation in Jamaica's political institutions—to express their hopes, fears, and aspirations.

== Ethiopianism, Back to Africa, and Marcus Garvey ==
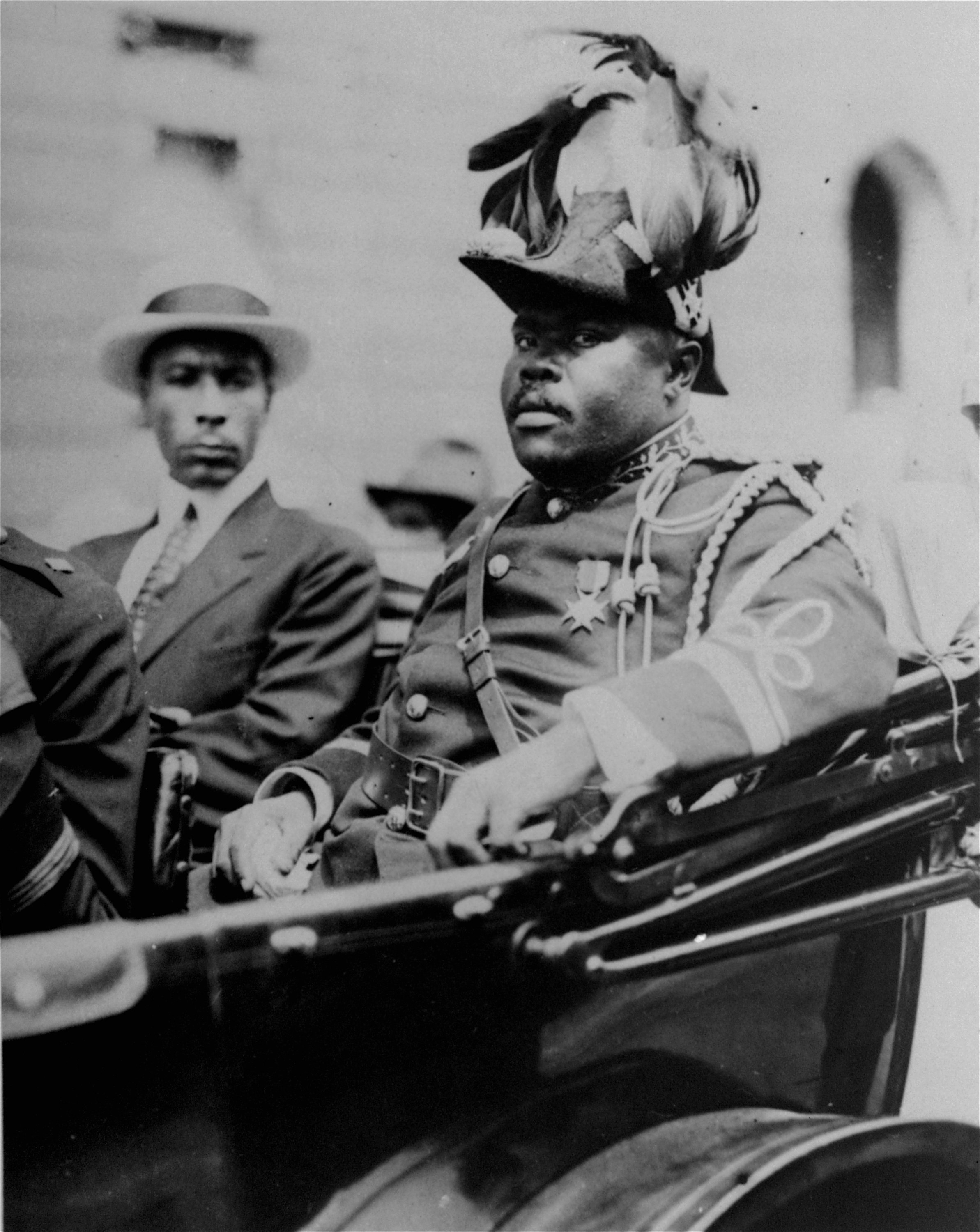
Marcus Garvey, a prominent black nationalist theorist who heavily influenced Rastafari and is regarded as a prophet by many Rastas

According to Edmonds, Rastafari emerged from "the convergence of several religious, cultural, and intellectual streams", while fellow scholar Wigmoore Francis described it as owing much of its self-understanding to "intellectual and conceptual frameworks" dating from the 19th and early 20th centuries. Both Ethiopianism and the Back to Africa ethos, traditions with 18th century roots, constituted "fundamental ingredients of Rastafarian ideology".

In the 19th century, there were growing calls for the African diaspora located in Western Europe and the Americas to be resettled in Africa. In that century, many members of the African diaspora moved to colonies founded in Sierra Leone and Liberia. Based in Liberia, the black Christian preacher Edward Wilmot Blyden began promoting African pride and the preservation of African tradition, customs, and institutions. Blyden sought to promote a form of Christianity that was suited to the African context and believed that black people had to acquire their own historical knowledge about themselves. The idea of the African diaspora's return to Africa was later given impetus by the creation of the State of Israel in 1948 as a nation-state for the Jewish diaspora to return to.

Also spreading throughout Africa was Ethiopianism, a movement that accorded special status to the east African nation of Ethiopia because it was mentioned in various Biblical passages. For adherents of Ethiopianism, "Ethiopia" was regarded as a synonym of Africa as a whole. Across the continent, although particularly in South Africa, Christian churches were established that referred to themselves as "Ethiopian"; these groups were at the forefront of the burgeoning African nationalist movement that sought liberation from European colonial rule.

Of significant influence on Rastafari was the Jamaican-born activist Marcus Garvey, who spent much of his adult life in the US and Britain. Garvey supported the idea of global racial separatism and rejected the idea that black people of African descent living in the Americas should campaign for their civil rights; instead he believed that they should migrate en masse back to Africa. His ideas were opposed by many blacks in the Americas and he experienced hostility from African-American civil rights activists like W. E. B. Du Bois. He also faced opposition from the Liberian government, which did not want millions of unskilled migrants arriving on its shores. As a mass movement, Garveyism declined in the Great Depression of the 1930s.

A rumour later spread that in 1916, Garvey had called on his supporters to "look to Africa" for the crowning of a black king; this quote was never verified. However, in August 1930 a play that Garvey had written, Coronation of an African King, was performed in Kingston's Edelweiss Park. Its plot revolved around the crowning of the fictional Prince Cudjoe of Sudan, although it anticipated the crowning of Haile Selassie later that year. Garvey would become critical of Haile Selassie for leaving Ethiopia during the Italian occupation, describing the king as "a great coward" who rules a "country where black men are chained and flogged." Rastafari does not promote all of the views that Garvey espoused, but nevertheless shares many of the same perspectives. Rastas hold Garvey in great esteem, with many regarding him as a prophet. According to Soumahoro, Rastafari "emerged from the socio-political ferment inaugurated by Marcus Garvey", while for Cashmore, Garvey was the "most important" precursor of Rastafari. Garvey knew of the Rastas but his view of them, according to the scholar Barry Chevannes, "bordered on scorn". According to Chevannes, Garvey would have regarded the Rastas' belief in the divinity of Haile Selassie as blasphemy.

== Haile Selassie and the early Rastas: 1930–1949 ==
Haile Selassie was crowned Emperor of Ethiopia in 1930, becoming the first sovereign monarch crowned in Sub-Saharan Africa since 1891 and first Christian one since 1889. A number of Jamaica's Christian clergymen claimed that Selassie's coronation was evidence that he was the black messiah that they believed was prophesied in the Book of Revelation (5:2–5; 19:16), the Book of Daniel (7:3), and the Book of Psalms (68:31). Over the following years, several street preachers—most notably Leonard Howell, Archibald Dunkley, Robert Hinds, and Joseph Hibbert—began promoting the doctrine that Haile Selassie was the returned Jesus. They first did so in Kingston, and soon the message spread throughout 1930s Jamaica, especially among poor communities who were hit particularly hard by the Great Depression. Clarke stated that "to all intents and purposes this was the beginning" of the Rastafari movement.

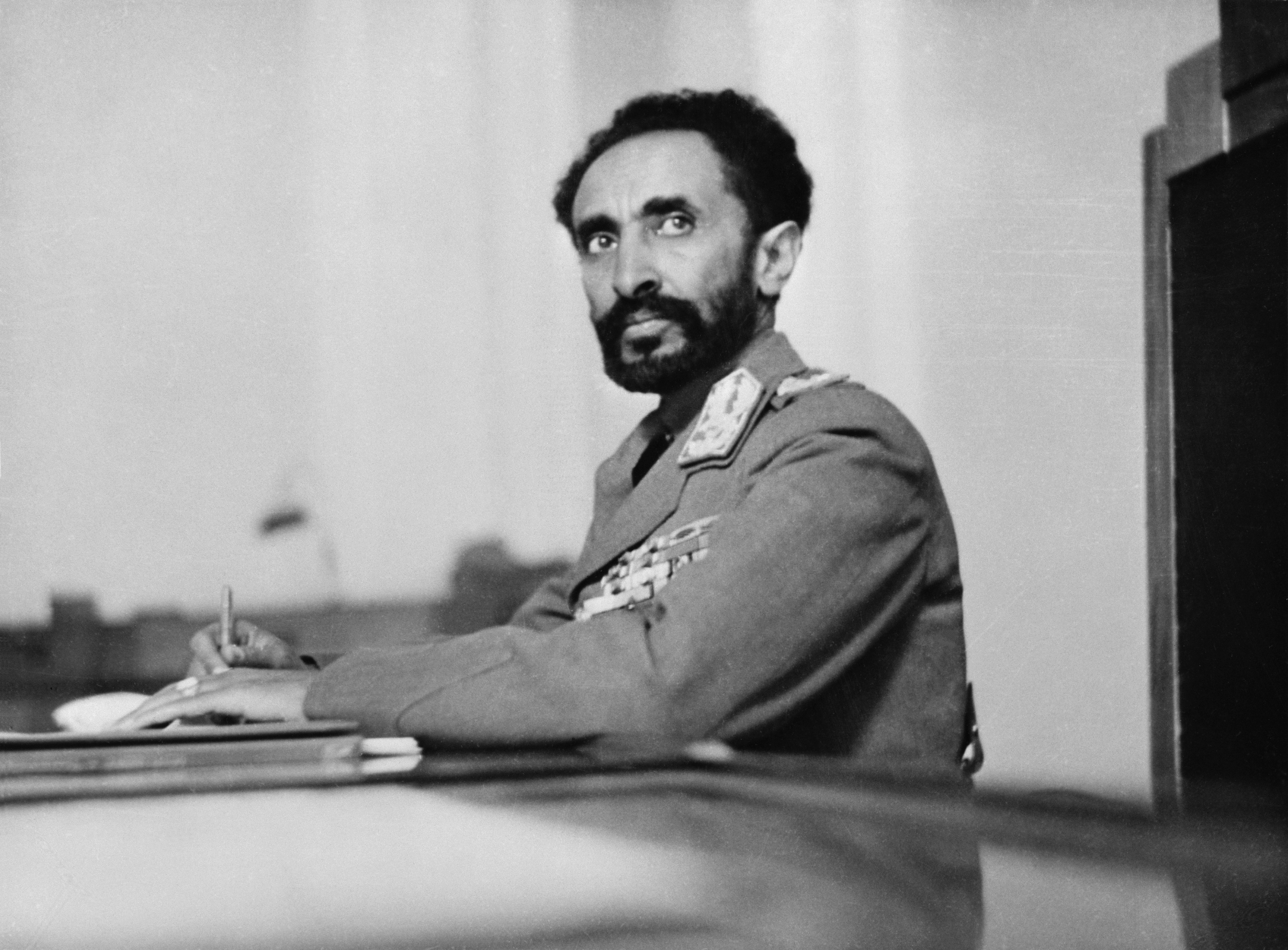
Emperor Haile Selassie in 1942, a year after he re-took control of Ethiopia

Howell has been described as a "leading figure" in the early Rastafari movement. He preached that Jamaicans should owe their allegiance to Haile Selassie rather than to George V, King of Great Britain and Ireland. The island's British authorities arrested him and charged him with sedition in 1934, resulting in his two-year imprisonment. Following his release, Howell established the Ethiopian Salvation Society and in 1939 established a Rasta community known as Pinnacle, in Saint Catherine Parish. Attracting between 500 and 2000 people, his community became largely self-sufficient. Police feared that Howell was training his followers for an armed rebellion and were angered that it was producing cannabis for sale. They raided the community on several occasions and Howell was imprisoned for a further two years. Upon his release he returned to Pinnacle, but the police continued with their raids and shut down the community in 1954; Howell himself was committed to a mental hospital.

In 1936, Italy invaded and occupied Ethiopia, and Haile Selassie went into exile. The invasion brought international condemnation and led to growing sympathy for the Ethiopian cause. In 1937, Selassie created the Ethiopian World Federation, which established a branch in Jamaica later that decade. In 1941, the British drove the Italians out of Ethiopia and Selassie returned to reclaim his throne. Many Rastas interpreted this as the fulfilment of a prophecy made in the Book of Revelation (19:11–19).

== Growing visibility: 1950–1969 ==
Rastafari's main appeal was among the lower classes of Jamaican society. For its first thirty years, Rastafari was in a conflictual relationship with the Jamaican authorities. Jamaica's Rastas expressed contempt for many aspects of the island's society, viewing the government, police, bureaucracy, professional classes, and established churches as instruments of Babylon. Relations between practitioners and the police were strained, with Rastas often being arrested for cannabis possession. During the 1950s the movement grew rapidly in Jamaica itself and also spread to other Caribbean islands, the United States, and the United Kingdom.

In the 1940s and 1950s, a more militant brand of Rastafari emerged. The vanguard of this was the House of Youth Black Faith, a group whose members were largely based in West Kingston. Backlash against the Rastas grew after a practitioner of the religion allegedly killed a woman in 1957. In March 1958, the first Rastafarian Universal Convention was held in Back-o-Wall, Kingston. Following the event, militant Rastas unsuccessfully tried to capture the city in the name of Haile Selassie. Later that year they tried again in Spanish Town. The increasing militancy of some Rastas resulted in growing alarm about the religion in Jamaica. According to Cashmore, the Rastas became "folk devils" in Jamaican society. In 1959, the self-declared prophet and founder of the African Reform Church, Claudius Henry, sold thousands of tickets to Afro-Jamaicans, including many Rastas, for passage on a ship that he claimed would take them to Africa. The ship never arrived and Henry was charged with fraud. In 1960 he was sentenced to six years imprisonment for conspiring to overthrow the government. Henry's son was accused of being part of a paramilitary cell and executed, confirming public fears about Rasta violence. One of the most prominent clashes between Rastas and law enforcement was the Coral Gardens incident of 1963, in which an initial skirmish between police and Rastas resulted in several deaths and led to a larger roundup of practitioners. Clamping down on the Rasta movement, in 1964 the island's government implemented tougher laws surrounding cannabis use.

At the invitation of Jamaica's government, Haile Selassie visited the island for the first time on 21 April 1966, with thousands of Rastas assembled in the crowd waiting to meet him at the airport. The event was the high point of their discipleship for many of the religion's members. Over the course of the 1960s, Jamaica's Rasta community underwent a process of routinisation, with the late 1960s witnessing the launch of the first official Rastafarian newspaper, the Rastafarian Movement Association's Rasta Voice. The decade also saw Rastafari develop in increasingly complex ways, as it did when some Rastas began to reinterpret the idea that salvation required a physical return to Africa, instead interpreting salvation as coming through a process of mental decolonisation that embraced African approaches to life.

Whereas its membership had previously derived predominantly from poorer sectors of society, in the 1960s Rastafari began attracting support from more privileged groups like students and professional musicians. The foremost group emphasising this approach was the Twelve Tribes of Israel, whose members came to be known as "Uptown Rastas". Among those attracted to Rastafari in this decade were middle-class intellectuals like Leahcim Semaj, who called for the religious community to place greater emphasis on scholarly social theory as a method of achieving change. Although some Jamaican Rastas were critical of him, many came under the influence of the Guyanese black nationalist academic Walter Rodney, who lectured to their community in 1968 before publishing his thoughts as the pamphlet Groundings. Like Rodney, many Jamaican Rastas were influenced by the U.S.-based Black Power movement. After Black Power declined following the deaths of prominent exponents such as Malcolm X, Michael X, and George Jackson, Rastafari filled the vacuum it left for many black youth.

== International spread and decline: 1970–present ==
In the mid-1970s, reggae's international popularity exploded. The most successful reggae artist was Bob Marley, who—according to Cashmore—"more than any other individual, was responsible for introducing Rastafarian themes, concepts and demands to a truly universal audience". Reggae's popularity led to a growth in "pseudo-Rastafarians", individuals who listened to reggae and wore Rasta clothing but did not share its belief system. Many Rastas were angered by this, believing it commercialised their religion.

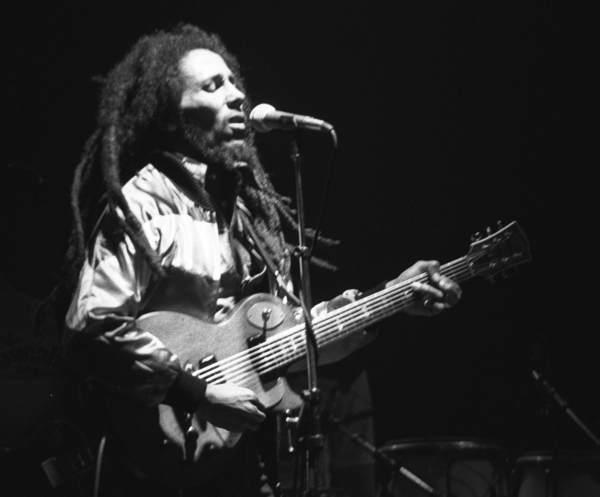
Reggae musician Bob Marley did much to raise international awareness of the Rastafari movement in the 1970s.

Through reggae, Rasta musicians became increasingly important in Jamaica's political life during the 1970s. To bolster his popularity with the electorate, Jamaican Prime Minister Michael Manley employed Rasta imagery and courted and obtained support from Marley and other reggae musicians. Manley described Rastas as a "beautiful and remarkable people" and carried a cane, the "rod of correction", which he claimed was a gift from Haile Selassie. Following Manley's example, Jamaican political parties increasingly employed Rasta language, symbols, and reggae references in their campaigns, while Rasta symbols became increasingly mainstream in Jamaican society. This helped to confer greater legitimacy on Rastafari, with reggae and Rasta imagery being increasingly presented as a core part of Jamaica's cultural heritage for the growing tourist industry. In the 1980s, a Rasta, Barbara Makeda Blake Hannah, became a senator in the Jamaican Parliament.

Enthusiasm for Rastafari was likely dampened by the death of Haile Selassie in 1975 and that of Marley in 1981. During the 1980s, the number of Rastas in Jamaica declined, with Pentecostal and other Charismatic Christian groups proving more successful at attracting young recruits. Several publicly prominent Rastas converted to Christianity, and two of those who did so—Judy Mowatt and Tommy Cowan—maintained that Marley had converted from Rastafari to Christianity, in the form of the Ethiopian Orthodox Church, during his final days. The significance of Rastafari messages in reggae also declined with the growing popularity of dancehall, a Jamaican musical genre that typically foregrounded lyrical themes of hyper-masculinity, violence, and sexual activity rather than religious symbolism.

The mid-1990s saw a revival of Rastafari-focused reggae associated with musicians like Anthony B, Buju Banton, Luciano, Sizzla, and Capleton. From the 1990s, Jamaica also witnessed the growth of organised political activity within the Rasta community, seen for instance through campaigns for the legalisation of cannabis and the creation of political parties like the Jamaican Alliance Movement and the Imperial Ethiopian World Federation Incorporated Political Party, none of which attained more than minimal electoral support. In 1995, the Rastafari Centralization Organization was established in Jamaica as an attempt to organise the Rastafari community.
