= Elder (Christianity) =

Leader in the field of some Christian denominations

In Christianity, an elder is a person who is valued for wisdom and holds a position of responsibility and authority in a Christian group. In some Christian traditions (e.g., Eastern Orthodoxy, Catholicism, Anglicanism, Methodism) an elder is an ordained person who serves a local church or churches and who has been ordained to a ministry of word, sacrament and order, filling the preaching and pastoral offices. In other Christian traditions (e.g., Presbyterianism, Churches of Christ, Plymouth Brethren), an elder may be a lay person serving as an administrator in a local congregation, or be ordained and serving in preaching (teaching during church gatherings) or pastoral roles. There is a distinction between ordained elders and lay elders. The two concepts may be conflated in everyday conversation (for example, a lay elder in the Baptist tradition may be referred to as "clergy", especially in America). In non-Christian world cultures the term elder refers to age and experience, and the Christian sense of elder is partly related to this.

== Elders in the Bible ==
Elders are mentioned in a number of New Testament passages. Individuals such as James had a significant role in the Jerusalem church and the Council of Jerusalem. In reference to churches in Antioch, Pisidia, Iconium, Lystra and Derbe, Paul appoints elders as a key step in organizing a new church and instructs Titus to appoint others. Paul spoke directly to the elders in Acts and warned them to "be on guard for themselves and for all the flock, among which the Holy Spirit has made them overseers, to shepherd the church of God which He purchased with His own blood."^{[Acts 20:28]} The book of Revelation identifies twenty-four elders with white robes and golden crowns on their heads seated on thrones around the One seated on the throne (Rev. 4:4, 10–11).

=== Terminology ===
The Christian office of "elder" is drawn from the word's various uses in the Bible. In many instances, particularly in the Old Testament, it has reference to the older men in a tribe, usually entrusted with the governmental affairs, whose counsel was frequently sought because of their age and experience. This was not necessarily a priesthood calling, although the Aaronic Priesthood is listed as having ordained elders. In the Septuagint, the word for Old Testament elders is πρεσβύτερος (presbuteros), as used in the New Testament for both Christian and Jewish leaders. Various traditions in Christianity translate the underlying term differently depending on their particular doctrinal or practical view of the role. In the Moravian Church, an elder is referred to as a Helper.

In addition to presbuteros, there are two other words used in the New Testament to describe various aspects of this position of leadership: 'overseer' and 'shepherd': Peter draws the three concepts together in one passage: "Therefore, I exhort the elders among you... shepherd the flock of God among you, exercising oversight."

==== Presbuteros ====
Presbuteros (πρεσβύτερος, Greek word #4245 in Strong's Concordance) is the most commonly used term for elder in the New Testament, stemming from presbus, elderly. It is used with regard to the twelve apostles, the seventy disciples or others acting in a specific role of authority in a local assembly of Christians. It is used twenty-eight times in the Gospels and Acts of the members of the Jewish Sanhedrin and twelve times in Revelation of the representatives of the redeemed people of God. The remaining nineteen times the word is employed in Acts and the Epistles, it identifies the leaders in the local churches of the New Testament. While no specific age is given, the connotation of seniority and experience in this term emphasizes the nature of the position and the character of the person, implying maturity, dignity, experience and honor.

The modern English words "priest" or "presbyter" are derived etymologically from presbyteros.

The New Testament meaning is taken by some scholars as the Latin word Legate which describes the ancient classical function as a herald who represents the highest state office and might be a governor of a province.

==== Episkopos ====
Episkopos (ἐπίσκοπος, Greek word #1985 in Strong's Concordance) was a common word in the Greek culture for any official who acted as a superintendent, manager, overseer, controller, curator, guardian or ruler. It occurs only five times in the New Testament, once referring to Christ and the other four times to church leaders. The Authorised Version translates the word as "bishop", emphasizing the function of an elder as exercising authority and supervision "by divine placement, initiative and design." The overseer can sometimes be viewed as a lead elder or as just one of a plurality of elders.

==== Poimen ====
Poimen (ποιμήν, Greek word #4166 in Strong's Concordance) means shepherd, also translated as pastor. It is applied only once in the noun form and three times in the verb form in the New Testament in the context of church leaders. The term emphasizes the elder as one who tends, feeds, guides, protects and cares for their flock.

=== Responsibilities of elders ===
The New Testament offers more instruction regarding elders than on many other important church subjects such as the Lord's Supper, the Lord's Day, baptism or spiritual gifts, and their duties are laid out in several places. In the majority of the references, the word for elders is plural and word for church is singular, suggesting that the pattern in the early church was for a plurality of elders in each local church. These were to be shepherds to their flock, setting an example - just like shepherds, they were to feed their flock, to work hard among them and to reprove where necessary and to care for the spiritual and physical needs of church members. Elders are considered rulers over their flocks and their judgement to be submitted to, not so that they can be "lords over God's heritage," but because they are to give account to God for the spiritual character of their church.

Elders must to be able to teach and preach doctrine, and identify whether teachings are incorrect, in order to avoid incorrect teachings within the church. To this end, they are also to train and appoint others. The elder is expected to serve with humility, remembering that their position within the Church is meant to emulate the qualities of Christ.

=== Qualifications ===
There are two key passages dealing with the qualifications of elders in the New Testament, 1Timothy 3:1–7 and Titus 1:6–9. The qualifications given by the Apostle Paul are as follows:

- Blameless as a steward of God, above reproach
- Faithful husband to his wife
- Temperate, sober, vigilant
- Sober-minded, prudent
- Of good behaviour, orderly, respectable
- Given to hospitality
- Able to teach
- Not given to wine
- Not violent, not pugnacious
- Patient, moderate, forbearing, gentle
- Uncontentious, not soon angry or quick-tempered
- Not covetous, not a lover of money
- Rules his own house well, his children are faithful, not accused of rebellion to God
- Not a novice or new convert
- Has a good rapport or reputation with outsiders
- Not self-willed
- A lover of what is good
- Just, fair
- Holy, devout
- Self-controlled
- Hold firmly to the faithful message as it has been taught

== Elders in the early church ==
Where elders are addressed in the writings of Paul and Peter, there is no inference of a monarchical episcopacy or single leaders in any of the New Testament-era churches, and presbuteros and episkopos are used interchangeably. This was still the case later in the century: the writings of the Apostolic Fathers (such as 1 Clement and the Didache) continue to assert the apostolic authority of the bishops/presbyters as rulers of the church making no distinction between the two terms. The epistle does imply a degree of authority residing in the Bishop of Rome. Writing c.199, Tertullian claimed that Clement was ordained by Peter himself as bishop of Rome, and although tradition identifies him as the fourth pope (after Linus and Anacletus) the order is much disputed. According to the Liber Pontificalis, Linus and Anacletus were ordained with responsibility for the church at Rome and Clement for the church as a whole

Another of the Apostolic Fathers, Ignatius of Antioch, records that many churches had single bishops by the beginning of the second century, although the church at Rome was not one of them. This became the norm by the middle of the century. Ignatius distinguished the relationship between bishop, presbyters and diaconate typologically and in doing so referred to the practice of a single bishop in a church, separated from the body of presbyters and deacons:

In like manner let all men respect the deacons as Jesus Christ, even as they should respect the bishop as being a type of the Father and the presbyters as the council of God and as the college of Apostles. Apart from these there is not even the name of a church. — Epistle of Ignatius to the Trallesians 3:1.

== Distinctions in practice ==
Church governance is generally organised in one of three main types:

- Episcopal polity, in which churches are governed in a hierarchical fashion, with the role of elders being fulfilled by external bishops. It is common in Anglican, Orthodox, Methodist, some Lutheran, and Catholic churches, and was prevalent up to and after the Reformation.
- Presbyterian polity, in which churches are governed on a denominational, geographical basis by committees of elders.
- Congregational polity, in which each church is responsible for its own governance. Churches employing this method include Baptist, Congregational, some Lutheran, and Plymouth Brethren churches. Some churches are led by a pastor; some maintain a plurality of elders.

=== Anglicans ===
An ordained Anglican minister is usually called a priest, holding the prenominal of Reverend if they are Low church or Sister or Father if they are High church. Lay preachers in the Anglican Communion are usually called Pastors, especially Chaplains and other pastoral office holders, who are not ordained but engage with a congregation or workplace in an advisory capacity. The title "Elder" is usually given to those Anglicans ministers who are not vicars, but hold a learned role within or beyond a congregation, such as a Reader who assists a priest or a Pioneer Minister who seeks to engage with those who are outside the traditional Anglican Communion structures.

=== Baptists ===
Historically, Baptist churches do not recognize elder as a separate office from those of pastor or deacon; it is commonly considered a synonym of deacon or pastor. This is not universal in Baptist circles, however, and there are many Baptist churches which are elder-led. Others have elder councils where pastoral functions are shared according to gifts, such as teaching, management and pastoral care.

=== Christadelphianism ===
Christadelphians do not appoint any form of clergy. Organisation is based on ecclesially accountable committees for evangelism, youth and Sunday School work, military service issues, care of the elderly and humanitarian work. These do not have any legislative authority and are wholly dependent upon support from within the church. Women are typically not eligible to teach in formal gatherings of the ecclesia when male believers are present, and do not sit on the main committees, however they do participate in other ecclesial and inter-ecclesial committees.

=== Churches of Christ ===
Congregations referring to themselves as Churches of Christ believe that local congregations should be led by a plurality of biblically qualified elders. They base this on a conviction that congregations (and Christians in general) should attempt to follow the teachings of the New Testament wherever humanly possible. In accordance with the teachings of the Bible the Churches of Christ teach and practice that only males may serve as elders (female elders are not recognized), and must meet Biblical qualifications (generally I Timothy 3:1-7 and Titus 1:5-9 are the Biblical texts used to determine if a male is qualified to serve as elder).

In this regard, elders are accountable to each other and to God. The evangelist and the elders have the spiritual oversight of the congregation (e.g., withdrawing fellowship from a member who the elders consider to be wayward in doctrine or refuses to abide by the elders' counsel or decision in a matter) as well as administrative oversight (e.g., overseeing the congregation budget).

The elders will be assisted by deacons who, depending on the congregation, may have a specific area of non-spiritual service (e.g., finance, building and grounds, benevolence); the deacons are in all matters subservient to the elders. An elder may also be qualified to serve as a deacon (and, in some cases, may have previously served as a deacon before becoming an elder).

Depending on the congregation, the elders may rotate main preaching and teaching duties or appoint one or more male persons (who may or may not be elders) to serve as the ministers for that congregation. If one person is assigned main preaching duties, he is never referred to as "Father" (based on Matthew 23:9, which states that the only Father a Christian has is in Heaven), nor is the individual referred to as "pastor" (due to belief that the one reference to "pastor" in Ephesians 4:11 is translated "shepherd" in all other cases, and in context either refers to Jesus Christ or to an elder; as stated above the person with main preaching duties may or may not be an elder) or "reverend" (due to belief that the one reference to this term in Psalm 111:9 refers to the reverence of God's name). Instead, common terms used are "evangelist", "preacher", "minister" (or "pulpit minister"; the latter may be used if the congregation has assistant or associate ministers over certain programs or functions), or "preaching elder" (if the person is also an elder).

=== The Church of Jesus Christ of Latter-day Saints ===
Elders are male members of the Church of Jesus Christ of Latter-day Saints who have the Melchizedek Priesthood and have been ordained to the office of elder, typically at the age of 18. Male missionaries of the Church, General Authorities and Area Authority Seventies are honorarily titled "Elder" unless they have duties (such as those of a Branch President) entitling them to be called President.

The duties of the ordained elders in the Church of Jesus Christ of Latter-day Saints are defined in the book of Doctrine and Covenants. Elder is the proper title given to all holders of the Melchizedek Priesthood. Thus an apostle is an elder in this sense, and it is proper to speak of members of the Quorum of the Twelve or the First Quorum of the Seventy by this title.

=== Church of Scotland ===
Governance in the Church of Scotland is based on presbyterian polity. There are several roles in the ministry including ministers of Word and Sacrament, chaplains, deacons and readers. Elders are another role, which is voluntary and un-salaried elders. They are ordained for life by the minister and Kirk Session of a parish, and carry out pastoral and local church government duties under the guidance of the minister. All elders are members of the Kirk session, and may train to chair the session, conduct funerals, preach and lead worship.

=== Congregationalism ===
Congregational churches observe the office of elder. Early congregationalist standards held a fourfold view of ecclesiastical offices: pastor, teacher, ruling elder, and deacon. In this view, pastor, teacher, and ruling elder are all types of elder. Later exponents like Henry Martyn Dexter advocated a twofold view of only elder and deacon, the pastor/teacher, elder, and overseer being different terms for the same office. The primary officer is ordinarily called the "pastor" or "minister." Ordination and installation of officers is a local event, without the oversight of elders outside of the local church as in presbyterianism.

Congregational churches generally form committees and boards, either entirely composed of elders and deacons or with non-official members appointed by the congregation.

=== Jehovah's Witnesses ===
Among Jehovah's Witnesses, an elder is a man appointed to teach the congregation. He is also called an "overseer" or "servant". Elders within each congregation work within a "body of elders", several of whom are assigned to oversee specific congregational tasks. Each body of elders has a coordinator (previously known as the presiding overseer), a secretary, and a service overseer. Witnesses consider the office of elder to be the same as that referred to in the Bible as "older man" ("presbyter"), overseer ("bishop"), and shepherd ("pastor") but do not use any of the terms as titles.

Representatives of the Governing Body of Jehovah's Witnesses select elders to be appointed as circuit overseers, (also referred to as traveling overseers). Each circuit overseer visits the congregations in his jurisdiction twice each year. During his visit, local elders recommend members who may qualify for appointment as elders or ministerial servants (equivalent to deacons), and appointments are decided by the circuit overseer. Congregation elders do not receive monetary compensation; traveling overseers receive a modest stipend.

=== Lutheranism ===
An Elder in the Lutheran Church is a position of lay-service, concerned with the temporal and administrative affair of the congregation. In many congregations, elders provide help, support, and encouragement for the pastor's administrative and spiritual tasks. They are also assigned to assist the pastor in the sacraments (the Eucharist and Baptism). In the Eucharist, the Elder may assist in the distribution. In Baptism, the Elder may hold the water or assist the pastor by holding the liturgical book the pastor reads from when performing the rite. An elder is not permitted to consecrate the bread and wine in the Eucharist, or perform Holy Absolution, as these acts are reserved for the pastor.

However, many within the confessional wing of Lutheranism, see the term "elder" being used in such a way an unfortunate effect of Reformed (and broader Protestant) influence on the Lutheran Church. Elder (or Presbyteros, in the Greek) serving as a synonym for "Pastor" or "Priest", not unlike how Lutheran teaching also recognizes "episkopos" (Greek, meaning overseer), or bishop to be yet another synonym. Historic Lutheranism recognized a single office of Word and Sacrament being established directly by Christ; all distinctions within nomenclature and structural ranking were purely "jure humano" (of human make). Thus making a distinction between "pastor" and "elder" would seem pointless, and using the term "lay elder" would be oxymoronic.

=== Methodism ===
An Elder - sometimes called a "Presbyter" - is someone who has been ordained by a bishop to the ministry of Word, Sacrament, Order, and Service. Their responsibilities are to preach and teach, preside at the celebration of the sacraments, administer the church through pastoral guidance, and lead the congregations under their care in service ministry to the world. The office of Elder, then, is what most people tend to think of as the pastoral, priestly, clergy office within the church. Indeed, even a Methodist Bishop is still an Elder who has been elected and consecrated by the laying on of hands to the office of Bishop (Bishop being understood as an office within the Presbyterate, not an order or separate level of ordination). In some of the denominations within Methodism, ordination to the office of Elder is open to both women and men, while in others, such as the Primitive Methodist Church and Evangelical Wesleyan Church, it is only opened to men.

=== Plymouth Brethren ===
One of the key distinctions of Plymouth Brethren churches is the total rejection of the concept of clergy. In keeping with the doctrine of the priesthood of all believers, they view all Christians as being ordained by God to serve and therefore ministers. Leaders are chosen according to the qualifications found in 1Tim 3:1–7 and Titus 1:6–9, and appointed by the Holy Spirit. Plymouth Brethren churches tend to have multiple elders based on the plural use of the word in reference to New Testament churches.

One branch of the Plymouth Brethren, the Exclusive Brethren, are so named for their practice of serving the Lord's Supper exclusively to those who are part of their own particular group, agreeing with them on various doctrinal positions. Most Exclusive Brethren groups believe the church to have been in ruins between the death of the apostles and their own time. Since no truly apostolic authority exists to appoint elders the church has none. Instead they recognize "leading brothers" who demonstrate maturity and leadership ability.

=== Presbyterianism ===
Although practices in the Presbyterian Church vary internationally, typically the church recognises three offices within church polity: the minister (alternately "teaching elder" or "pastor"), a bench of ruling elders, and deacons. The elders are "ordained lay" people and form the session, which is a ruling council for their congregation.

=== Rastafari ===
Members of the Rastafari Movement often refer to their experienced members as elders, such as Joseph Hibbert, Vernon Carrington, Leonard Howell, and Mortimer Planno.

=== Radical Pietism ===
The Radical Pietistic communities, such as the Schwarzenau Brethren, do not believe in the swearing of oaths and also resolve problems at the congregational level under church councils presided by elders, rather than in civil courts. Members who sin openly are visited by the elders and encouraged to repent of their transgressions.

=== Roman Catholic Church ===
Members of the Catholic Church still use the Greek word Presbyter (πρεσβύτερος, presbuteros: "elder", or "priest" in Christian usage) to refer to priests (priest is etymologically derived from the Greek presbyteros via the Latin presbyter). Collectively, however, their "college" is referred to as the "presbyterium" (meaning "council of elders"), "presbytery", or "presbyterate."

The presbyterium is most visible during the ordination of new priests and bishops and the Mass of the Chrism (the Mass occurring on Maundy Thursday) where the blessing of the oils used in the sacraments of Baptism, Confirmation, Anointing of the Sick, and Holy Orders takes place. They are also visible during other special liturgical functions such as the wake and burial of their bishop.

=== Seventh-day Adventist Church (SDA) ===
"Elder" was the only honorific title used to distinguish church leadership during the formative years of the Seventh-day Adventist Church. Mrs. White, as in, Elder and Mrs. James White, is how the church's prophet, Ellen G. White, was universally referred to up until the late 20th century. The term "Elder" applies to both local church elders and to ordained ministers of the gospel. SDA nomenclature has never used the terms, priest, reverend or clergy as honorific titles or as work titles. For convenience "Pastor" is now regularly used to distinguish ordained ministers of the gospel from ordained local elders. SDA ordained Ministers of the Gospel are paid employees of the Seventh-day Adventist Church and they are required to also be Elders in the local church. Women can be ordained as local elders, but are not ordained as ministers of the Gospel. Women are commissioned as Pastors and are considered ministers of the Gospel. Men serving within the Adventist Church's organizational leadership, e.g. Local Conference/Union Conference/Division/General Conference offices are usually addressed as "Elder." But as an example; the current President of the General Conference, "Elder Ted Wilson" is sometimes addressed Pastor Ted Wilson.

=== Shakerism ===
Among the Shakers, noted for their acceptance of females in leading roles, Elders and Eldresses were leaders in specific areas. Two Elders and Eldresses headed the central Shaker ministry at the Mount Lebanon Shaker Society and dealt with both spiritual and temporal matters. Other pairs of elders and eldresses headed groups of Shaker communities, while others were spiritual leaders of smaller groups within the communities.

== See also ==
- American Indian elder
- Minister
- Ordination of women
- Pastor
- Political elder
- Priest
- Presbyter
- Thero, the Elders in Buddhist context
