= Black supremacy =

Belief in superiority of black people

Black supremacy is a racial supremacist belief which maintains that black people are inherently superior to people of other races.

== Historical usage ==
Black supremacy was advocated by Jamaican preacher Leonard Howell in the 1935 Rastafari movement tract The Promised Key. Howell's use of "Black Supremacy" had both religious and political implications. Politically, as a direct counterpoint to white supremacy, and the failure of white governments to protect black people, he advocated the destruction of white governments. Howell had drawn upon as an influence the work of the earlier proto-Rastafari preacher Fitz Balintine Pettersburg, in particular the latter's book The Royal Parchment Scroll of Black Supremacy.

The Associated Press described the teachings of the Nation of Islam (NOI) as having been black supremacist until 1975, when W. Deen Mohammed succeeded Elijah Muhammad (his father) as its leader. Elijah Muhammad's black-supremacist doctrine acted as a counter to the supremacist paradigm established and controlled by white supremacy. The SPLC described the group as having a "theology of innate black superiority over whites – a belief system vehemently and consistently rejected by mainstream Muslims".

== Groups associated with black supremacist views ==
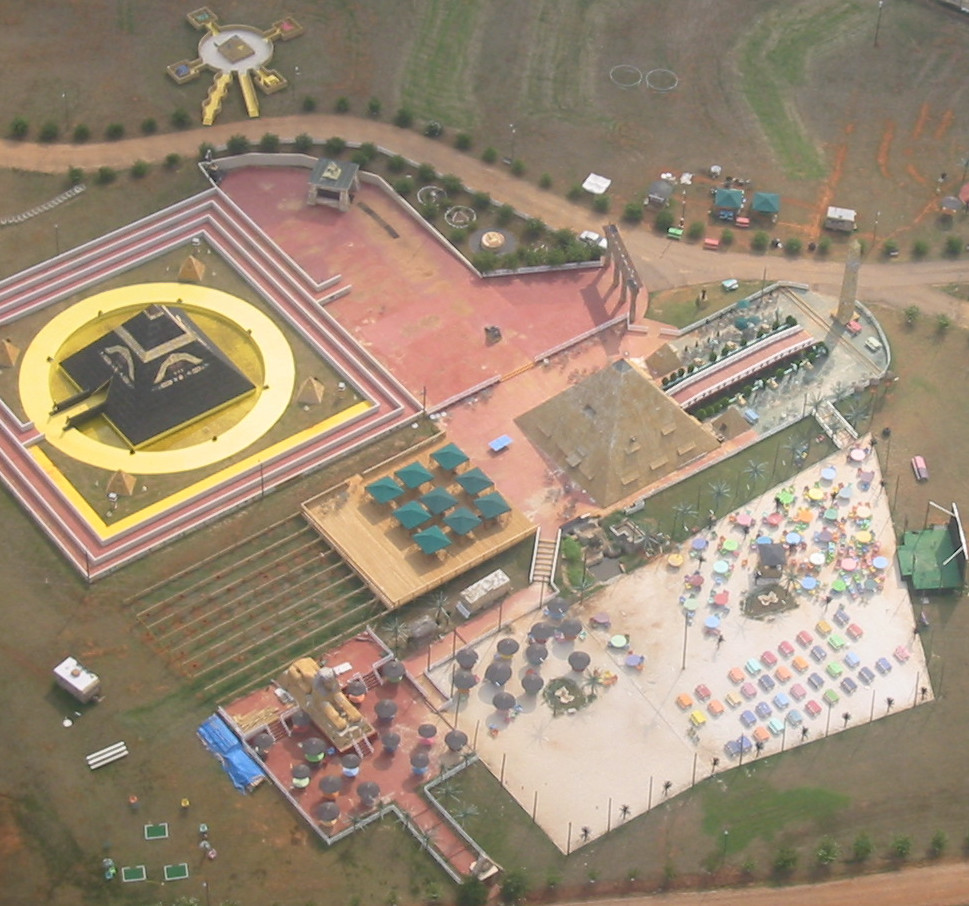
Central portion of Tama-Re, a village in the U.S. state of Georgia built in 1993 by the United Nuwaubian Nation of Moors, as seen from the air in 2002

Several fringe groups have been described as either holding or promoting black supremacist beliefs. A source described by historian David Mark Chalmers as being "the most extensive source on right-wing extremism" is the Southern Poverty Law Center (SPLC), an American nonprofit organization that monitors hate groups and extremists in the United States. Authors of the SPLC's quarterly Intelligence Reports have described the following groups as holding black supremacist views:

- The Israelite Church of God in Jesus Christ (ICGJC), which is headquartered in New York City, was described in 2008 by the SPLC as an American "black supremacist sect" and part of the growing "black supremacist wing of the Hebrew Israelite movement". The ICGJC accepts the Old and New Testaments and the Apocrypha as inspired Scripture and has an apocalyptic view of the end of the world.
- The Israelite School of Universal Practical Knowledge (ISUPK), based in the Upper Darby Township of Philadelphia.
- The Nation of Islam (NOI) is a religious organization founded by Wallace Fard Muhammad in the United States in 1930. They have been described by the SPLC as having "a theology of innate black superiority over whites". SPLC cites the NOI leaders' "deeply racist, antisemitic and anti-LGBT rhetoric" as reasons for the organization being categorized as a hate group.
- The Nation of Yahweh is a religious group based in the United States described as black supremacist by the SPLC. It is an offshoot of the Black Hebrew Israelite line of thought. It was founded by American Yahweh ben Yahweh (born Hulon Mitchell Jr.), whose name means "God the Son of God" in Hebrew. The Nation of Yahweh grew rapidly throughout the 1980s and at its height had headquarters in Miami, Florida, and temples in 22 states, ben Yahweh was imprisoned for 11 years for his links to nearly two dozen murders, and later released on restrictive parole.
- The United Nuwaubian Nation of Moors was founded by the American Dwight York, who has been described by the SPLC as advocating the belief that black people are superior to white people. The SPLC reported that York's teachings included the belief that "whites are 'devils', devoid of both heart and soul, their color the result of leprosy and genetic inferiority". The SPLC described the Nuwaubianism belief system as "mix[ing] black supremacist ideas with worship of the Egyptians and their pyramids, a belief in UFOs and various conspiracy theories related to the Illuminati and the Bilderbergers".

== Opposition from Martin Luther King Jr. ==
During speeches given at the Freedom Rally in Cobo Hall on June 23, 1963, at Oberlin College in June 1965, and at the Southern Methodist University on March 17, 1966, Martin Luther King Jr. said:

A doctrine of black supremacy is as dangerous as a doctrine of white supremacy. God is not interested merely in the freedom of black men or brown men or yellow men. God is interested in the freedom of the whole human race, the creation of a society where every man will respect the dignity and worth of personality.

== See also ==
- Afrocentrism
- Anti-White racism
- Black nationalism
- Black pride
- Black separatism
- Melanin theory
- Racial formation theory
