= Holy Piby =

Proto-Rastafari religious text

- Author: Robert Athlyi Rogers
- Publication date: 1924

The Holy Piby, also known as the Black Man's Bible, is a text written by an Anguillan, Robert Athlyi Rogers (d. 1931), for the use of an Afrocentric religion in the West Indies founded by Rogers in the 1920s, known as the Afro-Athlican Constructive Gaathly. The theology outlined in this work saw Ethiopians (in the classical sense of all Africans) as the chosen people of God. The church preached self-reliance and self-determination for Africans, using the Piby as its guiding document.

== Content ==
The Holy Piby is made up of four books. The first, entitled "The First Book of Athlyi Called Athlyi", has only two chapters. The next, "The Second Book of Athlyi Called Aggregation", is the largest, with fifteen chapters, the seventh of which identifies Marcus Garvey as one of three apostles of God. The "Third Book of Athlyi Named The Facts of the Apostles" presents two prominent members of the UNIA-ACL, Robert Lincoln Poston and Henrietta Vinton Davis, as the other apostles in the Holy Trinity. The title of the last book is "The Fourth Book of Athlyi Called Precaution". That book is followed by a series of catechism-style questions and answers wherein Garvey, Davis and Poston are proclaimed to be the saviors of the "down trodden children of Ethiopia".

== History ==
=== Rastafari movement ===
Together with the Royal Parchment Scroll of Black Supremacy by Fitz Balintine Pettersburg and Leonard P. Howell's The Promise Key, the Holy Piby is today recognized as a root document of Rastafari thought. While not strictly speaking a "Rastafari text", it was certainly a primary source of influence to many in the Rastafari movement, who see Emperor Haile Selassie I of Ethiopia, as the second coming of Christ. Some Rastafari see Emperor Haile Selassie I as Christ in His Kingly Character as written in the Book of Revelation, Chapter 5 and regard Marcus Mosia Garvey as a prophet.
