= Royal Parchment Scroll of Black Supremacy =

1920s text by Fitz Balintine Pettersburg

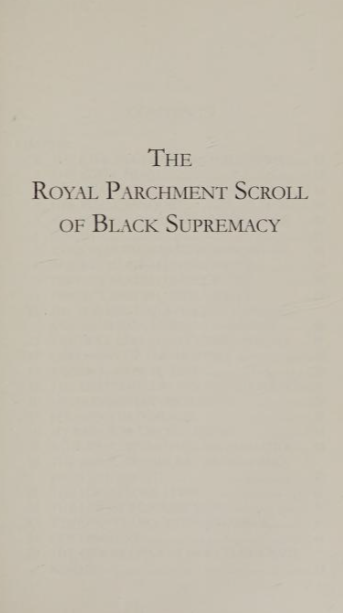
- Title page for The Royal Parchment Scroll of Black Supremacy (1925)
- Author: Fitz Balintine Pettersburg
- Publication date: 1925

The Royal Parchment Scroll of Black Supremacy is a text from Jamaica, written during the 1920s by a proto-Rastafari preacher, Fitz Balintine Pettersburg. The Royal Parchment Scroll is today recognized as one of the root documents of Rastafari thought, along with The Holy Piby and Leonard P. Howell's The Promise Key, which itself made considerable use of content from Pettersburg's work.

== See also ==
- Black supremacy
