= Grounation Day =

Rastafari holy day

Grounation Day (April 21) is the most important Rastafari holiday; it is celebrated in honor of Haile Selassie's 1966 visit to Jamaica.

== Visit of Selassie to Jamaica ==
Selassie had already met with several Rastafarian elders in Addis Ababa and had allowed Rastafari and other people of African descent to settle on his personal land in Shashamane.

Selassie visited Jamaica on Thursday, April 21, 1966. Some 100,000 Rastafari from all over Jamaica descended on Palisadoes Airport in Kingston, having heard that the man whom they considered to be God was coming to visit them. They waited at the airport playing drums and smoking large quantities of marijuana. The Rastafari celebrate Selassie's visit to Jamaica on April 21.

When Selassie's Ethiopian Airlines flight landed at the airport at 1:30 pm, the crowd surrounded his plane on the tarmac. The day had been overcast and stormy. After about half an hour, the door swung open, and the emperor appeared at the top of the mobile steps. A deafening tumult was heard from the crowd, who beat calabash drums, lit firecrackers, waved signs, and sounded Abeng horns of the Maroons. All protocol was abandoned as the crowd surged past security onto the red carpet for the reception. Selassie waved from the steps, and some interpreters claimed he shed tears, though this is debated. He returned to the plane and remained out of sight for several minutes. Jamaican authorities then requested Mortimer Planno, a Rastafari leader, to assist the emperor's descent. When Planno reemerged, he announced to the crowd: "The Emperor has instructed me to tell you to be calm. Step back and let the Emperor land." After Planno escorted the African monarch down the steps, journalists were puzzled by Selassie's refusal to walk on the red carpet on the way to his limousine (hence grounation, Iyaric equivalent of foundation, "uplifted" with the sound of the word ground in the sense of "making contact with the soil"). He was then driven to the King's House, the residence of Governor-General Clifford Campbell.

As a result of Planno's actions, the Jamaican authorities were asked to ensure that Rastafari representatives were present at all state functions attended by the ruler, and Rastafari elders, including Planno and probably Joseph Hibbert, also obtained a private audience with the emperor. He reportedly told them that they should not immigrate to Ethiopia until they had first liberated the people of Jamaica. This dictum came to be known as "liberation before repatriation". At a dinner held at the King's House, Rastafarians claimed that acting Jamaican prime minister Donald Sangster had stamped his foot at Lulu, Haile Selassie's pet chihuahua, who, they swore, had responded with the roar of a lion.

Defying expectations of the Jamaican authorities, Selassie never rebuked the Rastafari for their belief in him as the Messiah. Instead, he presented the movement's elders with gold medallions bearing the Ethiopian seal—the only recipients of such an honour on this visit. Meanwhile, he presented some of the Jamaican politicians, including Sangster, with miniature coffin-shaped cigarette boxes.

== Impact ==
Rita Marley, Bob Marley's wife, converted to the Rastafari faith after seeing Haile Selassie in his motorcade en route to the King's House. She claimed, in interviews and in her book No Woman No Cry, that she had seen a stigma on Haile Selassie's hand as he waved to the crowd, and was instantly convinced of his divinity.

For years afterward, Planno, who became a spiritual guru of Bob Marley, would give out enlarged photographs of himself with the Emperor on the steps of the aeroplane.

The great significance of this event in the development of the Rastafari religion is that, having been outcasts in society, its adherents gained a measure of respectability for the first time. With Rasta having become acceptable, reggae music became commercially viable, leading in turn to the further global spread of Rastafari.

Haile Selassie is thought to have encouraged the Rastafari elders to learn about the Ethiopian Orthodox faith while in Jamaica, and in 1970, he dispatched Archbishop Laike Mandefro to establish a mission in Jamaica. Mandefro was formally invited by Joseph Hibbert, one of the original founders of the Rastafari Movement, to teach the Rasta community, and in 1971 Mandefro named Hibbert as a "Spiritual Organizer". During this time, Mandefro pointedly refused calls to demand that the Rastafari renounce their faith in Haile Selassie's divinity, and some 2,000 Rastas accordingly received Orthodox baptisms.

Because of Haile Selassie's visit, April 21 is celebrated as Grounation Day. The "Abu Ye! Abu Ye Abu ye! Abu ye!" chant is an element of Grounation Day festivities.
