= Robert Athlyi Rogers =

Anguillian author (1891–1931)

Robert Athlyi Rogers (6 May 1891 – 24 August 1931), born in Anguilla, was the author of the Holy Piby, and founder of the "Afro-Athlican Constructive Church".

== Biography ==
He was born on the island of Anguilla on 6 May 1891, and immigrated to the United States as a youth. In 1917, Rogers wrote the Negro Map of Life and founded the United Home and Bank of the Negroes.

=== Ministry ===
According to Alfredo Nieves Moreno in the Encyclopedia of Puerto Rico, the 1920s and 1930s were an active and exciting time for the social movements that sought to highlight the importance of African heritage in the world. Among the most significant developments were the government of Ethiopian emperor Haile Selassie I and Marcus Mosiah Garvey's ideas of "Africa for Africans" and his Universal Negro Improvement Association (UNIA), which also inspired the Rastafarian movement begun by Leonard Percival Howell in Jamaica. Pastor Robert Athlyi Rogers emerged from this evolution of thought and philosophy about the black race.

Jamaican leader Marcus Mosiah Garvey had immigrated to the United States in 1916 and established a chapter of the UNIA there. In 1922, Rogers attended a UNIA meeting in Newark, New Jersey, and was very impressed with Garvey's discourse. Rogers' admiration for Garvey was such that he declared Garvey an "apostle of God" and dedicated the seventh chapter of the Holy Piby to him. Written between 1913 and 1917, and published in 1924 in New Jersey, the Holy Piby was a response to the western Holy Bible, which the author described as of "white origin". To Rogers, the Promised Land for Africans was Ethiopia. Considered "the black man's Bible," the Holy Piby was the first book published by an Anguilla writer in the 20th century.

Although the Holy Piby is one of the foundational texts in Rastafarian theology, it is not strictly speaking a Rastafarian document. Rogers wrote it for the use of an Afrocentric religion he had founded, known as the Afro-Athlican Constructive Gaathly. During that era, Pastor Rogers traveled to numerous cities in the United States, the Caribbean and South America preaching what he called the "law of Ethiopian redemption and liberation". In the city of Kimberley, South Africa, he established one of his religious organizations, which were known as "Afro-Athlican Constructive Gaathly". However, the South African government attacked Rogers' settlement in the region. Parts of Jamaica also halted publication of the Holy Piby. Charles Goodridge, one of the leaders of UNIA on the island, which was then a British colony, was imprisoned for spreading the doctrines of the religious text written by Rogers. Rogers' "Athlican" faith attracted a few followers, mostly in the West Indies, but never grew to the prominence he had envisaged.

=== Death and legacy ===
Pastor Robert Athlyi Rogers committed suicide on 24 August 1931, when he felt that his mission on earth had been completed. But as stated in chapter four of his spiritual manifesto, the Holy Piby, he left behind as a legacy the "salvation" of the Ethiopians.
