= Black history =

Black history refers to:

- History of Africa
- History of the African diaspora, particularly:
  - African-American history, for the United States
  - History of Afro-Arab peoples
  - Afro-Brazilian history
  - History of Black British people
  - History of Black Canadians
  - Afro-Caribbean history
  - History of Afro-Latin Americans

== See also ==
- Black History for Action, a lecture and discussion forum in the UK
- Black History Month, celebrated in February in North America and October in Great Britain
