= Fitz Balintine Pettersburg =

1920s proto-Rastafari Jamaican preacher

Reverend Fitz Balintine Pettersburg was a proto-Rastafari preacher, and author of the Royal Parchment Scroll of Black Supremacy, published in 1926. He influenced Leonard Howell, who according to author Barry Chevannes, plagiarised the Royal Parchment Scroll in his 1935 book The Promise Key.
