= Archibald Dunkley =

Henry Archibald Dunkley was, along with Leonard Howell, Joseph Hibbert, and Robert Hinds, one of the first preachers of the Rastafari movement in Jamaica following the coronation of Ras Tafari as Emperor Haile Selassie I of Ethiopia on 2 November 1930.

Dunkley had spent much time away from Jamaica, as a seaman employed by the United Fruit Company, and he returned to Port Antonio, Jamaica on 8 December 1930, where he switched professions, becoming a street preacher. His studies of the Bible had convinced him that the newly crowned Haile Selassie was the returned Messiah, and that Rastafari was a name of God. By 1933, he had relocated to Kingston, where the King of Kings Ethiopian Mission was founded. Following Howell's December 1933 imprisonment for sedition, Dunkley too was imprisoned briefly by the authorities a number of times in 1934 and 1935 on charges of "disorderly conduct". In August 1938, he became one of the foundation members of the first Jamaican local chapter of the Ethiopian World Federation, Local 17, which however became dormant soon afterwards, to be replaced by the more permanent Local 31.

Although not as much is known of his life as that of Howell (the most outspoken founder of Rastafari), Dunkley was reported as still alive in 1991.
