= Mortimer Planno =

Rastafari elder and drummer (1929–2006)

Mortimo St George Planno (6 September 1929 – 5 March 2006) was a Jamaican Rastafari elder, drummer and a follower of the back-to-Africa movement founded in the 1910s by Marcus Garvey. He is best known as the Rasta teacher and friend of Bob Marley, and as the man who commanded the respect of a chaotic crowd during the arrival of Emperor Haile Selassie on his visit to Jamaica in 1966. He is referred to by other Rastas as a teacher and a leader within the context of the faith, given his life's work.

== Early years ==
He was born in Cuba, the youngest of four children. His mother was Jamaican and she took the family back to Jamaica when Planno was still a young boy in the early 1930s. His father was Cuban and his given name was Mortimo, not Mortimer.

== Rastafari activism ==
He became a prominent Rastafari teacher in Kingston, Jamaica in the 1950s and helped found the Rastafari Movement Association as well as the Local Charter 37 of the Ethiopian World Federation. He also instigated the first "Universal Grounation of the Rastafari", a drumming and chanting ceremony held in the slum of Back-O-Wall in March 1958.

== 1961 visit to Ethiopia ==
After repeated harassment by the authorities and ostracism by the Christian public, Planno and his colleagues approached the University College of the West Indies to request an official study of the Rastafari movement, in an effort to establish a better relationship with the wider Jamaican society. The in-depth study led to Planno and two other prominent Rastas' being sent on a "fact-finding mission" to Ghana, Nigeria, Sierra Leone and other African countries in 1961. During the trip, Planno met Haile Selassie in person in Ethiopia.

The Jamaican government had decided to send a delegation of both officials and Rastafari leaders to Addis Ababa to meet Emperor Haile Selassie. Planno, Douglas Aiken Mack, and Fillmore Alvaranga were the three in the Rasta delegation. Their Minority Report of the mission differs in several significant aspects from that of the non-Rastafarian delegates, e.g.:

- 16 April 1961: "Later in the afternoon the Rases were invited to visit His Holiness Abuna Basilios, the Archbishop of the Ethiopian Orthodox Church at his residence. The other delegates came along too. We discussed H.I.M. Emperor Haile Selassie, being the returned Messiah. His Holiness the Abuna told us at the conclusion of the discussion that the Bible can be interpreted that way. We had tea and honey with him."
- 21 April 1961: "The Mission was granted audience with H.I.M. Emperor Haile Selassie I at the Imperial Palace, Addis-Ababa. We were introduced to H.I.M., by the Minister of the Imperial Guard. Emperor Haile Selassie I welcomed the delegation warmly. Speaking Amharic which was interpreted by the Minister of the Imperial Guard, H.I.M. told us that he knew the black people of the West and particularly Jamaica were blood brothers to the Ethiopians and he knew that slaves were sent from Ethiopia to Jamaica. He said we should send the right people. The Emperor said Ethiopia was large enough to hold all the people of Afrikan descent living outside Afrika and he would send a delegation to the West Indies. Dr. Leslie told H.I.M. that Jamaica had plenty of sugar cane factories making sugar and rum. H.I.M. replied that in Ethiopia there was a refinery making sugar but not rum. H.I.M. thanked the delegation and presented each of us with a gold medal."

"All the rest of the delegation left His presence except the three Rastafarian Brethren (Bros. Fil, Mack, Planno, as we had presents for H.I.M.). Alvaranga presented H.I.M. with a wood-carved map of Afrika with a portrait of the Emperor on one side of the wooden case. The Emperor then spoke in English for the first time to us. He said, "That’s Afrika. Is it from the Rastafari Brethren?” (That showed that he knew us before). We said "Yes". Brother Mack presented photographs of the Rastafari Brethren in Jamaica. H.I.M. said again in English, "Photographs; thank you". Mack also gave H.I.M. a painting of Errol Flynn's island in Jamaica (i.e. Navy Island, off the mainland of Port Antonio). Brother Planno gave H.I.M. a woven scarf in red, gold and green. H.I.M. said "Is it you that wove it". He said "Yes". He said "Thank you again". We also gave H.I.M. a photograph of a widow and six children—her husband, a Rastafari Brethren, was shot and killed by the Police in Jamaica. H.I.M. asked us to who was taking care of them now. We told H.I.M. that we took the case to Jamaica’s Premier but left the island before it was settled. The Emperor said that he would do what he could to help. We then took leave."

The full story of the 1961 Jamaican delegation in Ethiopia is told in Dr. Giulia Bonacci's book Exodus, Heirs and Pioneers, Rastafari Return to Ethiopia (University of the West Indies Press, 2015).

== Bob Marley and the Wailers ==
On 21 April 1966, the Ethiopian Emperor, His Imperial Majesty Haile Selassie I, seen as the Messiah by Rastafarians, landed at Kingston airport for an official visit. Thousands of Rastas smoked ganja in their chalice pipes and surrounded the airplane in adoration after surging past the barriers. Emperor Selassie remained onboard his plane for nearly an hour; some accounts state that the Emperor was struck with fear, while others say he was hiding his tears. It was Mortimo Planno who went up the gangplank and urged Selassie to appear before the ecstatic Rastafarian crowd. Photographs of the Emperor and Planno going down the gangplank appeared in the local press, securing the Rastafarian leader a lasting legendary status. Bob Marley was off the island that day, but fellow Wailers band members Peter Tosh, Bunny Wailer, Rita Marley and Constantine "Vision" Walker were there and actually saw Haile Selassie driving to the city standing on his car.

Bob Marley and other members of the group already knew Planno quite well. The Rastafarian elder lived in the same neighborhood as the vocal group on 35 Fifth Street in West Kingston's Trench Town ghetto, where he kept a library of books on Black Power and Ethiopian history. Planno grew closer to the Wailers throughout 1965. Upon his return from Delaware in late 1966, Marley began an association with him that would last for a couple of years, eventually leading Planno to becoming Marley's manager and producer for a few months. On 8 June 1968, Bob Marley recorded his first openly Rastafarian song, "Selassie is the Chapel", backed by Rastafarian nyabinghi ritual drum ensemble Ras Michael and the Sons of Negus, with Rita Marley and Peter Tosh on harmony vocals. "Selassie is the Chapel" had lyrics adapted by Planno from Sonny Til and the Orioles' 1953 #1 R&B hit song "Crying in the Chapel", which was written by country music singer Artie Glenn (his son Darrell had recorded the original version in 1953) and was also a hit song for Elvis Presley in 1968. The melody was based on the original song, but the nyabinghi arrangement was somewhat different. The recording session at JBC Studio was financed by Planno. He also recorded a Rasta prayer himself, using some Amharic words as well as quoting the Bible. He was also backed by Ras Michael's group, and this recording was issued on the B-side of this rare record as "A Little Prayer". These two rare, vintage tracks were briefly reissued in 2003 by reggae historian Bruno Blum on the Bob Marley four-CD set Rebel (JAD Records).

Planno was later involved in the One Love Peace Concert, an event headlined by Marley in 1978.
