= Joseph Hibbert =

Jamaican Rastafarian preacher (1894–1986)

- Born: Joseph Nathaniel Hibbert; 1894; Jamaica
- Died: 18 September 1986 (aged 91–92)

Joseph Nathaniel Hibbert (1894 – 18 September 1986) was, along with Leonard Howell, Archibald Dunkley, and Robert Hinds, one of the first preachers of the Rastafari movement in Jamaica following the coronation of Ras Tafari as Emperor Haile Selassie I of Ethiopia on 2 November 1930.

Hibbert was born in Jamaica in 1894. In about 1911, at the age of 18, he moved to Costa Rica, where he spent 20 years at farm work, also becoming a member of the Ancient Order of Ethiopia masonic lodge. His background at this time had been with the Ethiopian Baptist Church, founded in Jamaica by the 18th-century Baptist preacher George Lisle.

Hibbert returned to Jamaica in 1931, starting his ministry, "Ethiopian Coptic Faith", to teach that the newly crowned Haile Selassie was divine, in St. Andrew Parish, in a district called Benoah. Hibbert reached this conclusion independently, having studied the Ethiopic translation of the Bible. Somewhat later, he transferred his ministry to Kingston, where he found that another street preacher named Leonard P. Howell was already teaching many similar doctrines. Like Howell and Dunkley, Hibbert was subjected to arrest and imprisonment by the authorities, and he was also a founding member of the Local Charter 37 of the Ethiopian World Federation.

Hibbert was probably among the Rastafari elders, including Mortimer Planno, who were given the honour of meeting with Haile Selassie I on his historic 1966 visit to Jamaica. In 1970, Hibbert formally invited the Archbishop Laike Mandefro, whom Haile Selassie had sent to Jamaica as emissary of the Ethiopian Orthodox Tewahedo Church, to teach Rastafarians about the Orthodox Faith, and in about 1971, Mandefro named Hibbert as a "Spiritual Organizer".
