= Barry Chevannes =

Jamaican anthropologist and academic (1940–2010)

Barry Chevannes OD OJ
- Born: Alston Barrington Chevannes; 7 January 1940; Saint Catherine Parish, Colony of Jamaica, British Empire
- Died: 5 November 2010 (aged 70); Kingston, Jamaica
- Education: St. George's College; Boston College; University of the West Indies; Columbia University
- Occupation: Academic
- Notable work: Rastafari: Roots and Ideology (1994)

Alston Barrington "Barry" Chevannes OD OJ (7 January 1940 – 5 November 2010) was a Jamaican social anthropologist, academic and social activist. He was a leading authority on Caribbean socio-religious movements, most notably the Rastafari, and central figure in Jamaican public life.

== Biography ==
Chevannes was born in the rural parish of Saint Catherine, a third of nine children. In 1953, he travelled to Kingston where he attended St. George's College and it was here that he graduated valedictorian of his class. After his graduation, he felt convicted to serve as a priest leading him to go to the Shadowbrook Jesuit Seminary in Massachusetts, United States. It was during this time that he decided to do a bachelors degree in Philosophy and a masters in Classics with Boston College. In 1966, he made the decision to return to Jamaica where he would teach at a Jesuit school. It would also be around the same period that he would abandon the priesthood in response to both his experiences living as a Black man in the U.S. and the social and economic inequality experienced in his native country. These experiences would compel him to take another masters degree but this time in Sociology with the University of the West Indies. It was during his time as a masters student that he undertook a study on Afro Caribbean culture and religion more especially the Rastafari movement including one of the earliest studies on the social impact of ganja in Jamaica. His research on the Rastafari movement would lead to his receiving a scholarship to do a PhD in Anthropology with Columbia University in the U.S.

== Career ==
Chevannes became attached to the University of West Indies in 1973 around the time he was a masters student. During his tenure at the University of West Indies, he served as Dean of the Faculty of Social Sciences from 1996 to 2004. In addition, he would serve as chair in the National Commission on Ganja and the Institute of Jamaica from 1997 to 2000. As an authority on Rastafari, he published the book Rastafari: Roots and Ideology and served as editor for the book Rastafari and Other African Caribbean Worldviews. Other contributions include Betwixt and Between – Explorations in an African-Caribbean Mindscape and Learning to Be a Man: Culture, Socialization and Gender Identity in Five Caribbean Communities.

== Death ==
Chevannes died on 5 November 2010 in Kingston, Jamaica at the age of 70. He was survived by his wife and two daughters.

== Selected bibliography ==
- Rastafari: Roots and Ideology (1994). Syracuse: Syracuse University Press.
- Rastafari and Other African Caribbean Worldviews (1998). London: Palgrave Macmillan.
