= Leonard Howell =

Jamaican Rastafari preacher (1898–1981)

- Howell c. 1941
- Born: Leonard Percival Howell; 16 June 1898; May Crawle River, Clarendon, Jamaica
- Died: 23 January 1981 (aged 82); Kingston, Jamaica
- Other names: The First Rasta; The Gong; G. G. Maragh (Gangun Guru)
- Known for: Pioneer of the Rastafari movement

Leonard Percival Howell (16 June 1898 – 23 January 1981), also known as The Gong or G. G. Maragh (for Gangun Guru), was a Jamaican religious figure. According to his biographer Hélène Lee, Howell was born into an Anglican family. He was one of the first preachers of the Rastafari movement (along with Joseph Hibbert and Archibald Dunkley), and is known by many as The First Rasta.

Born in May Crawle River on 16 June 1898, Howell left Jamaica as a youth, travelling to many places, including Panama and New York, and returned in 1932. He began preaching in 1933 about what he considered the symbolic portent for the African diaspora—the crowning of Ras Tafari Makonnen as Emperor Haile Selassie I of Ethiopia. His preaching asserted that Haile Selassie was the "Messiah returned to earth", and he published a book called The Promised Key. Although this resulted in his being arrested, tried for sedition, and imprisoned for two years, the Rastafari movement grew.

Over the following years, Howell came into conflict with all the establishment authorities in Jamaica: the planters, the trade unions, established churches, police, and colonial authorities. Howell was seen as a threat largely due to the anti-colonial message of the Rastafarian movement, which he was perpetuating along with the sermons promoting the idea of a positive black racial identity. Local ruling elites were uneasy with Howell’s popular call for black people to take a stand. Colonial authorities hoped to quell Howell’s growing movement early so as to snuff out support early on.

As his following grew, the threat of Howell's core beliefs in the power of black people to overcome white oppression, and his movement, expanded to become an international concern given his strong messages of black liberation and Pan-Africanism that resonated with blacks across the globe. He formed a town or commune called Pinnacle in Saint Catherine Parish that became famous as a place for Rastafari. This movement prospered, and today the Rastafari faith exists worldwide. Unlike many Rastafari, Howell never wore dreadlocks.

Leonard Howell died in Kingston, Jamaica, on 23 January 1981 after suffering a vicious attack months earlier where he was slashed in the face and beaten badly at the age of 83 in Tredegar Park, St. Catherine not far from Pinnacle.

Although Howell suffered much abuse for the foundation of Rastafari, his legacy as a perceived true hero and leader in anti-colonialism took root throughout Jamaica and the Caribbean and eventually globally. Ironically, the same government who sought his continual persecution has in 2022 awarded L.P. Howell or 'Gong' with an Order of Distinction.

== Early life ==
Howell was born on 16 June 1898 in May Crawle village in the Bull Head mountain district of upper Clarendon in Jamaica. He was the eldest of a family of 10 children. Charles Theophilus Howell, his father, worked as peasant cultivator and tailor. Clementina Bennett, his mother, worked as an agricultural labourer.

During the First World War, Howell worked as a seaman and served as part of a Jamaican contingent sent to Panama. Before temporarily settling in Panama in 1918, he travelled back and forth between New York City and Panama several times. While in New York he became a member of Marcus Garvey's Universal Negro Improvement Association (UNIA) after being confronted with his identity as a black man in Harlem for the first time and meeting Garvey, the revolutionary UNIA leader, in person.

Howell lived abroad for a total of some twenty years in his early life, during which time he was arrested and jailed for his involvement with the UNIA because the organization's pro-black messages were viewed as threatening. After migrating to Panama and the United States, he eventually returned home in December 1932 at the age of 34 after being deported from the US. He was deported because of his involvement with the UNIA, which was perceived as threatening by the US government, due to the organization's messages of black power and anti-colonialism. Upon returning to his homeland, he decided to leave his family home and spread the word about Rastafari. This decision to break away from his home was due to a conflict between Howell and his family, presumably because of his controversial belief in the divine nature of Haile Selassie I of Ethiopia.

== Personal life ==
Howell married Tethen Bent, whose grave in Pinnacle is said to have been desecrated. Howell's eldest son is named Monty Howell. Very little information is available about Tethen Bent (who is a descendant of several south St. Elizabeth families, including the Bents, Elliotts, Parchments, Powells, Ebanks, among others), their marriage or other children of Leonard Howell.

== Feud with Alexander Bustamante ==
During the final decades of British colonial rule, Howell’s grassroots movement for Black autonomy faced severe state-sponsored suppression orchestrated by labor leader and future Prime Minister Alexander Bustamante. While Howell championed Black nationalism, spiritual empowerment, and absolute liberation from British rule, Bustamante pursued a pragmatic, creole nationalist strategy that sought to preserve and operate within the existing colonial framework. Viewing Howell's message of self-governance as a direct threat to his own political monopoly over the working class, Bustamante actively weaponized the colonial apparatus to crush the Rastafari movement.

The hostility escalated sharply in 1939 when Bustamante wrote to colonial Governor Sir Arthur Richards, explicitly branding Howell as "the greatest danger today" and demanding his confinement. This political maneuvering effectively integrated the emerging local political elite with British colonial authorities to neutralize Howell. In February 1940, this alliance resulted in a restrictive decree in the Jamaica Gazette banning a Rastafari meeting in Port Morant under the pretext of maintaining "public order."

When Howell established Pinnacle as a thriving, self-sufficient model of economic and spiritual independence, Bustamante used his platform to demonize the community. Between 1941 and 1944, he publicly endorsed aggressive police crackdowns, systematically framing Rastafarian identity as synonymous with lawlessness, sedition, and rebellion.

The campaign to erase Howell's legacy culminated in 1954, when Bustamante personally led a destructive, paramilitary-style raid on Pinnacle. Under his direction, homes were demolished, hundreds of residents were arrested, and decades of Howell's intellectual manuscripts, books, and photographs were intentionally burned in an attempt to obliterate the movement's history. While this assault forced the total collapse of Pinnacle by 1960, it failed to extinguish Howell's influence, as the displaced residents scattered and successfully spread Rastafari beliefs island-wide. The hostile, anti-Rastafarian framework established by Bustamante during this feud set a dangerous precedent for state-sanctioned violence against the community, laying the groundwork for atrocities like the Coral Gardens incident in 1963.

== Rastafari evangelism ==
Howell's first public articulation of the divinity of Haile Selassie occurred in January 1933. This first open deification, which proclaimed the Emperor of Ethiopia to be the incarnation of God, took place at "Redemption Ground" in Kingston but was not successful in gaining converts.

In February 1933, Howell relocated his meeting to a south-eastern parish of St. Thomas and two months later, on 18 April, he addressed about two hundred people at a meeting in Trinity Ville, St. Thomas. During this meeting, police were present to monitor and control the event, which they deemed to be of a "seditious nature". Despite concerns, authorities chose not to press charges against Howell so as not to draw additional attention to his movement and decided instead to closely monitor him.

According to Howell and his followers, Emperor Haile Selassie I of Ethiopia was the "Black Messiah" – an incarnation of God predicted by biblical prophecy. Howell believed that the grand coronation of Haile Selassie (who was widely traditionally claimed to be the descendant of King David, King Solomon, and the Queen of Sheba, in part due to the medieval Ethiopian text Kebra Nagast), was the realization of a prophecy. The grandness of the emperor's ascension to power appeared to validate Howell's imperative claim.

Howell's teachings often began with background information about the people, land, and sovereignty of Ethiopia as an unchanged land populated by original, primitive Christian people who were under direct rule of a king who was a direct descendant of King David. He idealized Ethiopia in his preaching, calling the country a land with unmatched people and a perfect language, the sole uncorrupted language on Earth. Howell emphasized the coming of a new civilization based upon and founded in the glory and power of Haile Selassie, the "Supreme Black King". He instructed his followers to adore the Ethiopian emperor as the supreme God over all of humanity. In Howell's view, it was through Ethiopia that the truths of good character, social order, manhood and womanhood were preserved and were unfolding for all to see. Howell preached that Ethiopian culture was re-emerging to overtake hegemonic Anglo-Saxon forces that had kept Africans enslaved.

== Core values, leadership, and social network ==
Among his followers, Howell preferred being called Gangunguru Maragh or G.G. Maragh to distinguish his ritual, mystical personality from his secular identity. Howell's ritual name is thought to be a combination of three Hindi words – gyan (wisdom), gun (virtue or talent), and guru (teacher). In Hindi, Maragh means "great kings" or "king of kings". Howell used this name as a pseudonym when he published The Promised Key.

During a meeting at Port Mortant, St. Thomas, in September 1933, it is recorded that Howell held a meeting that began with the singing of hymns. Then, Howell reportedly taunted clergymen of other religious denominations at the gathering and discouraged people from attending church because "ministers were liars". He also spoke critically of slavery, claiming that "the White man stole Africa from the Africans, and that Black people should think that Africa is their home, not Jamaica".

Howell's message of praise for Emperor Haile Selassie also came with an open call for black supremacy as a way to combat colonialism and reject oppression by whites. At times, Howell would ask his congregants to join together and sing "God Save the King" – the king being Haile Selassie. Howell's central doctrine acted as a force against white colonial ideology due to his placement of blackness as morally superior to whiteness, as is explained in his widely read publication, The Promised Key.

Howell is remembered as being a charismatic and authoritarian leader who sincerely cared about the wellbeing of his followers. In 1939, Howell founded the Ethiopian Salvation Society (ESS) whose objective was to use collective savings to better its members. A secondary purpose of the ESS was to help spread the good news about salvation and Christianity and underscore the value of self-help and good citizenship. These secondary purposes were expressly stated so as to shield the organization from suspicion that it was promoting sedition. Nevertheless, in 1940 the Jamaican governor responded to pressure from the colonial secretary and the labour leadership by officially banning a meeting of the ESS due to the resentment the organization was creating as well as its internationalization.

In addition to his leadership role in the ESS, Howell served as a role model and father figure for the growing Rastafarian community. His audacious, generous personality, combined with his well-travelled background, made early Rastafarians particularly receptive to his messages. Howell brought "the hope of a new generation, one which was inspired by the magnificence of the new Ethiopian emperor."

To expand Howell's Rastafarian network, he formed relationships with other black groups such as the Afro-Athlican Constructive Gaathly and the UNIA. Additionally he collaborated closely with other icons of the Rastafarian movement such as Marcus Garvey and George Padmore, a Trinidadian journalist.

Howell's appeal for identification with Africa was in opposition to concurrent movements in Jamaica promoting a Jamaican creole nationalism. Howell positioned himself as an opponent of the labour nationalists Bustamante and Manley who had gained a substantial following among the working class. Howell preached to both the working class and the peasantry in Jamaica, attempting to unite disenfranchised black people to overcome colonial oppression. Jamaica's independence in 1962 (which nevertheless maintained social, political and economic ties between Jamaica and Great Britain) was largely a disappointment for Howell, who had called for the complete severance of relations with Britain.

== Trials and punishments ==
In January 1934, Howell and Robert Hinds, another pioneer of the Rastafari movement, were arrested and charged with sedition due to their gatherings and speeches at a meeting of 300 people at Seaforth, St Thomas, on 10 December 1933.

Howell was put on trial for sedition on 13 March 1934, and pleaded not guilty to openly expressing hatred and contempt for the Jamaican government and the King in addition to disturbing public peace on the island. Howell defended himself in court, using a photograph of Haile Selassie as evidence. During this historic trial, Howell is remembered as being the first person to declare that Haile Selassie was "the Messiah returned to earth". Ultimately he was sentenced to two years in jail for sedition by the Jamaican chief justice, Robert William Lyall-Grant.

Later, in 1938, Howell was sent to a mental asylum in Kingston called the Bellevue Asylum after being certified as insane for the inflammatory statements he published in his book The Promised Key. In this publication, which was released while Howell was still incarcerated, he labelled the Roman Catholic Pope as "Satan the Devil" and created the impression that war was being declared against colonialism and white supremacy – which Howell asserted should be replaced with "Black supremacy". Furthermore, he openly objected to locally created religious systems like Revivalism and Obeah, a Jamaican folk practice. Although small, the book was powerful and very popular to the dismay of the Jamaican government.

As one of the most charismatic and outspoken of Rastafarian leaders, Howell was incarcerated at notably higher rates than other pioneers of the Rastafarian movement, such as Joseph Nathaniel Hibbert and Hinds. Described as "the most persecuted Rastafarian to date", Howell suffered considerably under constant state surveillance because of his Rastafarian teachings. Especially threatening to the powers that be was his prophetic call for people to destroy the legitimacy of "international white supremacy", a message that caused people to reconsider their identity, agency and socio-political mobilization in Jamaica and elsewhere.

== Creation of Pinnacle Community ==
Following his release from prison for his teachings and denunciation of colonial rule, Howell created the first Rastafarian village in Jamaica at Sligoville, St. Catherine in 1940. The settlement was called "Pinnacle" due to its high hilltop elevation and was symbolically located in the first free village established to house former slaves in Jamaica. Pinnacle was one of the country’s first self-sustaining communities, its community members were able to meet their needs without dependence on outside resources. Some refer to Pinnacle as a commune, in which Howell's form of socialism was practiced. Soon after its foundation, other similar Rastafarian communities were established across the country. Pinnacle was especially known for the cultivation of ganja (marijuana) that has religious significance for Rastafarians. In efforts to shut down Howell and his followers, police raided Howell’s community of Pinnacle multiple times and labeled the community a "communist experiment" in 1941. Just one year after the creation of the settlement, government forces infiltrated and arrested many of Howell's followers. After escaping immediate arrest, Howell was eventually arrested and tried once again for sedition and consequently was faced with two more years behind bars. Upon his release in 1943, he returned to Pinnacle once again. Howell hired guards and brought in watch dogs to protect Pinnacle from future attacks.

The police raided Pinnacle several more times in the 1950s. In 1954, militia invaded the community and almost completely destroyed the village. Even after this mass destruction, settlers returned, though the settlement was never restored to its previous thriving state. During a final raid in 1958, the police cleared out the remaining residents completely. Despite its ultimate destruction, the impact of the settlement made it legendary among other settlements around the country, who were observed to have been "miniature Pinnacles".

== Alleged disappearance and ongoing legacy ==
Some claim that Howell disappeared from public sight between 1958 and 1960, completely dropping out of his role as a Rastafarian leader. Accounts that he was neither heard from nor interacted with between this period and his death in 1981 have been challenged by historians who examined his life, however. Even after the final major raid of Pinnacle and Howell's confinement in a mental asylum, he reportedly continued in his leadership of the Pinnacle community and as a Rastafari foundational role model, as evidenced by his role as a defendant in several cases at the Home Circuit Court, Kingston, regarding disputes about his ownership of Pinnacle.

Today Howell is remembered as a pioneer of the Rastafarian movement. Additionally, in honour of his values and persistent fight against colonial authority, he is seen as a leader of Pan-Africanism. To fight for his remembrance, the Leonard P. Howell Foundation was created to "perpetuate and honor the memory of Leonard P. Howell"/ The Foundation calls for the restoration of a portion of the Pinnacle Property so that it can become a UNESCO world heritage site, an international Rastafarian worship and research center, and a monument in tribute to the vision and leadership of Leonard Percival Howell.
