= Kofele (district) =

District of Oromia, Ethiopia

Coordinates: 7°10′N 38°50′E

Kofele is one of the Districts in the Oromia Region of Ethiopia. It is named after the administrative center of the District, Kofele. Part of the West Arsi Zone, Kofele is bordered on the south by the Kokosa, on the west by the Southern Nations, Nationalities and Peoples' Region, on the northwest by the Shashamene(District), on the north by Kore, on the east by Gedeb Asasa, and on the south east by Dodola. Other towns in Kofele include Wabe Gefersa.

== Overview ==
The altitude of this woreda ranges from 2000 to 3050 meters above sea level; Mount Duro is the highest point. Rivers include the 35 kilometers of the Anjelo, 30 kilometers of the Totalamo, and 35 kilometers of the Ashoka, all of which are tributaries of the Shebelle River. A survey of the land in this District shows that 30% is arable or cultivable, 29% pasture, 2.9% forest, and the remaining 38.1% is considered swampy, mountainous or otherwise unusable. Vegetables are an important cash crop; hides and skins are the primary export for Kofele.

Industry in the District includes 35 grain mills, one edible oil mill and one wood-working shop employing 103 people, as well as 991 registered businesses which include 162 wholesalers, 253 retailers and 576 service providers. There were 55 Farmers Associations with 21,083 members and 6 Farmers Service Cooperatives with 8466 members. Kofele has 12 kilometers of dry-weather and 65 of all-weather road, for an average of road density of 64.8 kilometers per 1000 square kilometers. About 9.3% of the total population has access to drinking water.

Kofele is the birthplace of famous Ethiopian runner Gelete Burka

== Demographics ==
The 2007 national census reported a total population for this District of 178,950, of whom 89,729 were men and 89,221 were women; 15,448 or 8.63% of its population were urban dwellers. The majority of the inhabitants were Muslim, with 94.32% of the population reporting they observed this belief, while 2.88% of the population said they practiced Ethiopian Orthodox Christianity, and 1.94% of the population were Protestant.

Based on figures published by the Central Statistical Agency in 2005, this District has an estimated total population of 251,761, of whom 126,891 are men and 124,870 are women; 20,874 or 8.29% of its population are urban dwellers, which is less than the Zone average of 12.3%. With an estimated area of 1,187.66 square kilometers, Kofele has an estimated population density of 212 people per square kilometer, which is greater than the Zone average of 132.2.

The 1994 national census reported a total population for this District of 179,708, of whom 89,443 were men and 90,265 women; 11,665 or 6.49% of its population were urban dwellers at the time. The two largest ethnic groups reported in Kofele were the Oromo (94.86%), and the Amhara (3.83%); all other ethnic groups made up 1.31% of the population. Oromo was spoken as a first language by 94.59%, and 4.55% spoke Amharic; the remaining 0.86% spoke all other primary languages reported. The majority of the inhabitants were Muslim, with 55.63% of the population having reported they practiced that belief, while 44.01% of the population said they professed Ethiopian Orthodox Christianity.
