= Jamaicans =

People of Jamaica

Jumiekans (Jamaican Patois)
- Flag of Jamaica

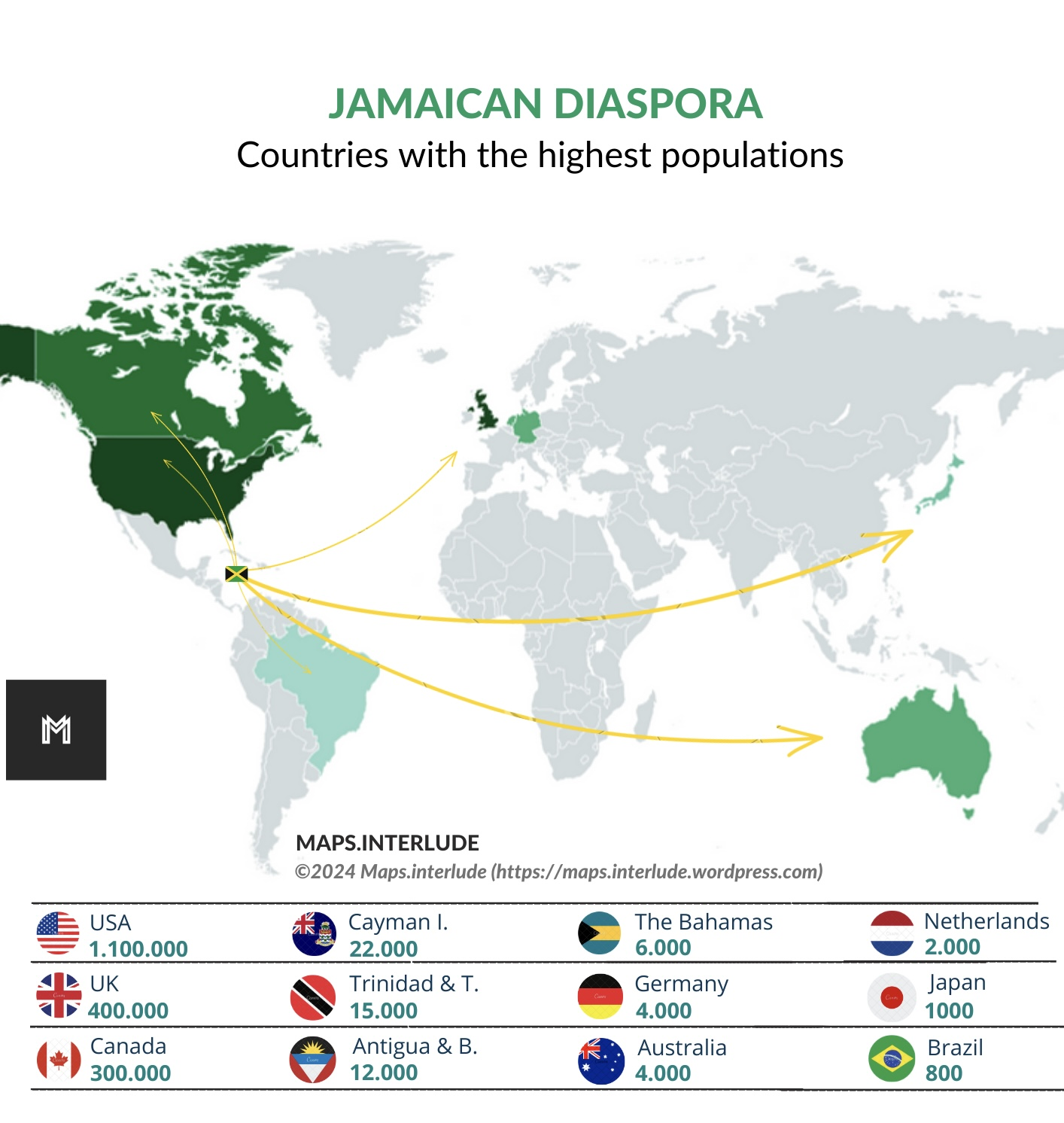

Total population
- c. 4.4 million 2,683,707 (2011 census)

Regions with significant populations
- Jamaica 2,827,695
- United States: 1,100,000+
- United Kingdom: 800,000+
- Canada: 309,485
- Cayman Islands: 23,095
- Trinidad and Tobago: 15,000
- Antigua and Barbuda: 12,000
- The Bahamas: 5,572
- Germany: 4,000
- The Netherlands: 1,971
- Australia: 1,092
- France: 1,000
- Japan: 945
- Brazil: 769
- New Zealand: 690
- Aruba: 542

Languages
- Jamaican English, Jamaican Patois

Religion
- Primarily Protestantism, Rastafari

Related ethnic groups
- Caribbean people

Jamaicans are the citizens of Jamaica and their descendants in the Jamaican diaspora. The vast majority of Jamaicans are of Sub-Saharan African descent, with minorities of Europeans, Indians, Chinese, Middle Eastern, and others of mixed ancestry. The bulk of the Jamaican diaspora resides in other Anglophone countries, namely Canada, the United States and the United Kingdom. Jamaican populations are also prominent in other Caribbean countries, territories and Commonwealth realms, where in the Cayman Islands, born Jamaicans, as well as Caymanians of Jamaican origin, make up 26.8% of the population. Outside of Anglophone countries, the largest Jamaican diaspora community lives in Central America, where Jamaicans make up a significant percentage of the population.

== History ==
The initial inhabitants were Indigenous peoples, including the Taíno. The Taíno migrated from Venezuela and referred to Jamaica as Xaymaca, which translates to "land of wood and water" in the Taíno language. Upon the arrival of Christopher Columbus, the Spaniards killed many Taíno in order to get their land. The native Tainos were greatly reduced in number due to European diseases and the compulsory labor enforced by the Spanish, although some Tainos managed to survived during English colonization.

According to the official Jamaica Population Census of 1970, ethnic origins categories in Jamaica include: Black (Mixed); Chinese; East Indian; White; and 'Other' (e.g.: Syrian or Lebanese). Jamaicans who consider themselves Black (according to the United States' One-drop rule definition of Black), made up 92% of the working population. Those of non-African descent or mixed race made up the remaining 8% of the population.

But according to a more precise study conducted by the local University of the West Indies - Jamaica's population is more accurately 76.3% African descent or Black, 15.1% Afro-European (or locally called the Brown Man or Browning Class), 3.4% East Indian and Afro-East Indian, 3.2% Caucasian, 1.2% Chinese and 0.8% Other.

Wealth or economic power in Jamaica is disproportionately held by the White Jamaicans, Chinese Jamaicans and the Afro-European (or locally called the Brown Man or Browning Class) - i.e. despite being a minority group(s) (less than 25% of the country's population) controls most of the country's wealth.

According to Minority Rights Group International, approximately 3,000 Yamaye Taíno people live in Jamaica and that some Jamaican Maroon communities assert Indigenous ancestry.

== Self-identified ethnic origin ==
Responses of the 2011 official census.

Ethnic origin	Population	Males	Females	Percentage
Black	2,471,946	1,226,026	1,245,920	92.1
Chinese	5,228	2,880	2,348	0.2
Mixed	162,718	73,293	89,425	6.0
East Indian	20,066	10,491	9,575	0.7
White	4,365	2,192	2,173	0.2
Other	1,898	970	928	0.1
Not Reported	17,486	8,638	8,848	0.6
Total	2,683,707	1,324,490	1,359,217	100.0%

A more precise breakdown of the Responses of the 2011 official census by the University of the West Indies

Ethnic origin	Population	Percentage
Black	2,047,668	76.3
Chinese	32,224	1.2
Afro-European or Browning Class	405,240	15.1
East Indian and Afro-East Indian	91,246	3.4
White	85,878	3.2
Other	21,470	0.8
Total	2,683,707	100.0%

== Religion ==
Denomination	2011 census	
Denomination	Number	Percentage
Christian		
Anglicanism	74,891	
Baptists	180,640	
Brethren	23,647	
Baptists	20,872	-
Brethren	9,758	1.0
Church of God in Jamaica	129,544	-
Church of God of Prophecy	121,400	-
New Testament Church of God	192,086	-
Other Church of God	246,838	-
The Church of Jesus Christ of Latter-Day Saints (2021)	6,718	-
Jehovah's Witnesses	50,849	2.0
Methodist	43,336	2.0
Moravian	18,351	
Pentecostal	295,195	
Rastafari	29,026	
Revivalist	36,296	
Roman Catholic	57,946	
Seventh-day Adventist	322,228	-
United Church	56,360	
Baháʼí	269	
Hinduism	1,836	-
Islam	1,513	-
Judaism	506	
Other Religion/Denomination	169,014	-
Totals, specified religions		100.00
No Religion/Denomination	572,008	-
Not reported	60,326	-
Totals, Jamaica	2,683,105	100.00

== Diaspora ==
Many Jamaicans now live overseas and outside Jamaica, while many have migrated to Anglophone countries, including over 800,000 Jamaicans in the United Kingdom, over 300,000 in Canada and 1,100,000 in the United States. Jamaicans also make up a large portion of the population in the neighboring Cayman Islands at almost 27% of the population; with most residing in the Cayman Islands on work permits.

There are about 30,500 Jamaicans residing in other CARICOM member including the Bahamas, Antigua & Barbuda (12,000), Barbados and Trinidad & Tobago. There are also communities of Jamaican descendants in Central America, particularly Costa Rica, Nicaragua, and Panama. Most of Costa Rica's Afro-Costa Rican and Mulatto population, which combined represents about 7% of the total population, is of Jamaican descent.

== See also ==
- Afro-Nicaraguan
- Afro-Panamanian
- Demographics of Jamaica
- Immigration to Jamaica
- Jamaicans in Ethiopia
