= Negele Arsi =

Town in Oromia Region, Ethiopia

Negele Arsi Nageellee Arsii (Oromo)
- Town
- Location within Ethiopia
- Coordinates: 7°21′N 38°42′E
- Country: Ethiopia
- Region: Oromia
- Zone: West Arsi
- Woreda: Arsi Negele
- Elevation: 2,043 m (6,703 ft)

Population (2005)
  - Total: 42,054
- Time zone: UTC+3 (EAT)

Negele Arsi or Arsi Negele, is a city in southeastern Ethiopia. Located in the West Arsi Zone of the Oromia Region on the paved highway north of Shashamane, this town has a longitude and latitude of 7°21′N 38°42′E and an elevation of 2,043 meters above sea level. It is the administrative center of Arsi Negele District.

== History ==
Negele Arsi has had electrical power since the 1950s, as well as telephone and postal service by 1967. The town's economic catchment extends beyond the woreda, attracting peasants from Shashamene woreda who trade cereal and potatoes for cattle and seeds at the weekly market, which is held each Monday.

Prince Sahle Selassie was a very substantial landowner around Negele Arsi. By the early 1970s, half of Arsi Negele District was owned by his descendants. The town was used as a mobilization point for units of the regular army during 1971, whence they responded to the disorders that followed evictions when landowners mechanised farms.

Based on figures from the Central Statistical Agency in 2005, Negele Arsi has an estimated total population of 42,054, of whom 21,120 are men and 20,934 are women. According to the 1994 national census, the town had a population of 23,512, of whom 11,425 were men and 12,058 were women.

== Note ==
There are at least three other smaller towns named Negele in Arsi and West Arsi zones:

- Negelle Sigalo, a town in Gedeb Asasa district
- Negelle Metema, a town in Dodola district
- Negelle 01, a town in Guna district
