= Arsi =

Arsi may refer to:

== Places ==
- Arsi Province, a former province of Ethiopia
- Arsi Zone, a zone within the Oromia region of Ethiopia
- West Arsi Zone, a zone within the Oromia region of Ethiopia
  - Arsi Oromo, an Ethiopian clan of the Oromo people
  - Loqoda Arsi, a dialect of Oromo language
- Arsi Mountains National Park in Arsi Zone
- Arsi Negele, a woreda in Oromia Region, Ethiopia
- Negele Arsi, a city in southeastern Ethiopia

== Entertainment ==
- Hello Arsi, a 2018 Indian Odia romantic drama film
- ARSI – Amateur Radio Society of India

== Other uses ==
- Arsi (given name)
- Ārśi, the original name, in the Tocharian languages for the city of Agni (Chinese Yanqi), later Karasahr as well as the surrounding area and its inhabitants
