= Seraro =

District in Oromia Region, Ethiopia

Coordinates: 7°20′N 38°20′E

Seraro is one of the woredas in the Oromia Region of Ethiopia. Part of the West Arsi Zone located in the Great Rift Valley, Seraro is bordered on the south and west by the Southern Nations, Nationalities and Peoples' Region, on the north by Shala, and on the east by Naannawa Shashamane; its western boundary is defined by the course of the Bilate River. The administrative center of this woreda is Loke.

== Overview ==
The altitude of this woreda ranges from 1500 to 2300 meters above sea level. Bodies of water include Lake Chitu. A survey of the land in this woreda shows that 51.8% is arable or cultivable, 1.8% pasture, 4.7% forest, and the remaining 41.6% is considered swampy, degraded or otherwise unusable. Haricot beans are an important cash crop. The Senkelle Swayne's Hartebeest Sanctuary covers 58 square kilometers of this woreda. Although Coffee is also an important cash crop of this woreda, less than 20 square kilometers is planted with this crop.

Industry in the woreda includes 7 small food-related industries employing 20 people, as well as 527 registered businesses including 227 wholesalers 218 retailers and 82 service providers. There were 59 Farmers Associations with 20,120 members and 9 Farmers Service Cooperatives with 10,060 members. Seraro has 74 kilometers of dry-weather and 37 all-weather road, for an average road density of 75.7 kilometers per 1000 square kilometers. About 6% of the total population has access to drinking water.

There was a report that rapid deployment forces of the federal and regional police killed two members of the Southern Ethiopia Peoples' Democratic Coalition (SEPDC) during a January 2000 meeting organized by the Council of Alternative Forces for Peace and Democracy in Ethiopia in Seraro. Although authorities detained 13 SEPDC members, no action had been taken against the police officers involved by year's end. This was one of many events leading to the 2000 general election.

== Demographics ==
The 2007 national census reported a total population for this woreda of 145,649, of whom 71,641 were men and 74,008 were women; 5,172 or 3.55% of its population were urban dwellers. The majority of the inhabitants were Muslim, with 86.53% of the population reporting they observed this belief, while 8.83% of the population said they were Protestant, 2.25% of the population practiced Ethiopian Orthodox Christianity, and 2.24% were Catholic.

Based on figures published by the Central Statistical Agency in 2005, this woreda has an estimated total population of 249,414, of whom 127,194 are men and 122,220 are women; 9,134 or 3.66% of its population are urban dwellers, which is less than the Zone average of 32.1%. With an estimated area of 1,467.03 square kilometers, Seraro has an estimated population density of 170 people per square kilometer, which is less than the Zone average of 181.7.

The 1994 national census reported a total population for this woreda of 179,979, of whom 88,674 were men and 91,305 women; 5,110 or 2.84% of its population were urban dwellers at the time. The five largest ethnic groups reported in Seraro were the Oromo (80.04%), the Alaba (4.05%), the Kambaata (3.01%), the Welayta (2.82%), and the Amhara (1.01%); all other ethnic groups made up 9.07% of the population. Oromo was spoken as a first language by 78.99%, 8.3% spoke Hadiya, 4.89% spoke Alaba, 2.74% spoke Kambaata, and 2.35% spoke Amharic; the remaining 2.73% spoke all other primary languages reported. The majority of the inhabitants were Moslem, with 90.93% of the population reporting they practiced that belief, while 4.51% of the population said they were Ethiopian Orthodox Christianity, and 2.89% were Protestant.
