= Adaba (Aanaa) =

District in Oromia of Ethiopia

Coordinates: 7°00′20″N 39°23′30″E

Adaba (Oromo: Aadabbaa) is one of the Aanaas in the Oromia of Ethiopia; it shares the name of its administrative center, Adaba. Part of the West Arsi Zone, Adaba is bordered on the southwest by Nensebo, on the west by Dodola, on the northwest by the Shabelle River which separates it from the Gedeb Asasa, and on the east and south by Bale Zone.

Ulrich Braukämper theorizes that the name "Adaba" comes from a Hadiya subgroup mentioned in the Royal Chronicle of Zara Yaqob, where they are referred to as the "Hababo". Braukämper has argued that the Hadiya kingdom prior to the 16th century included in this area, presenting a number of facts supporting his argument, as opposed to other experts who argue that it extended to the east.

== Overview ==
The highest point in this woreda is Mount Darkeena; other notable peaks include Mount Doda and Mount Gamma; most rivers are tributaries of the Shabelle River and include the Meribo, Ieliso, Furuna, Ashiro and Mancha Kara. A survey of the land in this woreda shows that 16.9% is arable or cultivable, 23.3% pasture, 52.2% forest, and the remaining 7.6% is considered swampy, mountainous or otherwise unusable. Notable landmarks include Bale Mountains National Park. Linseed, sugar cane, cereals and fruits and vegetables are important cash crops.

Industry in the woreda includes 39 grain mills, 12 edible oil mills and 5 wood-working shops, as well as 91 wholesalers, 271 retailers and 153 service providers. There were 19 Farmers Associations with 43,154 members and 5 Farmers Service Cooperatives with 3454 members. Adaba has 6 kilometers of dry-weather and 91 all-weather road, for an average of road density of 42 kilometers per 1000 square kilometers.

== Demographics ==
The 2007 national census reported a total population for this woreda of 138,717, of whom 68,775 were men and 69,942 were women; 12,099 or 8.72% of its population were urban dwellers. The majority of the inhabitants were Muslim, with 84.39% of the population reporting they observed this belief, while 14.46% of the population said they practiced Ethiopian Orthodox Christianity.

Based on figures published by the Central Statistical Agency in 2005, this woreda has an estimated total population of 138,232, of whom 70,638 were males and 67,594 were females; 17,875 or 12.93% of its population are urban dwellers, which is less than the Zone average of 13.5%. With an estimated area of 2,166.41 square kilometers, Adaba has an estimated population density of 63.8 people per square kilometer, which is greater than the Zone average of 27.

The 1994 national census reported a total population for this woreda of 97,586, of whom 47,820 were men and 49,766 women; 9,997 or 10.24% of its population were urban dwellers at the time. The two largest ethnic groups reported in Adaba were the Oromo (93%), and the Amhara (5.49%); all other ethnic groups made up 1.51% of the population. oromo was spoken as a first language by 91.88%, and 7.49% spoke Amharic; the remaining 0.63% spoke all other primary languages reported. The majority of the inhabitants were Muslim, with 79.97% of the population having reported they practiced that belief, while 19.26% of the population said they professed Ethiopian Orthodox Christianity.

== Climate ==
Climate data for Adaba, elevation 2,485 m (8,153 ft), (1971–2000)
Month	Jan	Feb	Mar	Apr	May	Jun	Jul	Aug	Sep	Oct	Nov	Dec	Year
Mean daily maximum °C (°F)	24.4 (75.9)	24.7 (76.5)	25.1 (77.2)	23.6 (74.5)	24.8 (76.6)	25.0 (77.0)	21.3 (70.3)	21.2 (70.2)	22.1 (71.8)	22.2 (72.0)	22.4 (72.3)	23.6 (74.5)	23.4 (74.1)
Mean daily minimum °C (°F)	4.6 (40.3)	5.4 (41.7)	6.7 (44.1)	7.8 (46.0)	7.4 (45.3)	7.5 (45.5)	8.7 (47.7)	8.2 (46.8)	6.7 (44.1)	5.9 (42.6)	3.9 (39.0)	3.7 (38.7)	6.4 (43.5)
Average precipitation mm (inches)	27.0 (1.06)	39.0 (1.54)	56.0 (2.20)	75.0 (2.95)	64.0 (2.52)	72.0 (2.83)	169.0 (6.65)	190.0 (7.48)	82.0 (3.23)	26.0 (1.02)	5.0 (0.20)	6.0 (0.24)	811 (31.92)
Average relative humidity (%)	62	62	64	69	66	67	74	78	76	71	65	60	68
Source: FAO
