= Noel Dyer =

Jamaican Rastafarian elder

Bongo Papa Noel Dyer I (c. 1927 – 31 July 2000) was a Jamaican Rastafarian elder known within the movement as the man who "walked to Ethiopia" after hitchhiking there, becoming in 1965 one of the first Rastas to settle on the Shashamane land granted in 1948 by the Rastafarian messiah, and Emperor of Ethiopia, Haile Selassie I. His story is featured prominently in The Emperor's Birthday, the 1993 documentary by John Dollar.

By Papa Dyer's own account, he was converted to Rastafari after seeing Mortimer Planno speak in 1959. Like many young Jamaicans at the time, Dyer made his way to England in 1961 (aboard a Spanish ship), but unlike those who had preceded him, his intention was not to remain there, but to travel on to Africa, namely the free land at Shashamane that had been promised to West Indians by Emperor Haile Selassie I in 1948. He stayed for about three years in England, before deciding that he had had enough of the 'belly of the beast'.

In 1964, he decided to leave 'Babylon' for his spiritual homeland, Ethiopia, with only five pounds, five shillings and five-and-a-half pence in his pocket. It took him around 1 year to reach his destination.

He did not literally "walk", but hitch-hiked through France, Spain, Morocco, Algeria, Tunisia, Libya, Egypt and Sudan, before arriving in Addis Ababa in September 1965. At Addis, Dyer was granted an audience with Emperor Haile Selassie I at his Jubilee Palace. There, he says the Emperor personally told him, "Be at home in the Jubilee Palace. Make yourself at home, like when it was in Jamaica. Everything will be all right." The following day, he made his way to Shashamane with all the documents needed for residence and a position with the Imperial Highway Authority. He was preceded there by only one other Rastafari elder, brother Gladstone Robinson of the Ethiopian World Federation (EWF), who had flown to Ethiopia in June, 1964.
