= Kore (Aanaa) =

District in Oromia Region, Ethiopia

Kore is one of the woredas in the Oromia of Ethiopia. It is named after the administrative center of the woreda, Kore. It was part of Kofele woreda. Part of the West Arsi Zone, Kore is bordered on the south by the Kofele, on the southwest by the Naannawa Shashamane, on the northwest by Arsi Negele, on the north by Arsi Zone, and on the east by Gedeb Asasa.

== Demographics ==
The 2007 national census reported a total population for this woreda of 103,734, of whom 51,538 were men and 52,196 were women; 5,393 or 5.2% of its population were urban dwellers. The majority of the inhabitants were Muslim, with 89.37% of the population reporting they observed this belief, while 8.85% of the population said they practiced Ethiopian Orthodox Christianity, and 1.21% of the population were Catholic.
