= Nensebo (Aanaa) =

Administrative division in Oromia, Ethiopia

Coordinates: 6°35′N 39°10′E

Nensebo is one of the Aanaas in the Oromia of Ethiopia. Part of the West Arsi Zone, Nensebo is bordered on the south by the Borena Zone, on the west by the Southern Nations, Nationalities and Peoples Region, on the northwest by Kokosa, on the north by Dodola, on the northeast by Adaba, on the east by Bale Zone. Towns in Nensebo include Werka.

== Overview ==
Hills and mountain ranges characterize 70% of this woreda; the rest consists of arid lands and plateaus. Perennial rivers include the Hodem, Kuke, Bedesa, Aebamo and Bohera. A survey of the land in this woreda shows that 22% is arable or cultivable (11% was in annual crops), 18.5% pasture, 58% forest and shrubland, and the remaining 1.5% is considered swampy, degraded or otherwise unusable. Teff, wheat and ensete are important local crops. Coffee is an important cash crop; over 5,000 hectares are planted with it.

Industry in the woreda includes a few small scale industry as well as some retailers and service providers. Deposits of graphite, nickel, beryllium and marble are present in this woreda, but have not been commercially developed. There were 12 Farmers Associations with 6,243 members and 10 Farmers Service Cooperatives with 1,367 members. Nensebo has 40 kilometers of rural road, for an average road density of 23.7 kilometers per 1000 square kilometers. About 4.6% of the total population has access to drinking water.

== Demographics ==
The 2007 national census reported a total population for this woreda of 114,559, of whom 56,976 were men and 57,583 were women; 6,068 or 5.3% of its population were urban dwellers. The majority of the inhabitants were Muslim, with 62.91% of the population reporting they observed this belief, while 24.14% of the population said they were Protestant, 8.77% of the population practiced Ethiopian Orthodox Christianity, 2.22% were Catholic, and 1.77% practiced traditional beliefs.

Based on figures published by the Central Statistical Agency in 2005, this woreda has an estimated total population of 67,254, of whom 33,902 were males and 33,352 were females; 5,473 or 8.14% of its population are urban dwellers, which is less than the Zone average of 13.5%. With an estimated area of 1,689.69 square kilometers, Nensebo has an estimated population density of 39.8 people per square kilometer, which is greater than the Zone average of 27.

The 1994 national census reported a total population for this woreda of 48,024, of whom 23,902 were men and 24,122 women; 3,059 or 6.37% of its population were urban dwellers at the time. The three largest ethnic groups reported in Nensebo were the Oromo (77.45%), the Sidama (12.7%), and the Amhara (9.3%); all other ethnic groups made up 0.55% of the population. Oromiffa was spoken as a first language by 76.6%, 12.87% spoke Sidamo, and 10.38% spoke Amharic; the remaining 0.63% spoke all other primary languages reported. The majority of the inhabitants were Muslim, with 64.19% of the population having reported they practiced that belief, while 13.48% of the population said they professed Ethiopian Orthodox Christianity, and 12.84% were Protestant.
