= Naannawa Shashamane (woreda) =

District in Oromia Region, Ethiopia

Coordinates: 7°15′N 38°40′E

Naannawa Shashamane is a woreda in Oromia Region, Ethiopia. It is named after the town of Shashamene what was separated from this woreda. Part of the West Arsi Zone located in the Great Rift Valley, Shashamene is bordered on the south by the Southern Nations, Nationalities and Peoples Region, on the west by Shala, on the north by Arsi Negele, on the east by the Kore, and on the southeast by Kofele. The largest town in Shashamene is Kuyera.

== Overview ==
Except for the eastern portion, the altitude of this woreda ranges from 1500 to 2300 meters above sea level; Mount Abaro is the highest point. Rivers include the Dedeba Tina, Melka Oda and Laftu; small parts of Lakes Awasa and Chelaka lie in Shashamene. A survey of the land in this woreda shows that 65% is arable or cultivable, 15% pasture, 2.4% forest, and the remaining 16.6% is considered swampy, degraded or otherwise unusable. The main crops produced for consumption and cash were potatoes, corn, wheat, barley and teff. In 1996, horse beans and peas were commonly grown, but by 2005 cultivation has mostly stopped because of theft; this has forced the locals to buy peas to prepare shiro, a common dish. Another crop no longer grown is finger millet (known as dagusa), because it takes a long time to cultivate and it demands labor year-around. Although Coffee is also an important cash crop of this woreda, less than 20 square kilometers are planted with this crop.

Industry in the woreda includes one saw mill owned by the government, 76 small industries employing 249 people, 384 wholesalers 979 retailers and 630 service providers. There were 36 Farmers Associations with 21,545 members and 8 Farmers Service Cooperatives with 13,762 members. Shashamene has 40 kilometers of dry-weather and 91 all-weather road, for an average road density of 172 kilometers per 1000 square kilometers. About 9% of the rural, 100% of the urban and 33% of the total population has access to drinking water.

== History ==
The oral history of the inhabitants of this woreda begins with a severe famine around 1850, known as Rukisa (Arsi Oromiffa "hunger"), when the cattle developed diarrhea and "the Oromo in the area ate horse and donkey meat as a result of famine." At that time the inhabitants were primarily pastoralists. Around 1935, the gebbar system was imposed by the naftagna and balabat landowners, which led to 95% of the farmers becoming tenants. Then in 1945, new crops were introduced to local farmers, which included finger millet, teff, wheat and coffee. Local elders remember "Shenqute's Famine" in 1957, locally known as Rukissa Qallo (the thin famine), when they were still pastoralists; these elders also recalled the shocks of the earthquake at Karakore in 1961. By the time of the far more severe 1984 famine, the inhabitants had shifted to a primarily agricultural lifestyle, but due to lack of rain they suffered from a shortage of food. They lost most of their cattle during the drought due to lack of pasture and water in the fields, but did not receive relief during that famine. They were able to survive the famine only because of the resumption of rains which began on 17 May 1984.

In 1991, following the flight of President Mengistu Haile Mariam from Ethiopia, Oromo living in Turufe Kecheme kebele drove out non-Oromo settlers in the kebele for their land. This was primarily aimed at Kambaata settlers, but Amharas were also victims of the violence. The Tigrayan settlers resisted at the time because they were armed.

== Demographics ==
The 2007 national census reported a total population for this woreda of 246,774, of whom 123,057 were men and 123,717 were women; 10,193 or 4.13% of its population were urban dwellers. The majority of the inhabitants were Muslim, with 86.53% of the population reporting they observed this belief, while 6.3% of the population said they were Protestant, and 6.04% of the population practiced Ethiopian Orthodox Christianity.

Based on figures published by the Central Statistical Agency in 2005, this woreda has an estimated total population of 339,981, of whom 171,161 were males and 168,820 were females; 105,929 or 31.16% of its population are urban dwellers, which is less than the Zone average of 32.1%. With an estimated area of 759.53 square kilometers, Shashamene has an estimated population density of 447.6 people per square kilometer, which is greater than the Zone average of 181.7. It is the most densely populated woreda in the Misraq Shewa Zone.

The 1994 national census reported a total population for this woreda of 229,562, of whom 113,510 were men and 116,052 women; 59,219 or 25.80% of its population were urban dwellers at the time. The five largest ethnic groups reported in Shashamene were the Oromo (74.11%), the Amhara (9.26%), the Welayta (5%), the Kambaata (2.3%), and the Soddo Gurage (2.13%); all other ethnic groups made up 7.2% of the population. The predominant clan of the Oromo people in this woreda are the Arsi Oromo. Oromiffa was spoken as a first language by 71.7%, 18.23% spoke Amharic, 3.49% Welayta, 1.52% Kambaata, and 1.14% spoke Sebat Bet Gurage; the remaining 2.02% spoke all other primary languages reported. The majority of the inhabitants were Moslem, with 69.38% of the population reporting they practiced that belief, while 23.51% of the population said they were Ethiopian Orthodox Christianity, 5.62% were Protestant, and 1.05% were Roman Catholic.
