= Shala (Aanaa) =

Administrative division of Ethiopia

Shala is one of the Aanaas in the Oromia of Ethiopia. It was separated from Seraro woreda. Part of the West Arsi Zone located in the Great Rift Valley, Shala is bordered on the south by Seraro, on the west by the Southern Nations, Nationalities and Peoples' Region, on the north by Shala Lake which separates it from Arsi Negele, and on the east by Naannawa Shashamane; its western boundary is defined by the course of the Bilate River. The administrative center of this woreda is Aje.

== Demographics ==
The 2007 national census reported a total population for this woreda of 149,804, of whom 74,930 were men and 74,874 were women; 7,680 or 5.13% of its population were urban dwellers. The majority of the inhabitants were Muslim, with 94.81% of the population reporting they observed this belief, while 2.5% of the population said they were Protestant, and 2.12% of the population practiced Ethiopian Orthodox Christianity.
