= Jamaicans in Ethiopia =

Jamaicans expatriates and emigrant in Ethiopia

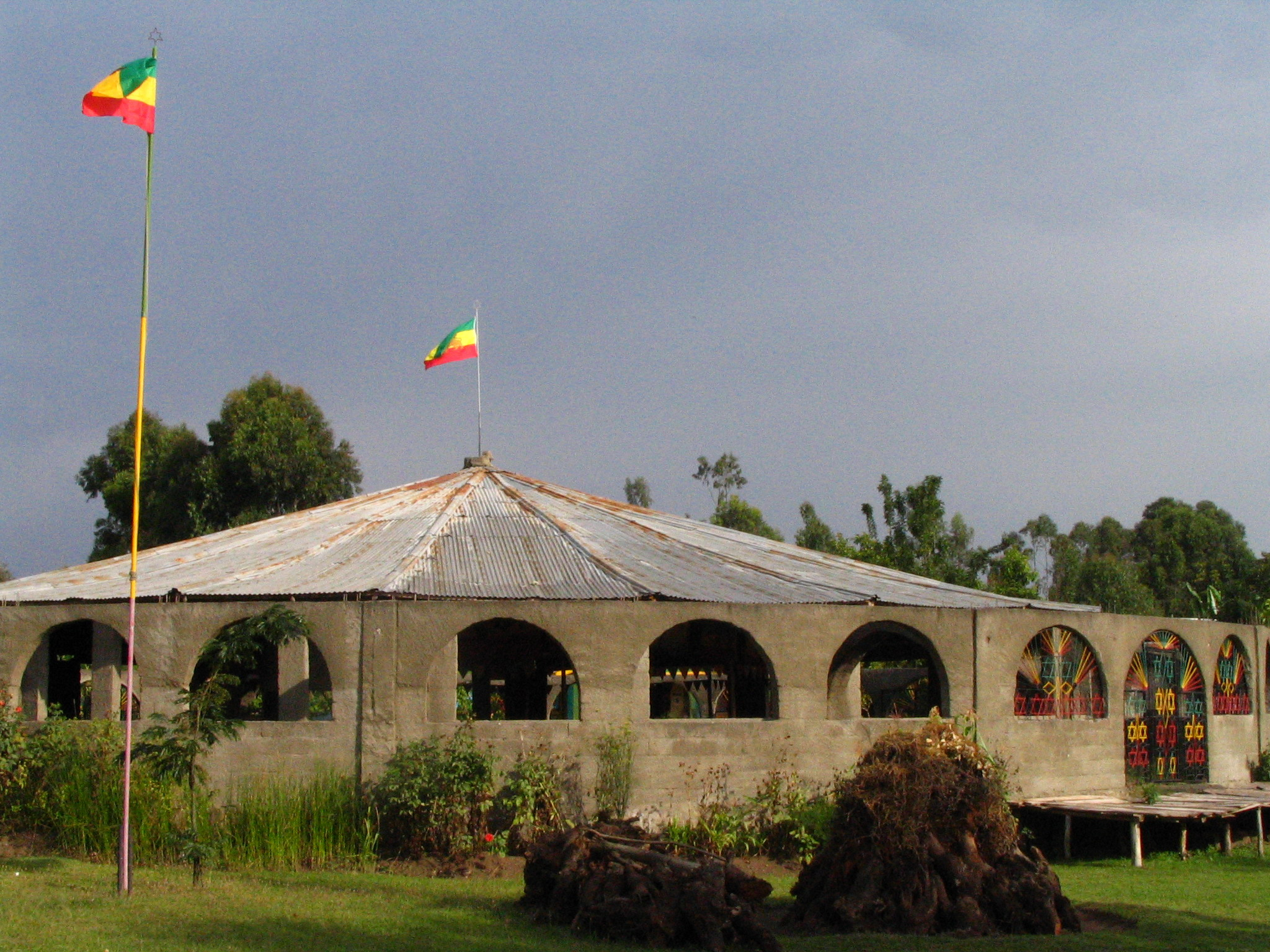
- Jamaican Rastas in Ethiopia

Total population
- 1000+

Regions with significant populations
- Shashamane * Addis Ababa

Languages
- Amharic, and other Languages of Ethiopia, Jamaican English, Jamaican Patois.

Religion
- Rastafari · Ethiopian Orthodox Tewahedo

Related ethnic groups
- Jamaican diaspora

Jamaican Ethiopians comprise Jamaican emigrants and expatriates residing in Ethiopia.

== Migration history ==
The settlement in Shashamane traces its roots to the 1948 Shashamane Land Grant by Emperor Haile Selassie I to members of the Ethiopian World Federation in gratitude for their defence of Ethiopia during the Second Italo-Ethiopian War. Most of the initial settlers who took advantage of this offer were African American, but Jamaicans began coming in the 1960s. They quickly came to form a notable presence in the Shashamane settlement, earning it the nickname "Little Jamaica".

By 2001, roughly 200 families of Rastafarians lived at Shashamane. However, a 2011 fact-finding mission by Steven Golding of the Universal Negro Improvement Association's Kingston branch discovered that there has been ongoing confusion over land title among later migrants, particularly because Ethiopian policy no longer permits the alienation of land to foreign citizens. Furthermore, as Ethiopian nationality law does not incorporate the concept of jus soli, the children of Jamaicans living in Ethiopia are not citizens of the country and cannot access certain public services reserved for citizens. The Jamaican diaspora in Ethiopia have pressed the Jamaican government to establish an embassy in Addis Ababa in order to represent their concerns more effectively to the Ethiopian government; as of 2010, Jamaica was represented in Ethiopia solely by an honorary consul. In 2017, the Rastafarian community were granted identification cards and resident status by the government, although officials were quick to stress that this action did not amount to granting them citizenship.

== See also ==
- Rastafari movement
