= Malaku E. Bayen =

Ethiopian activist

- Born: April 29, 1900; Wollo Province, Ethiopia
- Died: May 4, 1940 (aged 40); Rockland State Hospital, Orangeburg, New York, U.S.
- Education: Muskigum University, Howard University School of Medicine
- Known for: Pan-Africanism, Ethiopian World Federation
- Spouse: Dorothy Hadley
- Children: Malaku Bayen Jr.

Malaku Emmanuel Bayen (April 29, 1900 – May 4, 1940) was an Ethiopian activist, best known for founding the Ethiopian World Federation (EWF), together with his uncle Haile Selassie, the Emperor of Ethiopia. During the Second Italo-Ethiopian War in 1935, he became the Emperor's personal physician, working as a doctor for the Ethiopian army. Following the invasion of Addis Ababa, Bayen fled with Emperor Selassie and eventually traveled to the United States to serve as Selassie's personal envoy. Until his early death in 1940, Bayen devoted himself to the cause of Ethiopian liberation and Black unity.

== Early life ==
Malaku Emmanuel Bayen was born on April 29, 1900, in Wollo Province, in central Ethiopia. He grew up in Harar, in the palace of Tafari Makonnen, the future emperor of Ethiopia and his mother's first cousin. Coming from an aristocratic family, Bayen was educated by priests, under the tutelage of Ras (Grand Duke) Tafari. At the age of 21, Bayen was selected by Ras Tafari to be educated abroad. In a book published in 1939, Bayen remembers with these words the aforementioned event: "I was told of my responsibility by His Majesty himself; that I was to study medicine and return to Ethiopia as a physician for the purpose of helping to organize the Public Health System." After around a year spent in Bombay, India to receive a British education, Bayen asked to be transferred to the United States, where he moved to in April 1922. The reason for this request was rooted in Bayen's conviction that "America was the only country that would never try to rob us (Ethiopia) of our country; therefore it would be best to go there." The same year, under President Warren G. Harding's suggestion, Bayen applied to Muskingum College in New Concord, Ohio, where he was admitted in 1925 and obtained his first degree three years later, becoming one of the first Ethiopians to obtain a degree in the United States. Subsequently, after being enrolled at the Ohio State University in Columbus as a graduate student in Chemistry for one year, in 1928, Bayen was admitted to the School of Medicine at Howard University in Washington (one of the most prestigious black educational institutions in the United States), where he pursued his second degree. In the same book published in 1939, the physician stated that the decision for matriculating at a black university was related to his desire of being in "closer contact with [his] people." During his years at medical school, Bayen met an African-American woman, Dorothy Hadley, for whom he decided to break his engagement with the daughter of the Ethiopian Minister of Foreign Affairs. In 1931, Dr. Bayen and Miss Hadley got married in Fairfax, Virginia, and in 1933, their first son, Malaku Bayen, Jr., was born.

== Commitment to Pan-Africanism ==
Pan Africanism flag created by the Universal Negro Movement

Between 1930 and 1935 Bayen worked out a plan to have highly qualified Afro-Americans go to Ethiopia as advisers to the government. Among the prominent figures that Bayen took to Ethiopia were Hubert Fauntleroy Julian and Dr. John West. The former, also known as "The Black Eagle", was an aviation pioneer and was invited by the future Ethiopian Emperor Haile Selassie to perform during his coronation ceremony. The latter, on the other hand, was a Washington, D.C.-based physician, who was sent to his native nation (Ethiopia) to work as a public health officer. Bayen was also instrumental in supporting John C. Robinson of Chicago (also called "The Brown Condor") in his intentions to volunteer to fight for Ethiopia during the Italo-Ethiopian war. Bayen's engagement with bringing black Americans to fight for and support the Ethiopian cause is also represented by his appeal to the Tuskegee Institute in Alabama, in the spring of 1935, to send some of its exceptional students to Ethiopia to help with the empire's agricultural development (unfortunately this plan failed due to the Italian invasion of Ethiopia). Moreover, in the years following the outbreak of the war, Bayen worked at building support for his country among black communities in the United States, by connecting with Afro-American religious and social and religious organizations. His commitment to Pan-Africanism and to his country is best explained by a speech he held at Bright Hope Baptist Church in Philadelphia where he told his audience that

Abyssinia is the pride of the black people of the world and the only thing that has delayed Italy's formal declaration of war thus far has been public opinion. If we are convicted it is because we are black. The American Negro is (therefore) duty-bound to support Abyssinia.

Due to his efforts and given his close relations with Emperor Selassie, Bayen became a pivotal figure for all Afro-Americans who wanted to volunteer in the Ethiopian Army.

== Creation of the Ethiopian World Federation ==
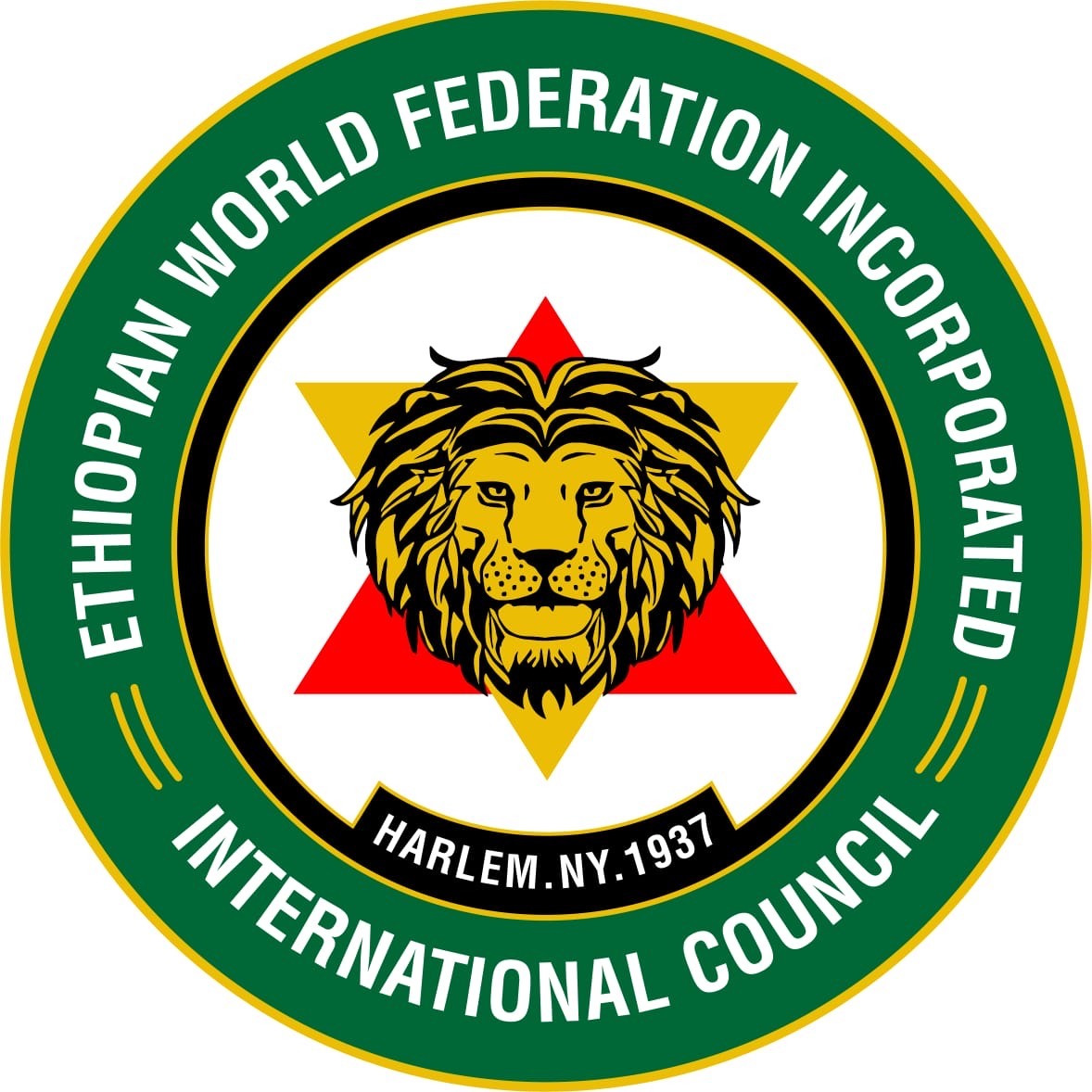
The Ethiopian World Federation, Incorporated

In 1935, after graduating from medical school, Bayen returned to Ethiopia. Bayen either returned to begin his residency at the American mission hospital, or because Emperor Selassie had requested his return following the escalation of conflicts in Ethiopia. For a few months, Bayen put his medical training to use working with the Ethiopian Red Cross, until Emperor Selassie was forced to flee Ethiopia in May 1936, just before Italy's capture of Addis Ababa. Accompanying Selassie was Bayen and his family, who fled with the Emperor to England. The Bayens did not remain in England long, however, and in September 1936, the Emperor sent Bayen to New York to serve as the Emperor's special envoy. While there, Bayen's main responsibility was to garner support for Ethiopian liberation. At first, Bayen became involved with a charitable relief organization, United Aid for Ethiopia, until internal difficulties pushed him to leave. Soon after, Bayen established the Ethiopian World Federation (EWF) on August 25, 1937, with the intent of drumming up support for Ethiopian liberation. According to the EWF's constitution, the primary goals of the EWF were to "effect Unity, Solidarity, Liberty, Freedom and Self-determination" amongst "Black Peoples of the World", as well as to "secure Justice and maintain the Integrity of Ethiopia". The African-American community in Harlem, where he and his family had settled, constituted the majority of the EWF's support and membership. Along with the EWF, Bayen and his wife Dorothy created a newspaper, the Voice of Ethiopia, in 1937. The Voice, while a vehicle to create support for Ethiopian liberation, also frequently reported on global injustices against black communities. During the height of its operations, the EWF fundraised for Ethiopia's liberation in a variety of ways. International donations and a Save-Ethiopia stamp campaign were amongst some of the tactics employed by Bayen and the EWF. Although a key aim of the EWF was Ethiopian liberation, the organization also focused on fostering black unity and disseminating information about Ethiopia and Africa at large.

== Legacy ==
A propagator of Black internationalism, Malaku Bayen's contributions to the subject of black unity and the Ethiopian effort toward freedom are left largely unreferenced. His legacy, however, did provide integral contributions toward the recognition of black unity. Bayen's insistence on establishing relations with the Afro-American community led to further interaction between them and the Ethiopian community. His attempts at stimulating international black brotherhood led to the professional advancement of many black working professionals. This, in turn, compounded the positive effect of black internationalism and furthered the cause of minority representation around the world. Following the advent of the Ethiopian War, Bayen intensified his efforts to unite the black community across continents. On September 28, 1936, he gave a speech at Rockland Palace, Harlem, that emphasized the continued sovereignty of Ethiopia, where he was met with significant approval. Furthermore, he created the Ethiopian World Federation, which is still active today, and at the time was integral in supporting the Ethiopian liberation movement and underlined the necessity of black unity as a hallmark of internationalism and freedom amongst races.

His creation of the Voice of Ethiopia newspaper in 1937 was used as a method of stimulating support for black communities around the globe and helped pave the way to better international representation. His literary contributions are little known but highlighted in his book, "The March of Black Men, Ethiopia Leads," a comprehensive account of the Ethiopian people and their battle for independence. Bayen's close relations with Emperor Selassie and his continued commitment to pan-Africanism particularly in the United States cemented him as a foremost figure for Afro-Americans and others involved in volunteering with the Ethiopian Army, and his efforts in advocating for black unity have left a significant mark on black nationalism across the world.

== Death ==
On May 4, 1940, after suffering from pneumonia and a series of mental breakdowns, Bayen died, leaving behind his wife and son, Malaku Jr. One year after his death, the Voice of Ethiopia seemingly dissolved, and all publications ceased. While the EWF still continues to exist, it has been falsely associated with the Rastafarian movement but widely available for all black people and ran by African Americans as stated in the original Articles of Incorporation.

== Bibliography ==
- Bayen, Malaku E. The March of Black men, Ethiopia leads: official report of the present state of affairs and prospectus : an authentic account of the determined fight of the Ethiopian people for their independence. New York, N.Y: Voice of Ethiopia Press, 1939.
- “DR. MALAKU E. BAYEN, SELASSIE'S PHYSICIAN: Cousin and Representative of Former Emperor Dies at 40.” New York Times (1923–), May 9, 1940.
- “Ethiopian World Federation.” Wikipedia. Wikimedia Foundation, January 21, 2023. https://en.wikipedia.org/wiki/Ethiopian_World_Federation.
- Gebrekidan, Fikru Negash. “Pan-Africanist in the court: W. E. B. Du Bois and his vision of Ethiopian internationalism.” Routledge Handbook of Pan-Africanism 1 (2020): 273–288.
- Muse, Clifford L. Jr. “Howard University and U.S. Foreign Affairs during the Franklin D. Roosevelt Administration, 1933–1945.” The Journal of African American History 87 (2002): 403–15.
- Robinson, Dino. “Dorothy Hadley: An Ethiopian Princess at the Birth of a Movement.” Shorefront 1 (2013): 5–8.
- Scott, William R., "Malaku E. Bayen: Ethiopian Emissary to Black America, 1936–1941," Ethiopia Observer, Vol. XV, No. 2 (1972).
- Shadle, Brett. “The Unity of Black People and the Redemption of Ethiopia: The Ethiopian World Federation and a New Black Nationalism, 1936–1940*.” International Journal of African Historical Studies 54, no. 2 (2021): 193–215.
