= Gelete Burka =

Ethiopian runner (born 1986)

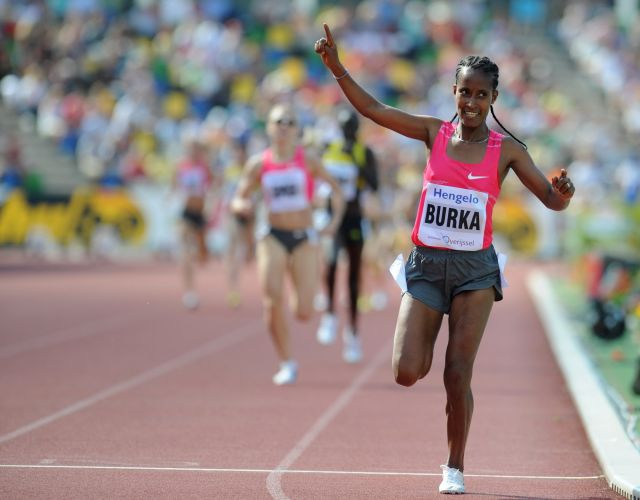

Personal information
- Born: January 23, 1986 (age 40) Kofele, Oromia, Ethiopia
- Height: 5 ft 3 in (1.60 m)
- Weight: 95 lb (43 kg)

Sport
- Country: Ethiopia
- Sport: Women's athletics
Medal record
Women's athletics
Representing Ethiopia
World Championships
Silver medal – second place	2015 Beijing	10,000 m
World Indoor Championships
Gold medal – first place	2008 Valencia	1500 m
Bronze medal – third place	2010 Doha	1500 m
Bronze medal – third place	2012 Istanbul	3000 m
African Games
Gold medal – first place	2007 Algiers	1500 m
Bronze medal – third place	2015 Brazzaville	10000 m
African Championships
Gold medal – first place	2008 Addis Ababa	1500 m
Silver medal – second place	2010 Nairobi	1500 m

Gelete Burka Bati (sometimes misspelled Burika, Oromo: Galate Burqaa Baati, Amharic: ገለቴ ቡርቃ; born 23 January 1986) is an Ethiopian middle-distance and long-distance runner. She was born in Kofele in the Arsi Zone of the Oromia Region, the same district as double Olympic champion Haile Gebrselassie.

Gelete was the short course champion at the 2006 IAAF World Cross Country Championships. She is a three-time medalist at the IAAF World Indoor Championships, her best performance being a gold medal win in the 1500 m in 2008. She is a four-time participant at the World Championships in Athletics (2005 to 2011) and represented Ethiopia at the Olympics in both 2008 and 2012.

She has also medalled on the regional stage, having been the runner-up at the 2010 African Championships in Athletics and the gold medallist at the 2007 All-Africa Games. She was the African record holder for the mile run and the indoor 1500 m.

== Career ==
Burka's first significant achievement was at the 2003 IAAF World Cross Country Championships, where she won the bronze in the junior race. She made her first impact in senior athletics later that year when, following the Ethiopian federation's refusal to allow Merima Denboba to compete, Burka took the women's race at the Lotto Cross Cup Brussels. She returned to Belgium the following year and repeated the feat. After becoming junior world champion in cross country running at the 2005 World XC Championships, she competed at the 2005 World Championships in Athletics to finish eighth in the 1500 metres race. A month later she won the bronze medal in 3000 metres at the World Athletics Final. She closed the season with a win at the Spanish Cross Internacional de Venta de Baños.

In April 2006 she won the short race at the World Cross Country Championships, as well as a gold medal in the team competition. She established herself as a force to be reckoned with on the cross country circuit, winning the Great Edinburgh International Cross Country three times consecutively from 2006 to 2008 and taking the Cross Internacional de Itálica title in 2007. Internationally, in 2007 she placed fourth at the World Cross Country Championships, was the 1500 m winner at the All-Africa Games and was tenth in the 5000 m at the 2007 World Championships in Athletics. She had improved her 5000 m best to 14:31.20 minutes that year. She was sixth at the 2008 IAAF World Cross Country Championships.

She represented her country at the 2008 Summer Olympics, but failed to make it out of the 1500 m heats. In September 2008 she set a new one mile African record of 4:18.23. The previous record (4:20.79) was held by Hassiba Boulmerka of Algeria and was set in 1991. She was a finalist at the 2009 World Championships in Athletics, but finished last in tenth place. She attempted to defend her 1500 m title at the 2010 IAAF World Indoor Championships, but was beaten by a younger Ethiopia (Kalkidan Gezahegne) and took the bronze medal on this occasion. She claimed the silver medal behind reigning Olympic champion Nancy Langat at the 2010 African Championships in Athletics in the outdoor season.

During the 2011 IAAF Diamond League circuit, she won the 1500 m at the Prefontaine Classic, but did not manage to finish the distance during the semi-finals at the 2011 World Championships in Athletics. She came second to a returning Tirunesh Dibaba at the 2011 San Silvestre Vallecana 10K race.

Gelete reached the podium for the third time running at the 2012 IAAF World Indoor Championships, finishing behind Hellen Obiri and Meseret Defar in the 3000 m. Newly focused on distances from 3000 m upwards, she came fourth in the 2012 IAAF Diamond League races in Doha, Rome, Lausanne and Brussels that year, and her best on the circuit was a third place at the Adidas Grand Prix in New York. She represented Ethiopia in the 5000 m for the first time at the London Olympics and came in fifth place. She made her debut over the 15K road distance at the Zevenheuvelenloop, placing fifth, then ended the year with at the San Silvestre Vallecana with an Ethiopian record of 30:53 minutes for the 10K road distance.

She began 2013 with a win at the Cross Internacional Juan Muguerza.

Gelete Burka placed 8th in 30:26.66 at Athletics at the 2016 Summer Olympics – Women's 10,000 metres.

== Personal bests ==
- 800 metres outdoor - 2:02.89 (2010)
- 1500 metres outdoor - 3:58.79 (2009)
- 1500 metres indoor - 3:59.75 (2008)
- Mile run outdoor - 4:18.23 (2008)
- Mile run indoor - 4:23.53 (2010)
- 3000 metres outdoor - 8:25.92 (2006)
- 3000 metres indoor - 8:31.94 (2008)
- 5000 metres outdoor - 14:31.20 (2007)
- 10,000 metres track - 30:26.66 (2016)
- 10K road - 32:01 (2014), (2017)
- Half marathon road - 1:09.32 (2016)
- Marathon road - 2:26.03 (2014)
