= Kokosa (Aanaa) =

Aanaa in Oromia, Ethiopia

Coordinates: 6°50′N 38°45′E

Kokosa is one of the Aanaas in the Oromia of Ethiopia. Being part of the West Arsi Zone, Kokosa is bordered on the south and west by the Sidama Region, on the north by the Kofele, on the northeast by Dodola, and on the southeast by Nensebo. The administrative center of this woreda is Kokosa; other towns include Diki, Gata, BokoreHebano, Hogiso.

== Overview ==
The majority of this woreda (95%) consists of undulating plains, with hills, valleys and mountains covering the rest. Rivers include the Genale, Logeta, Webe, Meganamo and Areba. A survey of the land in this woreda shows that 19.5% is arable or cultivable (51% of which was under annual crops), 70% pasture, 7.3% forest, and the remaining 3.2% is considered unusable or other. Ensete is an important food source.

Industry in the woreda includes some mining, some small scale businesses and open markets. There were 16 Farmers Associations with 7640 members and Farmers Service Cooperatives with 254 members. Kokosa has 68 kilometers of road, for an average density of 106 kilometers per 1000 square kilometers. About 48% of the total population has access to drinking water.

== Demographics ==
The 2007 national census reported a total population for this woreda of 144,549, of whom 70,022 were men and 74,527 were women; 3,224 or 2.23% of its population were urban dwellers. The majority of the inhabitants were Muslim, with 77.49% of the population reporting they observed this belief, while 14.4% of the population said they were Protestant, 4.44% of the population practiced traditional beliefs, and 2.09% practiced Ethiopian Orthodox Christianity.

Based on figures published by the Central Statistical Agency in 2005, this woreda has an estimated total population of 122,811, of whom 63,512 are men and 59,299 are women; 3,188 or 2.60% of its population are urban dwellers, which is less than the Zone average of 13.5%. With an estimated area of 636.88 square kilometers, Kokosa has an estimated population density of 192.8 people per square kilometer, which is greater than the Zone average of 27.

The 1994 national census reported a total population for this woreda of 88,834, of whom 43,139 were men and 45,695 women; 1,784 or 2.01% of its population were urban dwellers at the time. The three largest ethnic groups reported in Kokosa were the Oromo (95.05%), the Sidama (3.15%), and the Amhara (1.28%); all other ethnic groups made up 0.52% of the population. Oromiffa was spoken as a first language by 94.57%, 3.83% spoke Sidamo, and 1.53% spoke Amharic; the remaining 0.07% spoke all other primary languages reported. The majority of the inhabitants were Muslim, with 56.41% of the population having reported they practiced that belief, while 32.01% of the population held traditional beliefs, 5.98% professed Ethiopian Orthodox Christianity, 3.72% were Protestant, and 1.17% were Roman Catholic.
