= Arsi (given name) =

Arsi is a Finnish given name. Notable people with the name include:

- Arsi Harju (born 1974), Finnish former track and field athlete
- Arsi Nami (born 1984), Swedish-Persian actor, music therapist, singer, songwriter and screenwriter
- Arsi Piispanen (born 1985), Finnish former professional ice hockey forward
- Arsi Ruuskanen (born 1999), Finnish cross-country skier

== See also ==
- Arsi (disambiguation)
