= Census in Jamaica =

The census in Jamaica is an approximately decennial process recording information about the population of Jamaica. Conducting the census is the responsibility of the Statistical Institute of Jamaica (STATIN), founded in 1946 and known as the Central Bureau of Statistics until 1955, and then as the Department of Statistics until 1984.

== History ==
In 1871 the census recorded a population of 506,154 people, 246,573 of which were males, and 259,581 females. Their races were recorded as 13,101 white, 100,346 coloured (now known as the Browning Class), and 392,707 black.

The 1943 census was the first conducted using the de jure method. Under this method, "only persons who are permanent residents in the Island, even if they are temporarily away... are included." In addition, "all persons are finally recorded in the locality in which they permanently reside."

Following the 2011 census, it was noted some difficulties with carrying out the census were reported: "the level of cooperation particularly in some urban centres was disappointing. Worker attitude also presented problems as in a number of cases workers had to be relieved of their duties due to poor and or unproductive work. There was not always sufficient recognition of the fact that remuneration was for work done."

== Governing legislation ==
In 1929, the parliament passed a Census Law which was intended to facilitate a census in 1931. However, no census took place. The law was revised and reused to facilitate the 1943 census. Prior to 1929, all censuses "were taken under separate laws enacted for each particular census, each becoming spent at the completion of such census."

== List of censuses ==
Year	Day	Type	Total population	Notes
1844	3 June	De facto	377,433	
1861	6 May	De facto	441,264	
1871		De facto	506,154	
1881	1 April	De facto	580,804	
1891		De facto	639,491	
1911		De facto	831,383	
1921		De facto	858,118	
1943	4 January	De jure	1,237,063	
1960	7 April	De jure	1,609,814	
1970		De jure	1,848,512	
1980		De jure	2,190,357	
1991	8 April	De jure	2,380,666	
2001	10 September	De jure	2,607,632	
2011	4 April	De jure	2,683,707	
