= Dorothy Hadley Bayen =

American activist (1906–1988)

- Born: Dorothy Pauline Hadley; 20 November 1906; Evanston, Illinois, U.S.
- Died: 7 April 1988 (aged 81); Washington, D.C., U.S.
- Education: Howard University
- Known for: Pan-Africanism, Ethiopian World Federation
- Spouse: Malaku E. Bayen (married 1931 - 1940)
- Children: Malaku Bayen Jr.

Dorothy Hadley Bayen (20 November 1906 – 7 April 1988) was an African-American activist and journalist who became a war correspondent from 1935 to 1936 during the Second Italo-Ethiopian War whilst she was living in Ethiopia. Bayen fled Ethiopia with her husband Malaku E. Bayen and returned to the United States following the invasion of Addis Ababa, where she devoted her time and energy organising support for the Ethiopian liberation effort until her husband's death in 1940.

== Early life ==
Dorothy Pauline Hadley was born in Evanston, Illinois on 20 November 1906. Her father Joseph Hadley was a waterworks labourer. Her mother, Dora Hadley, born 27 February 1881, was a housewife.

Bayen attended Foster Middle School then Evanston Township High School graduating in 1924. After finishing high school Bayen initially attended Northwestern University, located in her hometown of Evanston. In addition to studying Bayen also worked at the university, likely to help finance her education. Bayen later transferred to Howard, a predominantly black university in Washington D.C., where she also took on work whilst pursuing her studies.

== Marriage and move to Ethiopia ==
Bayen met her husband, Malaku E. Bayen, whilst they were both students at Howard University. He was studying medicine. They married in Fairfax, Virginia on 29 September 1931. She was 25, he was 31. Many newspapers carried news of what was view as an exciting union between an Ethiopia prince and his African-American princess. However, claims by the press that Bayen was a prince were considered an exaggeration. Even though he was a distant relative of Emperor Haile Selassie he was not of the immediate royal household and thus not a titled prince.

Malaku "Chips" Bayen Jr., the Bayen's first and only child, was born in 1933. He worked in the performing arts in various roles, most notably as a lyricist and saxophonist.

Bayen moved to Ethiopia with her husband and young son in 1935, upon completion of his studies and qualification as a medical doctor. They sailed from New York to Paris in June, then travelled from Paris to Marseille by train, from Marseille to Djibouti by sea, and from Djibouti to Addis Ababa by road. The last leg of their journey by land reportedly took 12 days.

== Italo-Ethiopian War ==
Soon after their arrival in Addis Ababa, Bayen's husband had a mental breakdown. Though he quickly recovered, the outbreak of the Italo-Ethiopian War took him away from his young family when he was dispatched to the frontline, leaving his wife to cope with life in a country she was not used to. Left alone with their young son, Bayen indicated in letters to her junior sister, Leora Hadley, that she felt isolated with her husband away and unable to speak the local languages. In one letter, Bayen narrates how she didn't feel like celebrating Christmas alone and lonely. These letters can be found in the Dorothy Hadley Bayen papers at Yale University.

After a few months in Ethiopia, Bayen was contacted by the New York Amsterdam News and in February 1936, she became its wartime correspondent, reporting on the Italo-Ethiopian war for the African-American newspaper. This, however, was to be short-lived as the Bayens, along with Emperor Haile Selassie and other members of the royal court, were forced to flee Ethiopia when the Italian forces approached Addis Ababa.

The Bayens travelled with the royal entourage first to the United Kingdom where they stayed for a short while before leaving his imperial majesty for the U.S. At the behest of Haile Selassie, Bayen's husband was to become the Emperor's Special Envoy in the U.S., championing the Ethiopian cause against Italian aggression. The family arrived in the U.S. on 23 September 1936, docking at Ellis Island, New York.

== Ethiopian World Federation (E.W.F.) ==
On arrival in the US, the Bayens sought to galvanise support for Ethiopia, particularly amongst African-Americans, building on the outrage felt by many at the invasion of this sovereign African state that had escaped the clutches of European colonialism, the fate of so many African nations. Bayen was instrumental in the founding of the Ethiopian World Federation (E.W.F.) spearheaded by her husband in 1937. The first President of the E.W.F. was Dr. Lorenzo H. King, Pastor of St. Mark's Methodist Church, Harlem. Dorothy Bayen became one of three directors of the E.W.F in September 1937, along with Goulbourne M. Blacknett and Matthew E. Gardner. The other founding members of the E.W.F were Aida Bastian, Edora Paris, Warren Harrigan, and Louis Paul.

Soon after its inception, the E.W.F. launched a fundraising campaign. Despite efforts to garner support from sympathetic white Americans, the Bayens found that black America was its main source of funds. In an undated letter, Bayen wrote:

"We have been living downtown at the Rex Hotel 106 W. 47th St, to give the nordics a chance to aid us if they wished. We didn't want them to say “You went up to Harlem to the blacks to get help from them – not us.” That is the reason we located down there. In the five weeks there, we got $7 from whites and around $1,700 from blacks so we decided that they do not intend to help. It is my belief that the redemption of Ethiopia lies within the hands of the black peoples of the world and that the unity of all the black peoples and the redemption of Ethiopia are convergent(?) problems. As you know, our fault and our weakness has been in the fact that we will not unite.”

The E.W.F. also produced a weekly newspaper, The Voice of Ethiopia, which in its first year rose from a circulation of 2,000 to 10,000 per week. The Voice of Ethiopia simultaneously denounced the war in Ethiopian and the denial of civil rights for African-Americans in the U.S. due to racial discrimination and segregation.

== Later life ==
Throughout their marriage, Bayen's husband suffered from mental health problems. He eventually died of pneumonia on 4 May 1940 whilst on admission to a mental health institution in New York. His death came exactly one year before the war in Ethiopia ended. Bayen suffered a further loss after her husband died when her mother, Dora Hadley, died two years later on 12 June 1942.

Following the death of her husband, Bayen appears to have stepped back from political activism, returning once more to work at her alma mater, Howard University. In 1947 she returned for a brief visit to Ethiopia with her 15-year-old son.

Bayen died on 7 April 1988 in Washington D.C. Her personal papers were donated to Yale University by her sister Leora Hadley.
