= Kofele =

- Location within Ethiopia
- Coordinates: 07°00′N 38°45′E
- Country: Ethiopia
- Region: Oromia
- Zone: West Arsi Zone
- Woreda: Kofele
- Elevation: 2,695 m (8,842 ft)

Population (2005)
  - Total: 13,127
- Time zone: UTC+3 (EAT)

Kofele is a town in Oromia Region Ethiopia, and the administrative center of the Kofele woreda. Located in the West Arsi Zone of the Oromia Region, this town has a latitude and longitude of 7°00′N 38°45′E with an elevation of 2695 meters above sea level.

According to the Oromia Regional government, there are two telephone stations and a post office agent in Kofele. Primary, junior secondary and senior secondary schools are present, as well as medical and veterinary clinics. Although electricity is available, there are no fuel stations. Recently there are financial institution such as banks that are installing their branches in Kofele.

== History ==
Kofele was founded on the orders of Balambaras Chakiiso Tuuri in the 1910s; Waako Oborra laid out the market where the town has since occupied. The community was important at the beginning as an assembly point for long-distance caravans because of its water, grazing and strategic location. In the 1930s, Swedish missionaries operated a small school in Kofele; they returned to the town after the Italian occupation. By 1956, however, the road connecting Kofele to Shashamene remained so poor that it took 6 hours to drive the 25 kilometers.

In one of his many published accounts of life in Kofele, P.T.W. Baxter records that in the 1969 Parliamentary elections that the two-seat constituency which included Kofele returned two Arsi Oromo members. Although Arsi made up the overwhelming majority of the electorate, this was the first time that two Arsi had been elected, Baxter explains, "because more Arssi had been persuaded to register and to vote." However the provincial governor ruled the results improper, disqualified one of the candidates, and ordered a fresh election. In the second election, Arsi Oromo voters were intimidated, and the majority prevented from voting with the result that a Christian northerner was elected. "The defeated candidate was transformed from a traditionalist and Government time-server into a tribal martyr," Baxter notes.

== Demographics ==
Based on figures from the Central Statistical Agency in 2005, this town has an estimated total population of 13,127 of whom 6,690 are men and 6,437 are women. The 1994 national census reported this town had a total population of 2,563 of whom 1,252 were men and 1,311 were women.

== Climate ==
Climate data for Kofele, elevation 2,680 m (8,790 ft), (1971–2000)
Month	Jan	Feb	Mar	Apr	May	Jun	Jul	Aug	Sep	Oct	Nov	Dec	Year
Mean daily maximum °C (°F)	21.3 (70.3)	21.0 (69.8)	21.6 (70.9)	20.7 (69.3)	20.0 (68.0)	18.9 (66.0)	17.8 (64.0)	17.4 (63.3)	18.2 (64.8)	19.3 (66.7)	19.7 (67.5)	20.2 (68.4)	19.7 (67.4)
Mean daily minimum °C (°F)	6.6 (43.9)	8.9 (48.0)	9.4 (48.9)	8.9 (48.0)	9.5 (49.1)	9.6 (49.3)	9.7 (49.5)	9.5 (49.1)	8.9 (48.0)	8.7 (47.7)	7.1 (44.8)	6.2 (43.2)	8.6 (47.5)
Average precipitation mm (inches)	28.0 (1.10)	60.0 (2.36)	114.0 (4.49)	148.0 (5.83)	90.0 (3.54)	110.0 (4.33)	145.0 (5.71)	149.0 (5.87)	143.0 (5.63)	98.0 (3.86)	61.0 (2.40)	24.0 (0.94)	1,170 (46.06)
Average relative humidity (%)	54	57	58	59	66	73	85	86	82	72	61	56	67
Source: FAO
