= Immigration to Jamaica =

Immigration to Jamaica has historically affected the country in large ways as a result of the history of European colonization of the Americas. In the modern age, immigration is the responsibility of the Passport, Immigration and Citizenship Agency (PICA), an agency of the Government of Jamaica. By the late 2010s emigration continued to be greatly in excess of immigration.

== History ==
Jamaica is a richly diverse country in ethnicity due to the history of colonialism, slavery and immigration. The population is primarily descended from people of mixed African and European descent.

The Spanish were the first Europeans to land at Jamaica and they enslaved many of the Arawak. The first Africans arrived in Jamaica in 1513 from Spain. The first Irish people came to Jamaica after the English won control of the island from the Spanish in 1655. Many of them came to the island as indentured servants.

Oliver Cromwell increased the island's European population by sending indentured servants and prisoners to Jamaica. Due to Irish emigration resulting from the wars in Ireland at this time two-thirds of this 17th-century European population was Irish. By 1763, the ratio of blacks to whites had grown to thirty blacks to every one white person.

After 1809, when the slave trade was abolished, an estimated 1,000,000 Africans were transported to the island. By the 19th century the black population vastly outnumbered the white population. The Syrian-Lebanese community was established in Jamaica in the early 19th century.

Numerous Chinese migrants who worked on the construction of the Panama Canal settled in Jamaica. In 1931 the Jamaican government issued a decree that limited the inflow of Chinese to students under the age of 14. The net migration figures in Jamaica from 2002 to 2019 was -270,000.

Haitian refugees have travelled to Jamaica. The settlement of refugees in Jamaica has been not uncontroversial. Deportations are administered by the Passport, Immigration and Citizenship Agency (PICA). In March 2023, PICA employees struck over pay. As a result, there was disruption at the islands two international airports.

== China ==
Chinese immigrants came to Jamaica in three major waves; 1854-1884, 1900-1940 and the 1980s.

== France ==
French immigration to Jamaica began in 1791.

== India ==
The first Indians came to Jamaica aboard the S. Blundel Hunter on 10 May 1845.

== See also ==
- Demographics of Jamaica
- British Jamaicans, British people who were born in Jamaica or who are of Jamaican descent
- Jamaican Americans, Caribbean Americans who have full or partial Jamaican ancestry
