= Ethiopian World Federation =

Charitable organization

The Ethiopian World Federation, Incorporated
- The Ethiopian World Federation, Incorporated
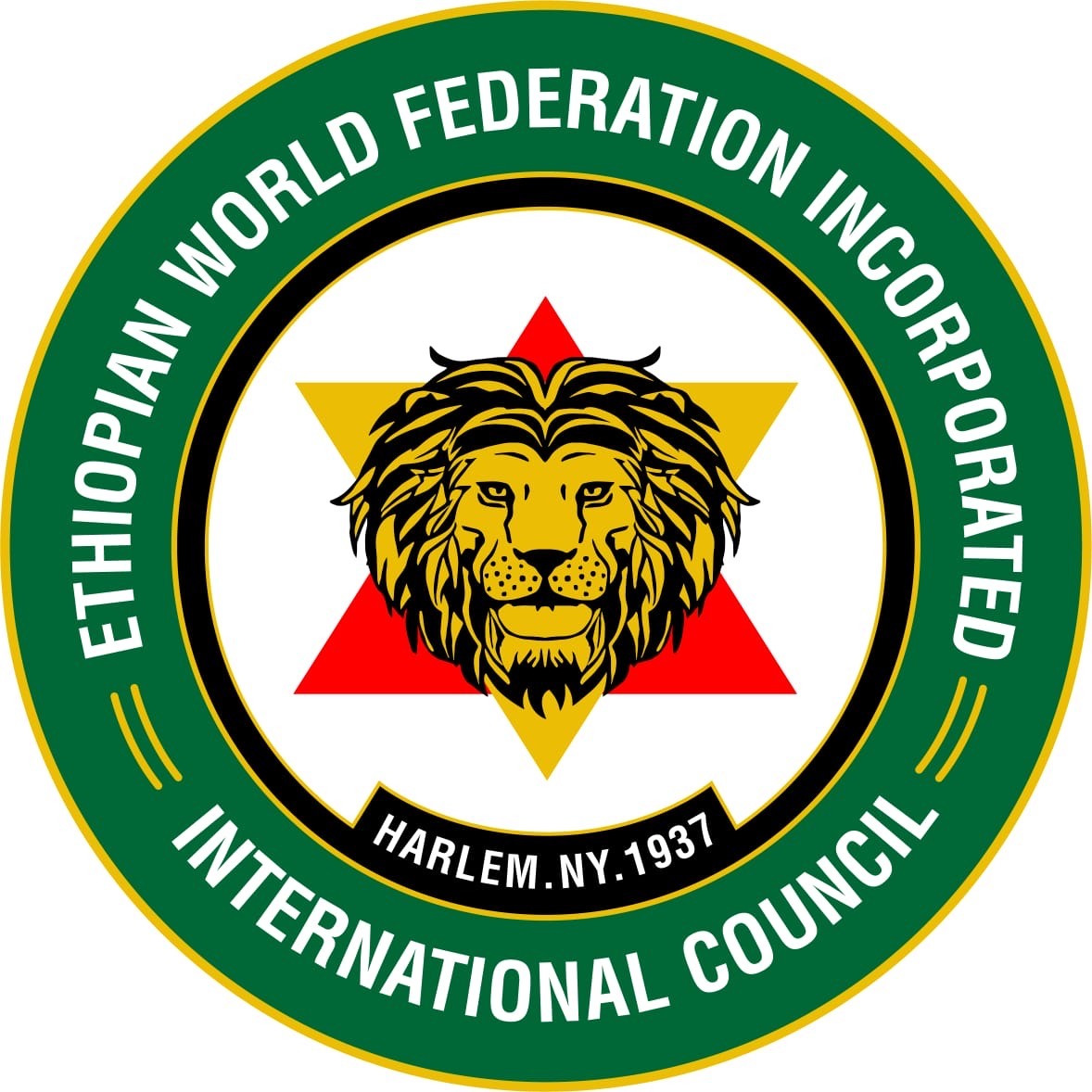
- Founded: August 25, 1937
- Headquarters: Harlem, New York, U.S.
- Location: United States of America
- Founder: Dorothy Bayen Emperor Haile Selassie I
- Key people: Malaku Bayen
- Affiliations: Intergovernmental Organization
- Website: theethiopianworldfederation.org

The Ethiopian World Federation, Incorporated (EWF) is an intergovernmental organization that was founded on August 25, 1937 in New York City under the advice of Emperor Haile Selassie I by Dr. Malaku Emanuel Bayen and Princess Dorothy Bayen; Dr. Malaku Bayen was the cousin and personal physician of the Emperor. The aims were to mobilize African American support for the Ethiopians during the Italian invasion of 1935-41, and to embody the unity of Ethiopians (Black people) at home and abroad.

Many locals were established in other parts of the World with the intention to provide services to local communities. The EWF was given custodianship over an area of land in Ethiopia named Shashemane for the fearless efforts of African Americans that rendered support to Emperor Haile Selassie I during the Italian invasion by Mussolini. The Headquarter office has always been in close proximity of the United Nations giving the official administrator and governing body access to oversee the growth and management over the housing, education, cultivation, development of the continent, refugee support and the advancement of education, technology and cultural integration.

In the early 1950s, the local branches became insubordinate to the parent organization, increasingly losing focus of its constitutional duties and eventually redacted by The State Attorney's office in 2008. The current administration for the EWF ran a campaign in Africa to appeal to the youth in 2020 which eventually reinstated its non profit status getting the EWF back on track with its constitutional duties. Since then, many African countries have become increasingly identified with the Global African Diaspora movement and the EWF has built good relations securing and supplying global grassroots organizations with the tools and education needed to govern themselves when their leaders fail to protect their basic Human Rights and integrity.

== History ==
The EWF built on the efforts of African Americans who, in 1936, sent a delegation consisting of three prominent Harlem figures, all leaders of The Black owned Organization known as United Aid for Ethiopia. Reverend William Lloyd Imes, Pastor of the prestigious St. James Presbyterian Church, Philip M. Savory of the Victory Insurance Company and co-owner of the New York Amsterdam News, and Cyril M. Philp, secretary of United Aid, sailed to England in the summer of 1936 to speak with Emperor Haile Selassie concerning financial matters. In response, the Emperor empowered his personal physician His Imperial Highness Prince Malaku E. Bayen, Phd., as his personal emissary. Bayen at first worked with United Aid for Ethiopia, but the next year he dissolved that body and founded the EWF to take its place.

The EWF was formally established on August 25, 1937, in New York City as The Ethiopian World Federation, Incorporated. It was originally a not-for-profit membership organization incorporated in the State of New York with Articles of Incorporation that established the EWF as an American company that promotes American values and is operated by 2/3 African Americans that reside in the city of New York, New York. The EWF was given a private Constitution and ByLaws in which, when followed precisely, carefully commits, engages and naturally enhances the biological relationship with The Ethiopian Orthodox Tewahedo Church.

By 1937, Emperor Haile Selassie I was impressed by the participation of Black people in the Harlem Renaissance, he toured many universities in The United States. He knew that the business ethics and determination of Harlem Americans would greatly benefit from employing a treaty. This treaty came with a permanent secretariat, with a global membership—that does not pay taxes so long as High contracting parties such as the EWF continue to provide and fulfill all constitutional advancements, updates, responsibilities, transparency, refugee support etc. The EWF is not obliged to provide information to any parliament. The privileges and immunities are intended to ensure their independent and effective functioning. The headquarters' growth is important to foster a sense of community independence and economic prosperity. Military alliances are also formed to in order to ensure security of the members to ward off outside threats.

The formation and inclusiveness of the EWF Constitution and ByLaws along with the Treaty of Amity and Economic Relations between Ethiopia and the United States of America has encouraged autocratic states to develop into democracies in order to form an effective and internal government. If international organizations want the advantages listed in the title, they need to fit the Act's definition of what an "international organization" is. The Secretary of State was given the power to advise the President (who makes the final decisions) on matters like whether an organization should or should not be granted protection under the IOIA. Also, organizations and their employees can only receive these benefits if the Secretary of State notifies and acknowledges the international organization and its workers. The Secretary of State also has the power to determine if an employee's presence is no longer "desirable"; in such instances, the Secretary of State can have the employee deported (the international organization, however, has to be notified first and the employee has to be allotted a reasonable time to leave).

The main purpose was set out in the following preamble:

We the Black People of the World, in order to effect Unity, Solidarity, Liberty, Freedom and self-determination, to secure Justice and maintain the Integrity of Ethiopia, which is our divine heritage, do hereby establish and ordain this constitution for The Ethiopian World Federation, Incorporated.

The EWF was at first made up primarily of Ethiopian students who came to America to study abroad, after the official coronation of Emperor Haile Selassie. It gained support from the Black community of Harlem, and deprecated the term "Negro" in favour of an African and Ethiopian identity.

Max Bedacht, general secretary of the International Workers Order, presents a $500 check on to representatives of the EWF, November 14, 1941

The isolationist policy of the United States prevented the participation of Americans getting involved in what they perceived as being a European affair and didn't want to be sucked into a second world war. This however did not prevent American negroes from seeking other alternatives. Consequentially under the Ethiopian World Federation, Incorporated in 1936 somewhere between 500 and 1,500 black Americans were conscripted into the Second Italo-Ethiopian War (Ge'ez: ጣልያን ወረራ) on the side of Ethiopia against Benito Mussolini after having adopted Ethiopian citizenship and names. Most notably the Tuskegee Airman John C. Robinson, the Brown Condor of Chicago. Tensions arose in America which sparked violent controversy between black and Italian Americans at that time. Bayen set up the EWF's newspaper, The Voice of Ethiopia, and led the project of federating the EWF. The first branch of the EWF outside the United States was set up in Kingston, Jamaica, and by 1940 there were EWF chapters in various parts of Latin America and the Caribbean. Bayen died in 1940 and was succeeded as leader by Lij Araya Abebe, then in 1943 by Elks Exalted Ruler Finley Wilson.

As a direct result of the support Ethiopia received from black people in the West, mainly at that time African-Americans, during the Italian invasion of 1935–1941, the Emperor in 1948 granted five Gashas (approximately 200 hectares) of land near Shashamane to the EWF for African-Americans in the Diaspora who desired to return to Africa. Many families moved to Shashamane, many of which would later come from Jamaica. Following the disappearance of Emperor Haile Selassie I and the events leading up to the Ethiopian Red Terror (Amharic: ቀይ ሽብር ḳäy shəbbər), also known as the Qey Shibir, the Soviet backed communist regime known as Derg appropriated much of the land in 1975, though people still remain to today.

On September 7, 1951 Emperor Haile Selassie I ratified the Treaty of Amity and Economic Relations between Ethiopia and the United States of America. Right afterwards, in October 1951, he ordered the EWF to register the corporation with the Internal Revenue Service as a 501(c)(4) organization, equipped with enough diplomatic immunity to operate as an intergovernmental organization that can create guidelines for cultural inclusion, preserve peace through conflict resolution, restructure local and international relations, promote international cooperation on matters such as environmental protection, curriculums for African education, protection of human rights, civil rights under the color of law, technology, agriculture, social development, cultural rights, religious rights, traditional rights, cannabis rights, the right to health care, to render humanitarian aid and economic development.

In 2023, the EWF, under the current administration of International President Donah Sandford, First VP LaKeisha Sweet, 2nd Vice Phoebe Wabbington, International Organizer Carlton Henderson, International Secretary Terrence Jones, International Treasurer Brandy Tidwell, International Chaplain Priest Ampiah Edmond, Director Jamel Manning, Director Jevaughn Wolfe and Director Priscilla Neris Da Silva reached a plateau by lawfully and successfully reinstating the EWF's non-profit status with the U.S. state of New York. This noble initiative is not only dedicated to refugees and victims of crime but they are dedicated to corporate and private sector reform, reconciliation and resolution even if it means lobbying in Washington D.C. or activating their intergovernmental immunities and access to administrative tribunals. The Ethiopian World Federation, Incorporated is an international organization that holds the proof of its subsidiaries in a private document only distributed by HQ and The State Attorney of The United States of America. EWF has also come up with a strict fraud proof policy to collaborate with the U.S. Government to remove insubordinate local charters and investigate them for breaching historical policies. The Ethiopian World Federation, Incorporated is one of the oldest intergovernmental organizations besides the International Telecommunication Union (founded in 1865) and The League of Nations, founded on 10 January 1920.
