= Gladstone Robinson =

Jamaican cricketer (1943–2010)

Personal information
- Full name: Gladstone Adolph Robinson
- Born: 24 January 1943
- Died: 8 January 2010 (aged 66)
- Source: Cricinfo, 26 April 2020

Gladstone Robinson (24 January 1943 – 8 January 2010) was a Jamaican cricketer who played in three first-class matches between 1963 and 1965.
