= Dodola (Aanaa) =

District of Oromia, Ethiopia

Coordinates: 6°50′N 39°10′E

Dodola is one of the Aanaas in the Oromia of Ethiopia. It is named after the administrative center of the woreda, Dodola. It was the capital city of Ganale Awraja. Ganale's modern administration leadership was begun by Fit Awrary Woldemeckael Buie Falama(fiit awraarii Woldamikaa'el Bu'ii Falamaa). He was a single charismatic leader who attracted both his nation and the last Ethiopian king, Haile Selassie. Because of his impact and legacy, thousands of Ganale Awraja residents still remember him as their transforming leader who thought ahead of his time. Because he transformed his nation, a nation which never had school, road, telephone, or airport, to test the modern services, by starting modern education in 1940s and the second school 1950s, airport (which disconnected by Dergu), road, and telephone. His nephew, Mekonnen Hassen Buie, who is best known as a great mediator and inclusiveness, kept his uncle's legacy and helped to build the first high school in the Awraja Ganale (at that time Dodola, Adaba, Nansabo, and Kokossa were led by Awraja Gazei) in 1961 and get adequate drinking water for his city. Today, Dodola is part of the West Arsi Zone with the capital city of west arsi zone is shashamene(Shaashamannee), Dodola is bordered on the south by Nensebo, on the west by Kokosa, on the north by the Shebelle River which separates it from the Kofele and Gedeb Asasa, and on the east by Adaba. Other towns include Herero.

== Overview ==
The highest points in this woreda are Mount Ilale, Mount Korduro and Mount Somkeru. Rivers include the Keresa, Ukuma, Negeso and Gude Yerso which are tributaries of the Shebelle. A survey of the land in Dodola shows that 28.3% is arable or cultivable (5.1% of the total was part of state farms), 17.4% pasture, 48.9% forest (including 696.76 square kilometers of natural vegetation and 12.24 of man-made forest), and the remaining 5.4% is considered swampy, mountainous or otherwise unusable. Notable landmarks include the sites of Adele Angato and Hora Birialle. Linseed, onion, vegetables, and fruits are important cash crops.

Industry in the woreda includes 32 small industries using local raw materials, 25 grain mills, 4 edible oil mills, 2 wood works and one wheat flour mill employing 62 people, as well as 202 wholesalers 420 retailers and 63 service providers. There were 19 Farmers Associations with 53,958 members and 9 Farmers Service Cooperatives with 7072 members. Dodola has 93 kilometers of all grades of road, for an average road density of 57.7 kilometers per 1000 square kilometers. About 40% of the total population has access to drinking water.

== Demographics ==
The 2007 national census reported a total population for this woreda of 193,812, of whom 95,065 were men and 98,747 were women; 34,151 or 17.62% of its population were urban dwellers. The majority of the inhabitants were Muslim, with 88.98% of the population reporting they observed this belief, while 9.46% of the population said they practiced Ethiopian Orthodox Christianity, 1.29% of the population were Protestant.

Based on figures published by the Central Statistical Agency in 2005, this woreda has an estimated total population of 180,863, of whom 93,480 are men and 87,383 are women; 30,358 or 16.79% of its population are urban dwellers, which is greater than the Zone average of 13.5%. With an estimated area of 1,612.66 square kilometers, Dodola has an estimated population density of 112.2 people per square kilometer, which is greater than the Zone average of 27.

The 1994 national census reported a total population for this woreda of 126,495, of whom 61,125 were men and 65,370 women; 16,976 or 13.42% of its population were urban dwellers at the time. The two largest ethnic groups reported in Dodola were the Oromo (91.76%), and the Amhara (6.14%); all other ethnic groups made up 2.1% of the population. Oromiffa was spoken as a first language by 90.33%, and 8.78% spoke Amharic; the remaining 0.89% spoke all other primary languages reported. The majority of the inhabitants were Muslim, with 82.61% of the population having reported they practiced that belief, while 14.87% of the population said they professed Ethiopian Orthodox Christianity, and 1.72% practiced traditional beliefs.

== Administration ==
The Dodola Aanaa is administered under the West Arsi Zone of the Oromia Regional State. The urban center of Dodola is governed by the Dodola City Mayor's Office, which oversees urban development, public services, and local governance for residents of Dodola and surrounding communities.
