= Shashamane =

City in Oromia Region, Ethiopia

Shashemene Shaashamannee (in Oromo)
- City
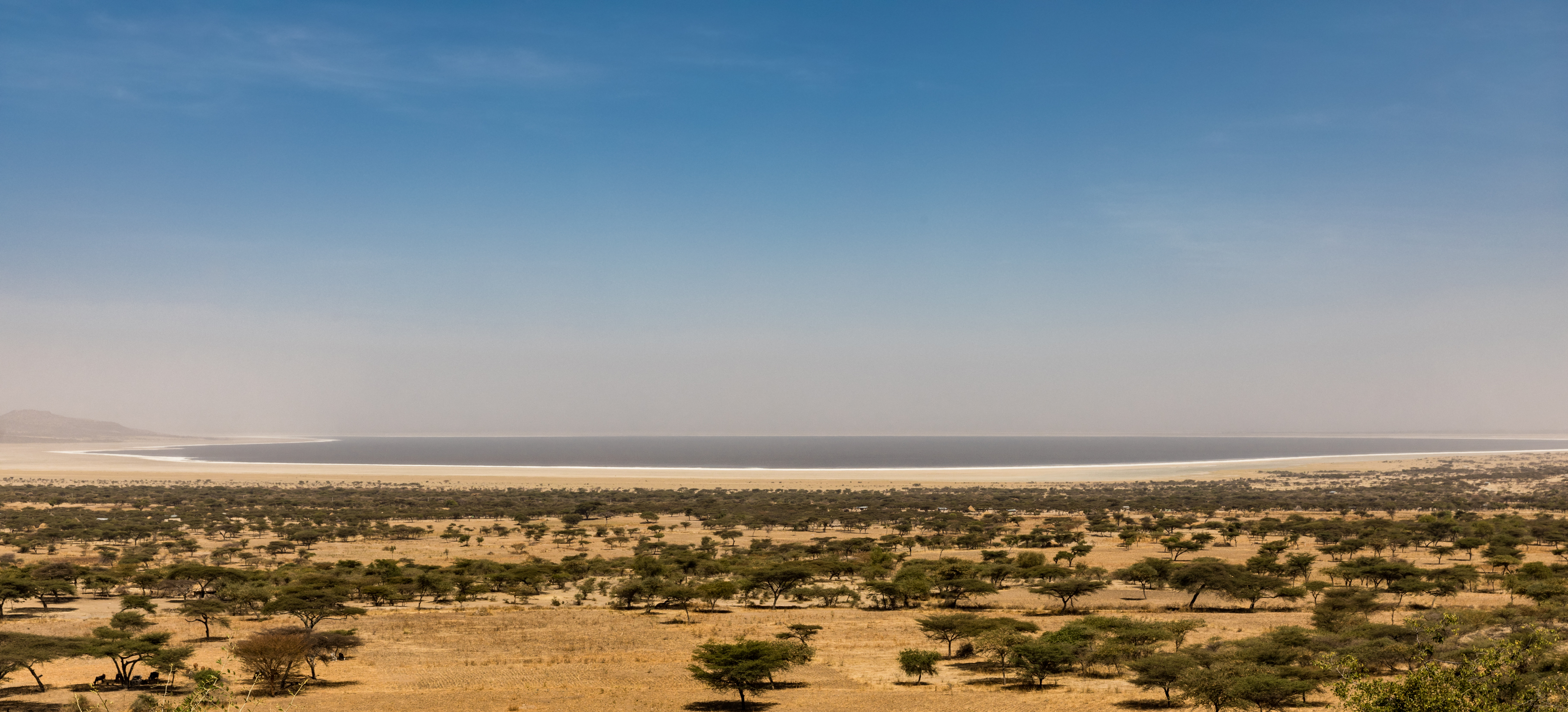
- From top, left to right: Main road of Shashemene; Black Lion Museum; fruits produced in Shashemene, and Abijatta-Shalla National Park
- Nickname: Shashe
- Motto: Best Business Center
- Location within Ethiopia
- Coordinates: 7°12′N 38°36′E
- Country: Ethiopia
- Region: (Oromia Region) Oromia
- Zone: West Arsi

Area
  - Total: 17.19 km^{2} (6.64 sq mi)

Population (2007)
  - Total: 407,000
  - Estimate (mid 2022): 408,368
  - Density: 23,700/km^{2} (61,300/sq mi)
- Time zone: UTC+3 (EAT)
- Climate: Cwb

Shashamane (Oromo: Shaashamannee, Amharic: ሻሸመኔ) is a city in southern Ethiopia. Located in the Oromia Region with a 2007 Census population of 100,454, but with an estimated 208,368 inhabitants in mid 2022; the town is known for its Rastafarian community. The town has numerous sub-cities, namely Abosto, Alelu, Arada, Awasho, Dida boqe, Bulchana, Burqa Gudina, Kuyera, Awasho Dhenqu, Aleche Harebate, Edola burqa, Alelu Ilu, Bute filicha, Kerara filicha, Ilala Qorke, Meja Dema, and Bulchana Deneba. The resort of Wondo Genet lies near Shashamane, as does the Senkele Wildlife Sanctuary.

== History ==
Following the end of the Italian invasion in 1941 and Emperor Haile Selassie's return to the throne, he made plans to grant 500 acres of fertile land to black refugees in 1948 in response to racism in the United States.

Haile Selassie formed the first Ethiopian World Federation (EWF) in Harlem, New York and prepared a series of events to bond with African Americans for the Ethiopian culture before announcing The Land Grants. While one of the female members of the EWF was visiting Jamaica she leaked the information about the Land Grant with the people of Jamaica. The Land Grants were specifically intended for African Americans in return for intervening in favor of the royal family during the second world war. Once information about the possibility of immigration to Ethiopia spread many made plans to immigrate, divisions of the EWF began appearing internationally to take advantage of the Land Grants Haile Selassie left for African Americans. The official letter confirming the "Land Grant" of 1948 was submitted to the members and executives of the Ethiopian World Federation in New York City in 1955.

The first West Indian family and Federation members were James Piper and his wife Helen who arrived that same year as the first Land Grant administrators, returning to make a permanent settlement in 1955 on behalf of the federation. Haile Selassie visited Jamaica one time in an effort to get the natives to focus on uplifting their communities before visiting Ethiopia. By the time he left, the Rastafarian community was certain that Haile Selassie was the second coming of Jesus. He encouraged them to take care of the land that they had already been given in their own country. Haile Selassie left specific instructions with the U.S. and Africa pertaining to the Land Grant. African Americans were fed-up, after having fought in two world wars and were still denied land and civil rights in America. They had a very hard time trying to stabilize their families, their citizenship, their equal rights all while figuring out their nationality while America was repairing itself for desegregation. They were promised that the land would be there when they were tired of fighting for civil rights and equality in the United States. Meanwhile, the Rastafarian community in Jamaica was growing and many were planning immigration.

The first Rastafarian that settled in Ethiopia, Gladstone Robinson, was also an official delegate of a division of the EWF that went to Shashamane on behalf of the organization in June 1964, followed by Papa Noel Dyer, who hitchhiked from England to Ethiopia, eventually arriving in September 1965. Mr. Robinson would later be appointed as the Land Grant administrator by a Division of The Federation executive council in 1967 thus replacing Mr. Piper and his wife in Ethiopia.

It was within a couple of years that Rastafari immigration began, with the population swelling past 2,000 at one point. It was reported in 2004 that their numbers had dwindled from more than 2,000 to fewer than 300 according to a recent CNN interview with Robinson and other Rastafari settlers.

Jamaican settlers petitioned Emperor Haile Selassie for Ethiopian citizenship and other benefits several times. Once the Jamaican settlers began having children and inviting more people to the African Americans' soil, they began asking for more. They eventually grew suspicious of the belief that Haile Selassie was the second coming of Jesus. A few weeks later, the Jamaican Daily Gleaner reported that EWF members in Jamaica left for Ethiopia on 5 September to develop the settlement with no money or support from their original country.

After leaders of both Jamaican political parties, Hugh Shearer and Michael Manley, each paid visits to the community in September 1969, Haile Selassie himself again visited and, according to EWF number 37 leader Mortimer Planno, cautioned them against bringing Jamaican politics to Ethiopia. The following year, the Imperial Court ordered ten hectares apiece to be parceled out to twelve "pioneer" Rastafari settlers, as reported in The Gleaner on 5 September 1970.

According to the EWF, Haile Selassie again paid a visit on 1 October 1970, asking to speak to the then land grant administrator, James Piper, who was not a Rastafari. Piper declined to appear, claiming it was his Sabbath. This resulted in a change in administration at the settlement. It is reported that due to this and other incidents, Robinson replaced the Pipers as administrators the land prior to the Derg revolution.

Because of the "anti-organization" sentiments of many Rastas of that day, the federation's official authority was compromised. Many created other organizations, entities and groups in attempts to further deal with their own ways and means of repatriation. For example, one of the Rasta settlers, Clifton Baugh, was a main representative for the Rasta community in palace discussions on the land grant with minister Ato Tesfi, and Baugh also continually delivered the first fruits of their produce to the palace in Addis right up until 1974 when stopped by the Derg Revolution.

When Haile Selassie I was assassinated in 1975, the new government of Mengistu Haile Mariam confiscated by the state due to the new governments Communist policy on privatization in which citizens were not allowed to own land.

In January 2005, there were reports in the media that Bob Marley's remains were to be exhumed and reburied at Shashemane. His wife Rita Marley described Ethiopia as his spiritual home, provoking controversy in Jamaica, where his remains still lie. The following month, thousands of fans gathered in Shashamane for a month of celebrations for what would have been Marley's 60th birthday. Rita Marley did not perform in Shashemane, Prime Minister Meles Zenawi created a new ethnic federalist parliament which further complicated things in the region. Tribal conflicts soon erupted and the history of Shashamane was undermined by the socialist administration of the Tigray People's Liberation Front. Although TPLF had claimed to be socialist during its fight against the Derg regime, it abandoned it when it seized power.

In January 2007, the settlers organized an exhibition and a bazaar in the city. It was also reported recently prior to the Ethiopian millennium that various pro-Ethiopian World Federation groups, consisting of indigenous Ethiopians and Rastafari, have given support to one of many five-year plans proposed for sustainable development of Shashemane, Ethiopia.

== Demographics ==
The 2007 national census reported a total population for this town of 100,454, of whom 50,654 were men and 49,800 were women. A plurality of the inhabitants practiced Ethiopian Orthodox Christianity, with 43.44% of the population reporting they observed this belief, while 31.15% of the population said they were Muslim, 23.53% of the population were Protestant, and 1.3% were Catholic.

The 1994 national census reported the town had a total population of 52,080, 25,426 of whom were males and 26,654 were females. It had an estimated 208,368 inhabitants in mid 2022. There are four rivers (Laftu, Melka Oda, Gogeti and Essa) that flow through the town towards Lake Shala. Dhedhaba is another major river that serves as a natural boundary between Shashemene and Arsi Negele.

== Sport ==
Shashemene City is a football club who played in Ethiopian Higher League but have been promoted into the Ethiopian Premier League (2024).

== Culture ==
=== In media ===
In 2016, Shashamane, a documentary film about Shashamane and its relationship to repatriation, was released.

=== Cuisine ===
The cuisine of Shashamane is heavily vegetarian because of the influence of the Rastafarian population.

== Climate ==
Climate data for Shashamane (Kuyera), elevation 2,010 m (6,590 ft), (1971–2000)
| Month | Jan | Feb | Mar | Apr | May | Jun | Jul | Aug | Sep | Oct | Nov | Dec | Year |
|---|---|---|---|---|---|---|---|---|---|---|---|---|---|
| Mean daily maximum °C (°F) | 25.0 (77.0) | 25.0 (77.0) | 25.8 (78.4) | 25.6 (78.1) | 25.1 (77.2) | 23.9 (75.0) | 21.9 (71.4) | 23.1 (73.6) | 22.7 (72.9) | 24.0 (75.2) | 24.2 (75.6) | 24.9 (76.8) | 24.3 (75.7) |
| Mean daily minimum °C (°F) | 8.1 (46.6) | 10.2 (50.4) | 11.4 (52.5) | 12.8 (55.0) | 11.8 (53.2) | 11.2 (52.2) | 11.5 (52.7) | 11.3 (52.3) | 11.8 (53.2) | 10.4 (50.7) | 8.2 (46.8) | 6.9 (44.4) | 10.5 (50.8) |
| Average precipitation mm (inches) | 32.0 (1.26) | 79.0 (3.11) | 72.0 (2.83) | 101.0 (3.98) | 91.0 (3.58) | 96.0 (3.78) | 152.0 (5.98) | 126.0 (4.96) | 137.0 (5.39) | 63.0 (2.48) | 31.0 (1.22) | 3.0 (0.12) | 983 (38.69) |
| Average relative humidity (%) | 57 | 54 | 59 | 63 | 74 | 75 | 78 | 77 | 77 | 71 | 58 | 52 | 66 |
Source: FAO

== See also ==
- Jamaicans in Ethiopia

== Notes ==
1.
