= Arsi Negele (woreda) =

District in Oromia Region, Ethiopia

Coordinates: 7°20′N 38°40′E

Arsi Negele is a woreda in Oromia Region, Ethiopia. It is named after its administrative center, Arsi Negele. Part of the West Arsi Zone located in the Great Rift Valley, Arsi Negele is bordered on the south by Naannawa Shashamane and Kofale, on the southwest by Lake Shala which separates it from Shala, on the west by the Southern Nations, Nationalities and Peoples Region, on the north by East Shewa with which it shares the shores of Lakes Abijatta and Langano, and on the east by the Heban Arsi, Qore woreda and small portion by Arsi Zone.

== Overview ==
Except for the southeastern portion, the altitude of this woreda ranges from 1500 to 2300 meters above sea level; Gara Duro is the highest point. Rivers include the Gedamso, Lephis, Huluka, Awede Jitu, Awede Gudo, and Dadaba Gudo. A survey of the land in this woreda shows that 29.9% is arable or cultivable, 4.3% pasture, 5.2% forest, and the remaining 60.6% is considered swampy, degraded or otherwise unusable. The three major lakes of this woreda—Abijatta, Langano and Shala—cover about 32% of its area. Onion is an important cash crop.

Industry in the woreda includes 19 small industries employing 79 people, as well as 570 registered businessmen including 148 wholesalers 243 retailers and 179 service providers. Construction-grade sand and soda ash are mined in Arsi Negele. There were 33 Farmers Associations with 21,777 members and 12 Farmers Service Cooperatives with 11,430 members. Arsi Negele has 48 kilometers of dry-weather and 85 all-weather road, for an average road density of 95 kilometers per 1000 square kilometers. About 22% of the total population has access to drinking water.

== Demographics ==
The 2007 national census reported a total population for this woreda of 260,129, of whom 128,885 were men and 131,244 were women; 51,535 or 19.81% of its population were urban dwellers. The majority of the inhabitants were Muslim, with 68.86% of the population reporting they observed this belief, while 20.2% of the population said they practiced Ethiopian Orthodox Christianity, 8.99% of the population were Protestant, and 1.04% were Catholic.

Based on figures published by the Central Statistical Agency in 2005, this woreda has an estimated total population of 198,307, of whom 100,626 are men and 97,681 are women; 42,054 or 21.21% of its population are urban dwellers, which is less than the Zone average of 32.1%. With an estimated area of 1,400.16 square kilometers, Arsi Negele has an estimated population density of 141.6 people per square kilometer, which is less than the Zone average of 181.7.

The 1994 national census reported a total population for this woreda of 137,228, of whom 67,534 were men and 69,694 women; 23,512 or 17.13% of its population were urban dwellers at the time. The four largest ethnic groups reported in Arsi Negele were the Oromo (90.92%), the Amhara (2.69%), the Kambaata (2.73%), and the Soddo Gurage (1.08%); all other ethnic groups made up 2.58% of the population. Oromiffa was spoken as a first language by 86.65%, 8.89% spoke Amharic, and 2.44% spoke Kambaata; the remaining 2.02% spoke all other primary languages reported. The majority of the inhabitants were Muslim, with 70.94% of the population reporting they practiced that belief, while 22.29% of the population said they were Ethiopian Orthodox Christianity, and 5.34% were Protestant.
