= Gedeb Asasa =

Administrative division of Ethiopia

Coordinates: 7°10′N 39°10′E

Gedeb Hassasa is one of the Aanaas in the Oromia of Ethiopia. Part of the West Arsi Zone, Gedeb Hassasa is bordered on the south by the Dodola, on the west by Kofele, on the north west by Kore, and on the north and east by Bekoji. The administrative center of the woreda is Hassasa.

Ulrich Braukämper theorizes that the name "Gedeb" comes from a Hadiya subgroup mentioned in the Royal Chronicle of Zara Yaqob, where they are referred to as the "Gab". Braukämper has argued that the Hadiya kingdom prior to the Great Oromo migration in the 16th century included in this area, presenting a number of facts supporting his argument, as opposed to other experts who argue that it extended to the east.

== Overview ==
The altitude of this woreda ranges from 2200 to 4180 meters above sea level; Mount Kaka is the highest point in the woreda. Melka Wakena Dam, its power station and its lake of 816 hectares are located in this woreda. A survey of the land in this woreda shows that 76.9% is arable or cultivable, 17.3% pasture, 0.4% forest, and the remaining 5.4% is considered swampy, mountainous or otherwise unusable. Garadela, Arda Uta aka Aradayita and Temela are the three state farms in this woreda. Linseed is an important cash crop.

Industry in the woreda includes two edible oil mills, four flour factory, one purified water factory, 22 grain mills and one brick factory employing 104 people, rock quarries, as well as 722 registered businesses which include 284 wholesalers, 216 retailers and 222 service providers. There were 25 Farmers Associations with 21,373 members and 4 Farmers Service Cooperatives with 4270 members. Gedeb has 46 kilometers of dry-weather and 78 of all-weather road, for an average of road density of 108.8 kilometers per 1000 square kilometers. About 42.5% of the total population has access to drinking water.

In the 1970s, J. Desmond Clark of the University of California excavated a Paleolithic site in this woreda, located on the upper reaches of the Shabelle River.

== Demographics ==
The 2007 national census reported a total population for this woreda of 186,907, of whom 92,471 were men and 94,436 were women; 20,667 or 11.06% of its population were urban dwellers. The majority of the inhabitants were Muslim, with 80.68% of the population reporting they observed this belief, while 17.89% of the population said they practiced Ethiopian Orthodox Christianity, and 1.31% of the population were Protestant.

Based on figures published by the Central Statistical Agency in 2005, this woreda has an estimated total population of 169,940, of whom 86,633 are men and 83,307 are women; 19,506 or 11.48% of its population are urban dwellers, which is less than the Zone average of 12.3%. With an estimated area of 1,139.38 square kilometers, Gedeb has an estimated population density of 149.2 people per square kilometer, which is greater than the Zone average of 132.2.

The 1994 national census reported a total population for this woreda of 120,382, of whom 59,146 were men and 61,236 women; 10,903 or 9.06% of its population were urban dwellers at the time. The two largest ethnic groups reported in Gedeb were the Oromo (93.69%), and the Amhara (4.6%); all other ethnic groups made up 1.11% of the population. Oromiffa was spoken as a first language by 93.03%, and 6.51% spoke Amharic; the remaining 0.46% spoke all other primary languages reported. The majority of the inhabitants were Muslim, with 77.87% of the population having reported they practiced that belief, while 21.76% of the population said they professed Ethiopian Orthodox Christianity.
