= West Arsi Zone =

Zone in Oromia Region of Ethiopia

West Arsi Zone Arsii Dhihaa
- Zone
- Interactive map of West Arsi Zone
- Country: Ethiopia
- Region: Oromia
- Capital: Shashamane

Map of the regions and zones of Ethiopia

West Arsi (Oromo: Arsii Lixaa/Dhihaa) is a zone in the Oromia Region of Ethiopia. This zone is named after a subgroup of the Oromo, who inhabit it. It covers an area of 11,776.72 km^{2}, divided into 12 districts (weredas). The population was officially estimated at 2,929,894 in mid 2022. The administrative center of this zone is Shashamane, with an estimated 208,368 inhabitants in mid 2022; other towns in this zone (with estimated populations in mid 2022) include Arsi Negele (98,114) in Arsi Negele District, Dodola (43,186) in Dodola District, Asassa (42,867) in Gedeb Asasa District, Kofele (27,948) in Kofele District, and Adaba (25,098) in Adaba District.

== Demographics ==
Based on the 2007 Census conducted by the Central Statistical Agency of Ethiopia (CSA), this Zone has a total population of 1,964,038, of whom 973,743 are men and 990,295 women. 272,084 or 13.85% of population are urban inhabitants. A total of 387,143 households were counted in this Zone, which results in an average of 5.01 persons to a household, and 369,533 housing units. The two largest ethnic groups reported in West Arsi were the Oromo (88.52%) and the Amhara (3.98%); all other ethnic groups made up 7.5% of the population. Oromo was spoken as a first language by 87.34% and 6.46% spoke Amharic; the remaining 6.2% spoke all other primary languages reported. The majority of the inhabitants were Muslim, with 80.34% of the population having reported they practiced that belief, while 11.04% of the population professed Ethiopian Orthodox Christianity and 7.02% of the population professed Protestantism. The population was officially estimated at 2,929,894 in mid 2022, comprising 1,446,807 males and 1,483,087 females.
