= Florida International University =

Public university in Westchester, Florida, US

- Motto: Spes Scientia Facultas (Latin)
- Motto in English: "Hope, Knowledge, Opportunity"
- Type: Public research university
- Established: 1965; 61 years ago
- Founder: Florida Legislature
- Parent institution: State University System of Florida
- Accreditation: SACS
- Academic affiliations: CUMU; GCU; ORAU; USU; sea-grant; space-grant
- Endowment: $380.1 million (2025)
- President: Jeanette Nuñez
- Provost: Elizabeth M. Bejar
- Students: 55,811 (fall 2025)
- Undergraduates: 46,249 (fall 2025)
- Postgraduates: 9,562 (fall 2025)
- Location: Westchester, Florida (Note: located in the suburban Miami-Dade County unincorporated community of Westchester.), United States; 25.757°N 80.374°W
- Campus: 587.1 acres (237.6 ha); Large suburb
- Other campuses and centers: Biscayne Bay; Downtown Miami/Brickell; Islamorada; Miami Beach; Miramar; Port St. Lucie; Washington; Westchester; Genoa
- Newspaper: PantherNOW
- Colors: Blue and gold
- Nickname: Panthers
- Sporting affiliations: NCAA Division I FBS – CUSA; The American
- Mascot: Roary the Panther
- Website: fiu.edu

Florida International University (FIU) is a public research university with its main campus in Westchester, Florida, United States. Founded in 1965 by the Florida Legislature, the school opened to students in 1972. It is a constituent part of the State University System of Florida and one of four state-designated Preeminent State Research Universities.

FIU is classified as a Carnegie "R1: Doctoral Universities – Very high research activity" institution. It has 11 colleges and more than 40 centers, facilities, labs, and institutes that offer more than 200 programs of study. It has an annual budget of over $1.7 billion and an annual economic impact of over $5 billion. The university is accredited by the Southern Association of Colleges and Schools (SACS).

FIU's intercollegiate sports teams, the FIU Panthers, compete in National Collegiate Athletic Association (NCAA) Division I and the Conference USA (C-USA). The varsity sports teams have won five athletic championships and Panther athletes have won various individual NCAA national championships.

== History ==
In 1943, state senator Ernest R. Graham (father of future Florida governor and U.S. senator Bob Graham) initially proposed to the state legislature the establishment of a public university in Miami-Dade County. His bill did not pass, but he persisted in presenting his proposal to colleagues, advising them of the county's need for a state university. He felt the establishment of a public university was necessary to serve the city's growing population.

In 1964, Senate Bill 711 was introduced by Florida senator Robert M. Haverfield. It instructed the state Board of Education and the Board of Regents to begin planning for the development of the state university. The bill was signed into law by then-governor W. Haydon Burns in June 1965. FIU's founding president, Chuck Perry, was appointed by the board of regents in July 1969, at which time the institution was named Florida International University. At 32 years old, the new president was the youngest in the history of the State University System and, at the time, the youngest university president in the country. Perry recruited three co-founders, Butler Waugh, Donald McDowell, and Nick Sileo. Former Miami Herald publisher and Knight Ridder chairman Alvah Chapman, Jr., used his civic standing and media power to assist the effort. In the 1980s, Chapman became chair of the FIU Foundation Board of Trustees.

The founders located the campus on the site of the original Tamiami Airport (not related to the later Kendall-Tamiami Airport) on the Tamiami Trail (U.S. Route 41) between Southwest 107th and 117th Avenues, just east of where the West Dade Expressway (now the Homestead Extension of Florida's Turnpike) was being planned. The abandoned airport's air traffic control tower became FIU's first building, with Perry's office on the first floor. It originally had no telephones, no drinking water, and no furniture. Perry decided that the tower should never be destroyed, and it remains on campus, where it is now known variously as the "Veterans Office," "Ivory Tower," the "Tower Building," or the "Public Safety Tower," and is the former location of the FIU Police Department.

The groundbreaking for the Tamiami campus was held in January 1971. U Thant received FIU's first honorary degree.

=== Miami-Dade County's public university ===
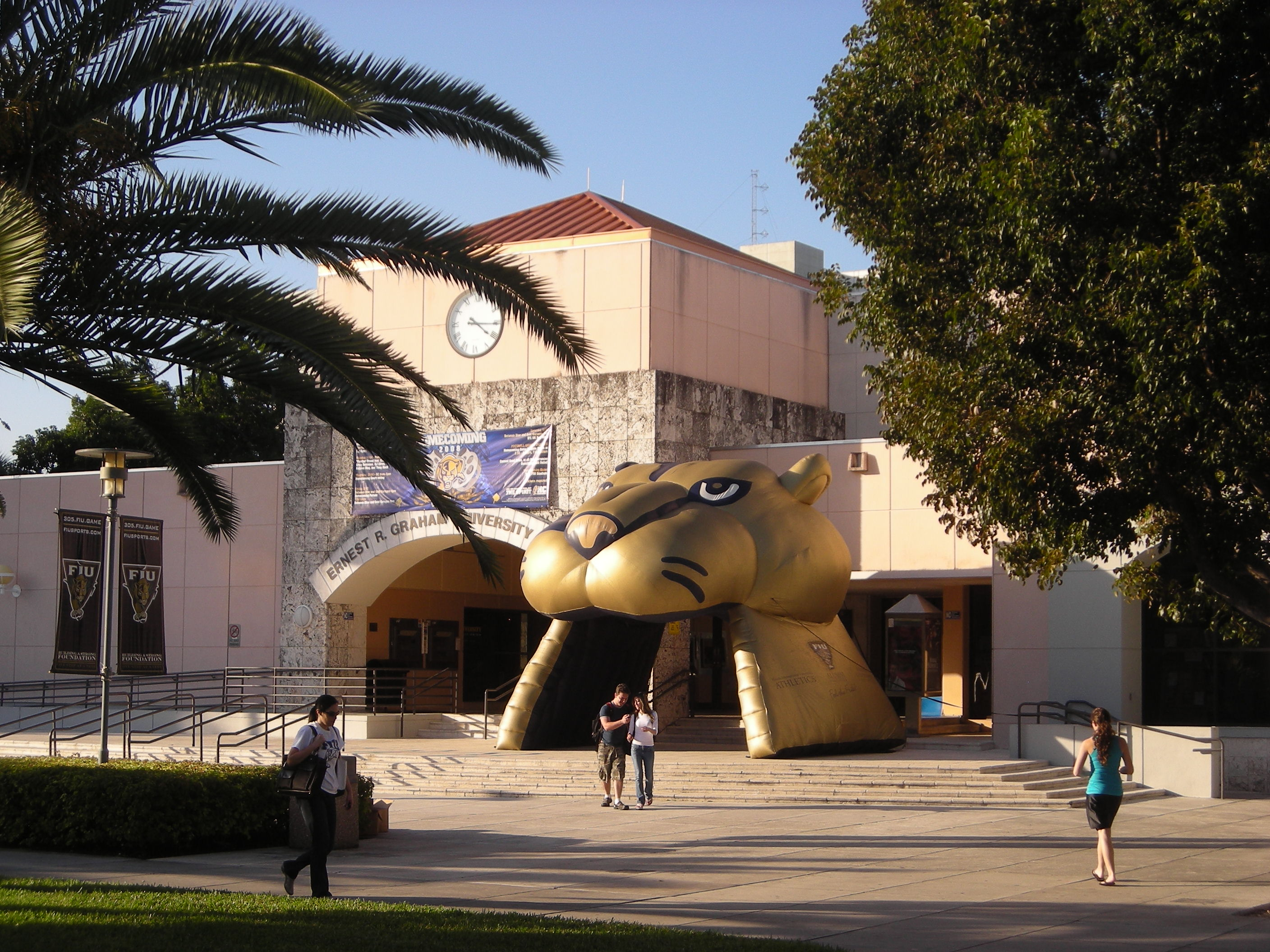
The Graham Center, FIU's student union; over 3.5 million people walk through the Graham Center every year, making it the heart of student life at FIU

In September 1972, 5,667 students entered FIU, the largest opening day enrollment at the time. Eighty percent of the student body had just graduated from Dade County Junior College (now Miami-Dade College). A typical student entering FIU was 25 years old and attending school full-time while holding down a full-time job. Forty-three percent were married. Negotiations with the University of Miami and Dade County Junior College led FIU to open as an upper-division only school; Perry's vision foresaw a "no gimmicks" institution with no student housing. Lower-division classes were added nine years later.

The first commencement, in June 1973, took place in the reading room of the ground floor of Primera Casa—the only place on campus big enough for the ceremony. More than 1,500 family members and friends watched FIU's first class of 191 graduates receive their diplomas. By 1975, after seven years at the helm, Perry felt he had accomplished his goal and left the university to become president and publisher of the Sunday newspaper magazine Family Weekly (later USA Weekend), one of the country's largest magazines. When he left, more than 10,000 students were attending classes and the campus had five major buildings with a sixth planned.

=== Crosby and Wolfe: 1976–1986 ===
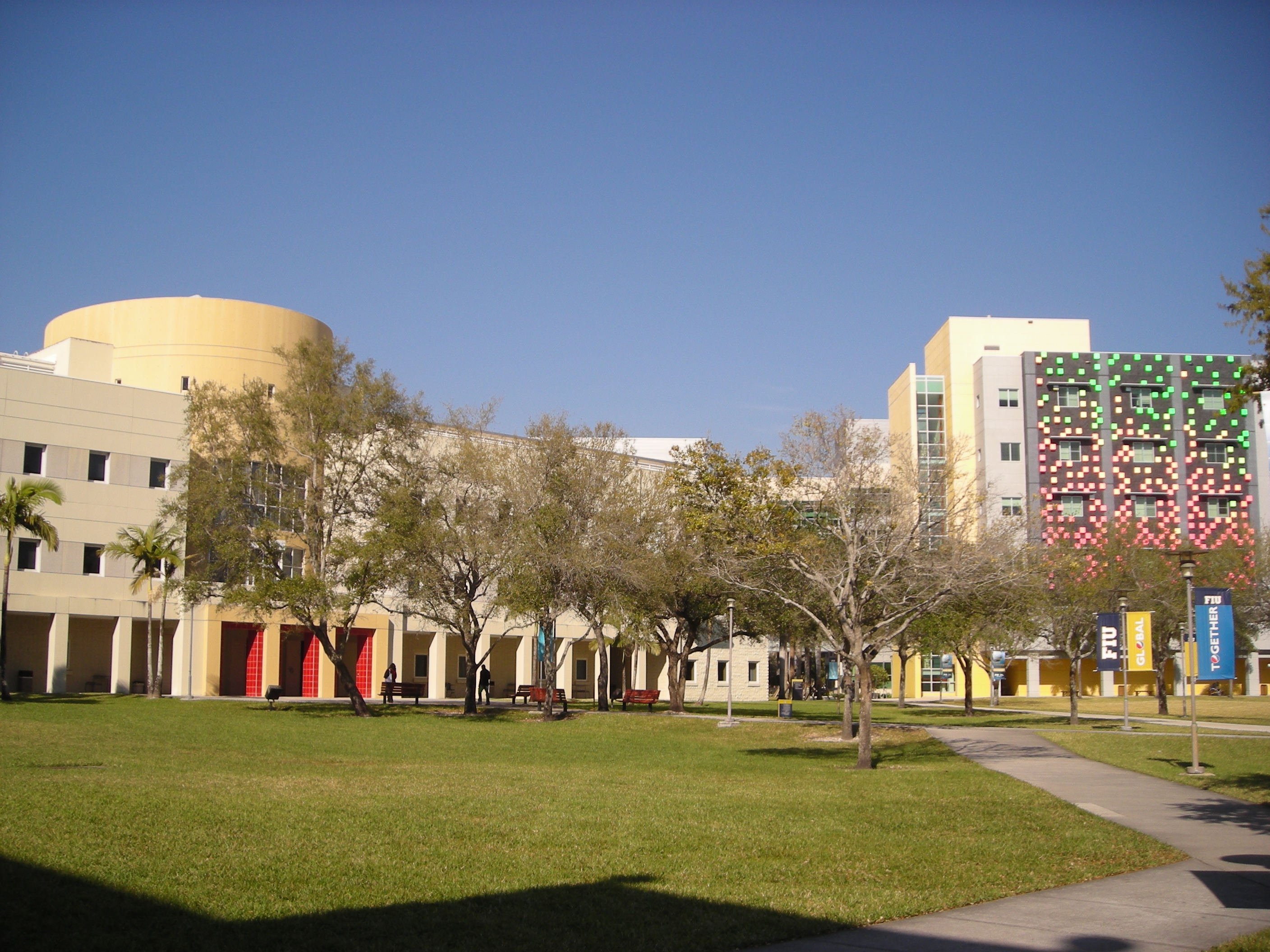
Chemistry & Physics building

Harold Crosby, the university's second president and the founding president of the University of West Florida in Pensacola, agreed in 1976 to serve a three-year "interim" term. Under his leadership, FIU's North Miami Campus (which was officially renamed the Bay Vista Campus in 1980, the North Miami Campus in 1987, the North Campus in 1994, and the Biscayne Bay Campus in 2000)—located on the former Interama site on Biscayne Bay—was opened in 1977. State senator Jack Gordon was instrumental in securing funding for the development of the campus. President Crosby emphasized the university's international character, prompting the launching of new programs with an international focus and the recruitment of faculty from the Caribbean and Latin America. President Crosby's resignation in January 1979 triggered the search for a "permanent" president.

Gregory Baker Wolfe, a former United States diplomat and then-president of Portland State University, became FIU's third president, serving from 1979 to 1986. During his tenure, the institution continued to grow; it became a four-year institution, though Wolfe was criticized for not hiring enough minorities and for leading a weak private fundraising effort. After stepping down as president, Wolfe taught in the university's international relations department. The student union on the Biscayne Bay Campus is named in his honor.

=== Maidique presidency and expansion ===
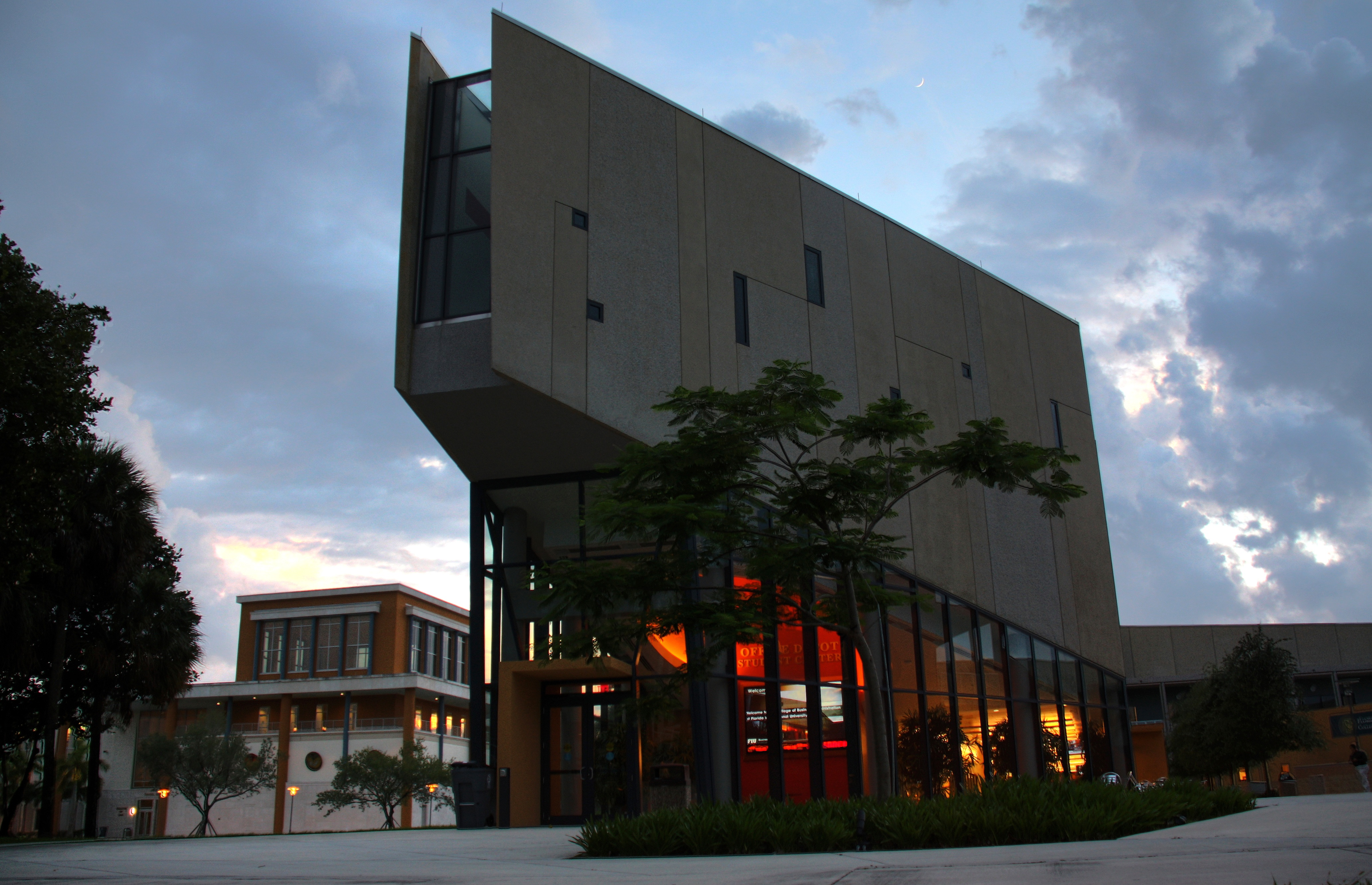
FIU College of Business Complex

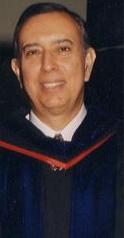
Modesto A. Maidique, 4th president

Modesto A. Maidique assumed the presidency at FIU in 1986, becoming the fourth in the university's history and the first Hispanic leader of any of Florida's state universities. Maidique graduated with a Bachelor of Science, Master of Science, and PhD in Electrical Engineering from Massachusetts Institute of Technology (MIT), before joining the private sector. He held academic appointments from MIT, Harvard and Stanford Universities, and has been named to several US presidential boards and committees.

Under his leadership, FIU heralded in an era of unprecedented growth and prestige, with all facets of the university undergoing major transformations. Physically, the university tripled in size and its enrollment grew to nearly 40,000. During his 23 years as president, the school established the Herbert Wertheim College of Medicine, the FIU College of Law, the FIU School of Architecture, and the Robert Stempel School of Public Health. Also during his tenure, the endowment grew from less than $2 million to over $100 million.

During Maidique's tenure, the university added 22 new doctoral programs. Research expenditures grew from about $6 million to nearly $110 million as defined by the National Science Foundation. In 2000, FIU attained the highest ranking in the Carnegie Foundation classification system, that of "Doctoral/Research University-Extensive." FIU's faculty has engaged in research and holds far-reaching expertise in reducing morbidity and mortality from cancer, HIV/AIDS, substance abuse, diabetes and other diseases, and change the approaches to the delivery of health care by medical, public health, nursing and other healthcare professionals, hurricane mitigation, climate change, nano-technologies, forensic sciences, and the development of biomedical devices. The arts also flourished while Maidique was at the helm, with the university acquiring The Wolfsonian-FIU Museum on Miami Beach and building the Patricia and Phillip Frost Art Museum on its main campus. In athletics, FIU made inroads in becoming a powerhouse athletic university during Maidique's time as president; he unilaterally changed the mascot from the Sunblazers to the Golden Panthers early in his tenure, and he championed the eventual establishment of an NCAA football program. Finally, the school earned membership into Phi Beta Kappa, the nation's oldest honor society.

Maidique was the second longest-serving research university president in the nation. Now President Emeritus, he serves as the Alvah H. Chapman, Jr., Eminent Scholar Chair in Leadership, and Professor of Management at FIU.

=== Rosenberg presidency ===
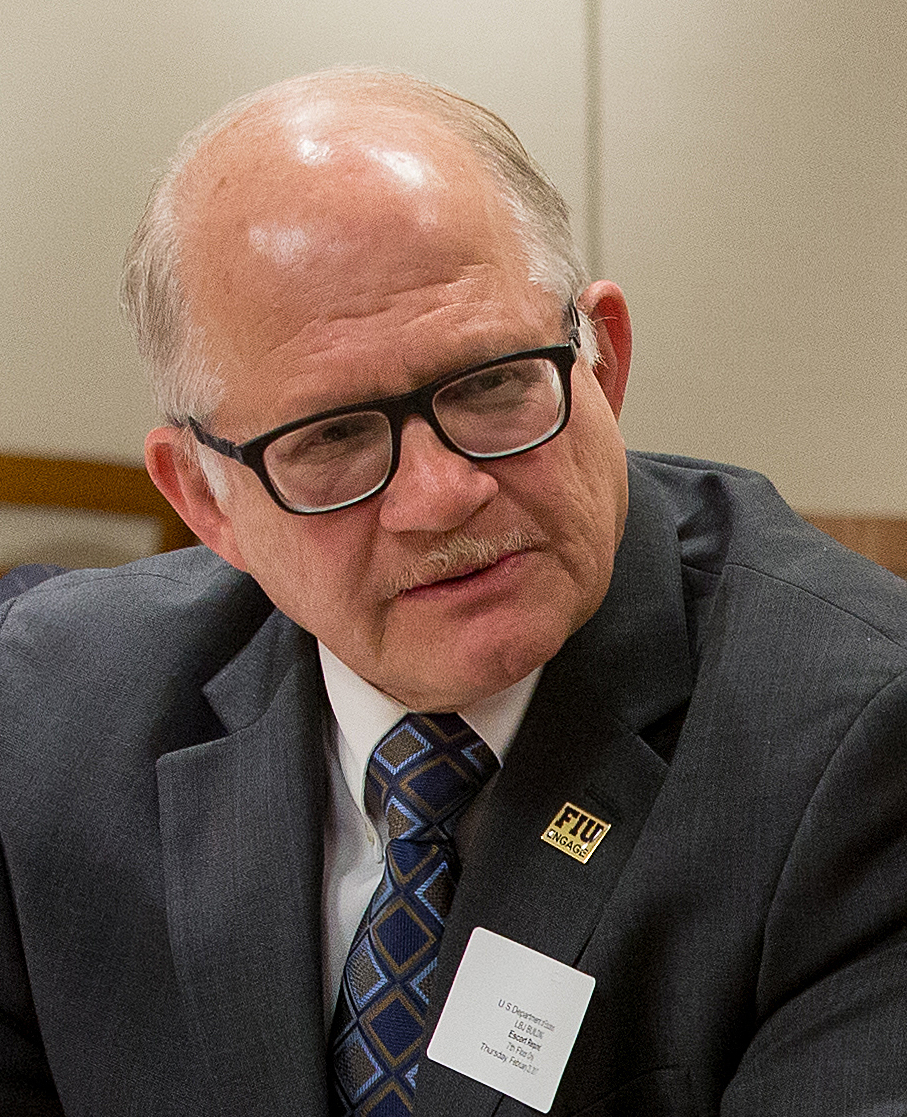
Mark B. Rosenberg, 5th President

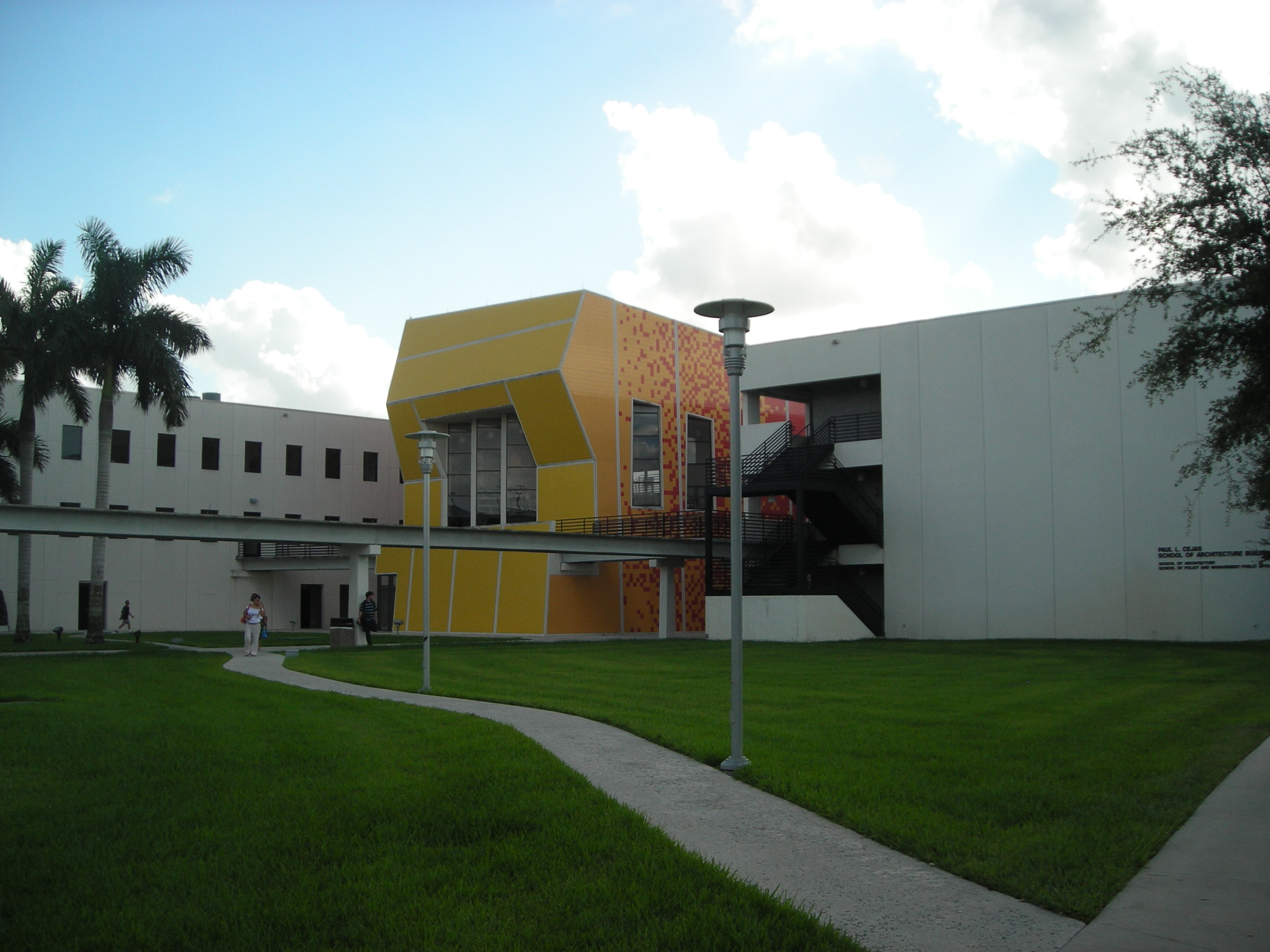
Paul Cejas School of Architecture building

On November 14, 2008, Maidique announced that he would be stepping down and asked FIU's board of trustees to begin the search of a new president. He said he would remain president until a new one was found. On April 25, 2009, Mark B. Rosenberg was selected to become FIU's fifth president. He signed a five-year contract with the board of trustees. On August 29, 2009, Rosenberg became FIU's fifth president.

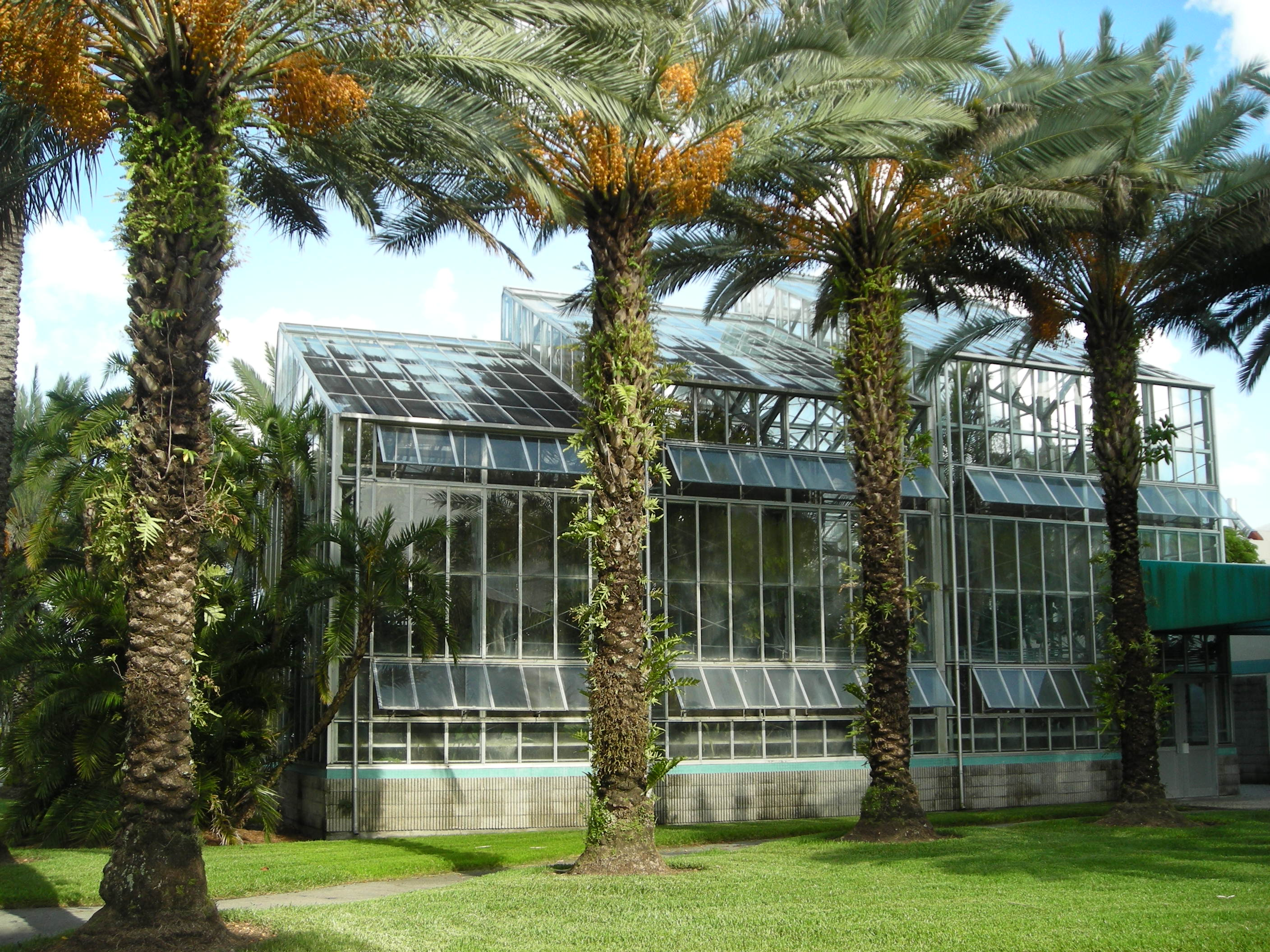
The Wertheim Conservatory houses many rare species of plants and foliage.

Having begun as a two-year upper division university, FIU has grown into a much larger traditional university and serves international students. More than $600 million has been invested in campus construction, with the addition of new residence halls, the FIU Stadium, recreation center, student center, and Greek life mansions, as well as the fielding of the Division I-A Golden Panthers football team in 2002.

Since 1986, the university established its School of Architecture, College of Law and College of Medicine (named the Herbert Wertheim College of Medicine in 1999 after Herbert Wertheim donated $20 million to the college, which was matched by state funds and is the largest donation in the university's history), and acquired the historic Wolfsonian-FIU Museum in Miami Beach. FIU now emphasizes research as a major component of its mission and is now classed as a "very high research activity" university under the Carnegie Classification of Institutions of Higher Education. Sponsored research funding (grants and contracts) from external sources for the year 2007–2008 totaled some $110 million. FIU has a budget of over $649 million. The Florida International University School of Hospitality & Tourism Management collaborated with the Ministry of Education of the People's Republic of China to work on preparations for the 2008 Summer Olympics. FIU was the only university in the United States invited to do so.

In December 2013, it was announced Royal Caribbean was building a $20 million 130,000 sq. ft. training facility for its performers at the school. The facility opened in March 2015. The complex serves architecture, art, and hospitality students and includes lighting, set design, marketing, and other internship and training opportunities. On March 15, 2018, a newly constructed pedestrian bridge collapsed outside the university, resulting in six fatalities. On May 6, 2020, Florida Department of Transportation announced plans to design and rebuild the bridge.

Rosenberg suddenly resigned from the university effective January 21, 2022, citing deteriorating health conditions of his wife. Just a week later it was revealed that he stepped down because of allegations that he had made advances to a younger female employee, "causing discomfort", and creating a hostile work environment. Rosenberg is currently a professor of political science and international relations at the Steven J. Green School of International and Public Affairs at FIU.

=== Jessell presidency ===
Rosenberg was succeeded by Kenneth A. Jessell as president, previously FIU's chief financial officer and senior vice president for finance and administration. Jessell was selected as FIU's sixth president on October 17, 2022 by FIU's board of trustees and was confirmed by the Florida Board of Governors on November 9, 2022.

In April 2024, students at Florida International University started protesting and set up a "liberated zone" in support of Palestinians in Gaza, joining other campuses nationwide. Florida Governor De Santis strongly condemned the protests and threatened to deport foreign students. The ACLU of Florida weighed in with a statement supporting the students' right to protest. FIU students cited the government's threats for staying away from the protests. The protesters called for an end to "the siege on Gaza” and U.S. funding and arms to Israel.

Jessell's contract ended in 2025. He was replaced by Florida's lieutenant governor and FIU alumna Jeanette Nuñez as interim president on February 17, 2025.

In March 2026, the university took disciplinary action against several students who participated in a peaceful protest and violated the university's policy against "expressive activities" indoors. The university required them to record two-minute videos to reflect on the policy and their conduct. In response, the students successfully sued the university for violating their First Amendment rights of free expression.

== Campus ==
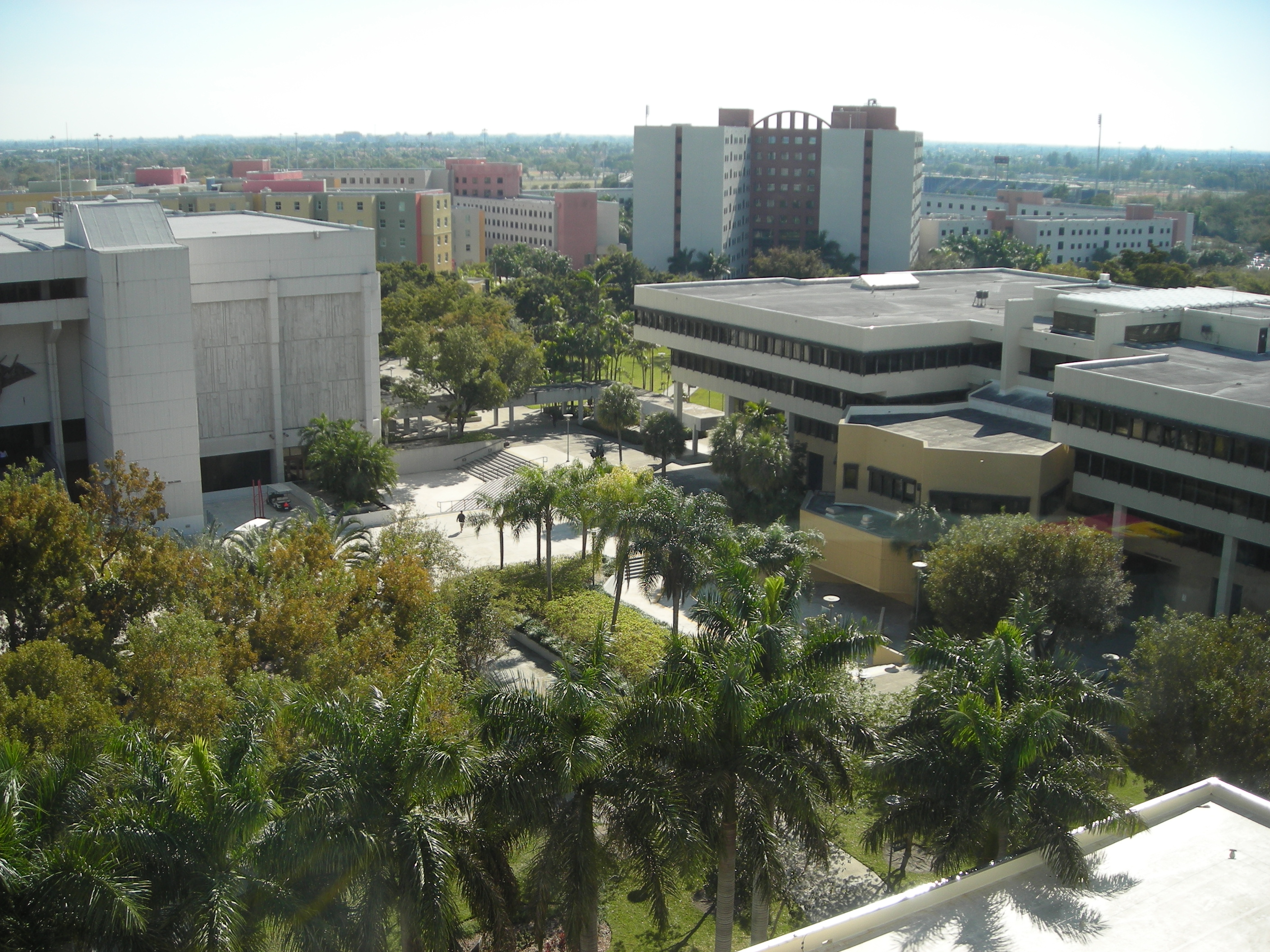
View of the campus towards Primera Casa and Deuxième Maison. The campus' oldest buildings are classic examples of Brutalist architecture.

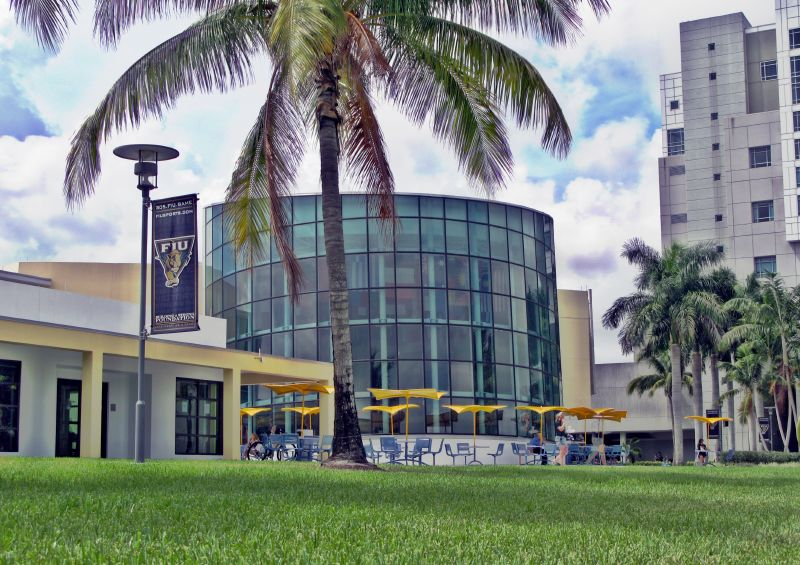
FIU Graham Center Atrium

Florida International's 344-acre (139 ha) campus is in the University Park neighborhood in the census-designated place of Westchester in an unincorporated area of western Miami-Dade County, Florida. The Modesto A. Maidique Campus ("MMC")—formerly called University Park but renamed in 2009—encompasses 344 acres (1.39 km^{2}). The MMC houses almost all the university's colleges and schools as well as all the administrative offices and main university facilities. MMC is also home to the Ronald Reagan Presidential House, the home of FIU's president; the Wertheim Performing Arts Center; the Frost Art Museum; the International Hurricane Research Center; and the university's athletic facilities, such as FIU Stadium, FIU Arena, and the FIU Baseball Stadium.

The postal address of the Modesto Maidique campus has a "postal city" of Miami, and the ZIP code is 33199, but the campus is physically in the Westchester census-designated place as of the 2020 U.S. census. In the 1990 U.S. census it was in the Olympia Heights CDP. In the 2000 U.S. census and the 2010 U.S. census the campus was in the University Park CDP.

The campus site was originally used for a general aviation airport, Tamiami Airport (not to be confused with Kendall-Tamiami Airport), which operated from the 1940s until 1967, when it relocated. The airport had three runways and was used for pilot training, among other purposes. The original campus was named the Tamiami Campus, after the nearby Tamiami Trail highway and the former airport, until being designated the University Park Campus in 1987.

Until the early 1990s, the runways, parking ramp, and other features of Tamiami Airport were still visible on campus and clearly discernible in aerial photos. Construction removed all these features, and only the University Tower remains as a memory of the university's past. University Park is a heavily vegetated campus, with many lakes, a 15-acre nature preserve, and a palm arboretum, with over 90 buildings. As of 2009, construction at University Park includes the Nursing and Health Sciences Building, the School of International and Public Affairs Building, and a fifth parking garage.

On June 12, 2009, FIU's board of trustees voted unanimously to rename the University Park campus the Modesto Maidique Campus; the university had considered naming the law school in his honor but decided not to because that would preclude a future charitable donation to name the school. The change created a large backlash from the FIU community, as many felt it unfitting to name the campus after him. There was a campaign by FIU students and alumni to revert the change and keep the name University Park. A Facebook group, "No to Maidique's Campus", with over 2,000 supporters, made national news in newspapers, on TV, and in collegiate magazines.

=== Engineering Center ===
Five blocks north of Modesto A. Maidique is the 38-acre (15.3 ha) Engineering Center, which houses part of the College of Engineering and Computing and is the home of FIU's Motorola Nanofabrication Research Facility. The Engineering Center is serviced by the CATS Shuttle, FIU's student buses, which run throughout the day on weekdays connecting the two parts of campus.

=== Main Modesto A. Maidique buildings ===
- Campus Support Complex, 1999
- Chemistry & Physics Building, 1990
- College of Business Complex, 2008
- College of Engineering & Computing Phase I, Under construction (est. completion Apr. 2024)
- College of Health Building, 1989
- Deuxième Maison, 1973
- Engineering Center, 1996
- Engineering and Computer Sciences Building, 1990
- Everglades Hall, 2002
- FIU Arena, 1986
- FIU Stadium, 1995
- Frost Art Museum, 1977 (new building: 2007)
- Graham Center, 1974
- Green Library, 1975
- Health and Life Sciences Phases I and II, 2000
- Labor Center, 1994

- Lakeview Hall North and South, 2006
- Management And New Growth Opportunities, 2015
- Management and Advanced Research Center, 2002
- National Hurricane Center/National Weather Service, 1995
- Nursing and Health Sciences Building, 2009
- Owa Ehan, 1975
- Panther Hall, 1996
- Parkview Hall, 2013
- Paul Cejas School of Architecture Building, 2003
- Primera Casa, 1969
- Rafael Diaz-Balart Law Building, 2006
- Recreation Center, 2005
- Ronald Reagan House, 2001

- Ryder Business Building, 1992
- School of International and Public Affairs Phase I, 2010
- School of International and Public Affairs Phase II, 2023
- Science Classroom Complex, 2012
- Stocker AstroScience Center, 2013
- Tamiami Hall, 2022
- Trish and Dan Bell Chapel, Under construction (est. completion 2025)
- University Health Services Complex, 1992
- University Apartments, 1986
- University Towers, 2000
- Viertes Haus, 1975
- Wertheim Conservatory, 1991
- Wertheim Performing Arts Center, 1996
- Ziff Education Building, 1995

Carlos Finlay Elementary School, of the Miami-Dade County Public Schools, is on the FIU Maidique Campus. The National Weather Service Miami Office is also on FIU property. Both Finlay ES and the Hurricane Center are subleased.

=== Biscayne Bay Campus ===
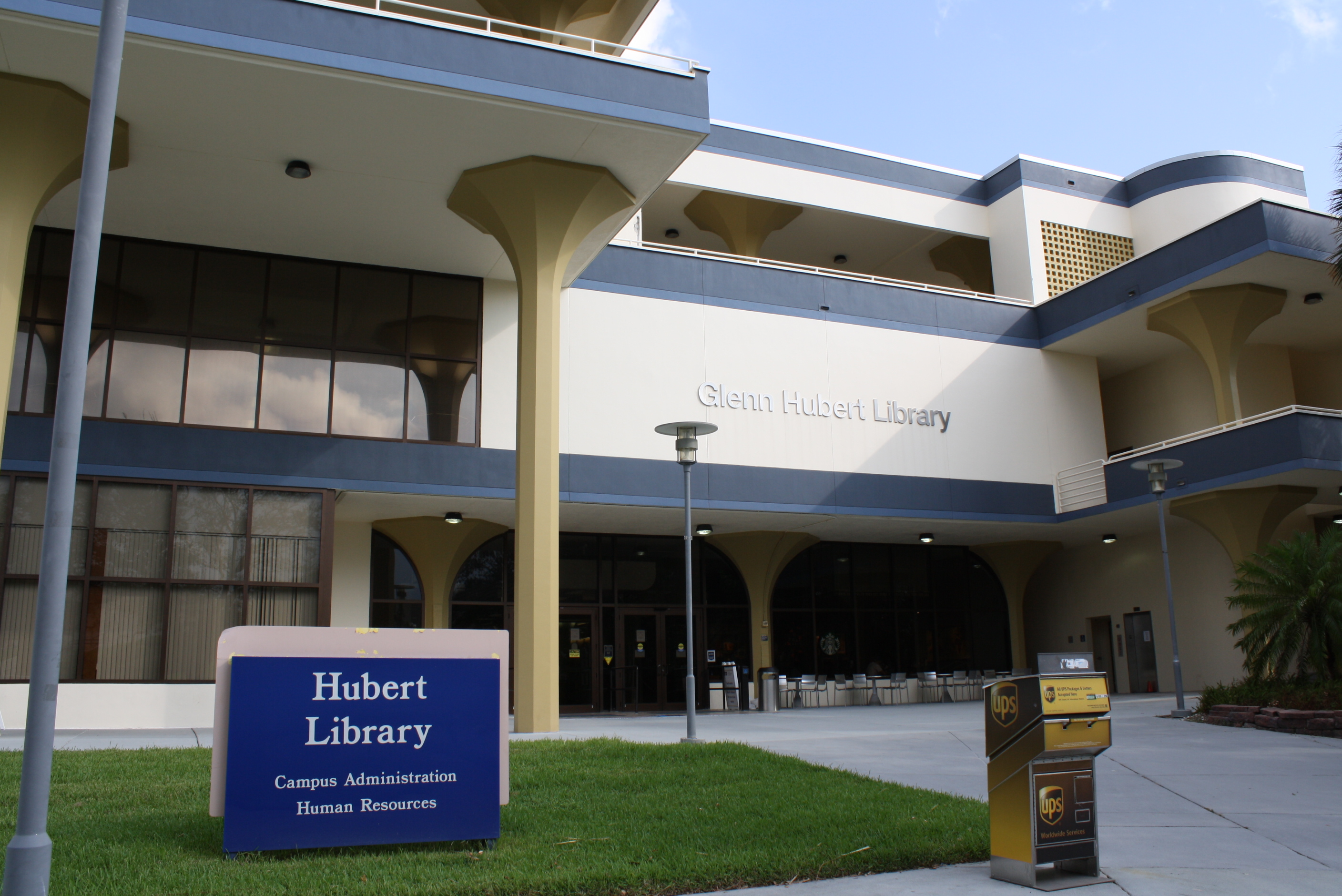
The Glenn Hubert Library at Florida International University's Biscayne Bay Campus

The Biscayne Bay Campus (BBC) in North Miami is Florida International's 200-acre (91 ha) waterfront branch campus. It was opened in 1977 by Harold Crosby and occupies land, directly on the bay and adjacent to the Oleta River State Park, with which FIU has a research partnership. Access to these resources inspired the creation of a marine biology program on the Biscayne Bay Campus, which has become one of the university's most recognized programs. The Biscayne Bay Campus also houses the School of Hospitality & Tourism Management, the School of Journalism and Mass Communication, the Aquatic Center, and the Kovens Conference Center. The Golden Panther Express, FIU's student buses, connect the main campus and the Biscayne Bay Campus throughout the day on weekdays.

On the Biscayne Bay Campus, FIU offers housing through Bayview Student Living apartments. BBC's first on-campus new housing in 30+ years houses 408 students in a high rise overlooking Biscayne Bay. Through FIU's Panther Express Shuttle, current students travel free between campuses.

=== Regional centers ===
FIU also has other smaller regional centers located throughout South Florida in both Miami-Dade County and Broward County, serving the local communities in research, continuing studies, and in culture. In Miami-Dade County, there are four regional FIU facilities, the Downtown Miami Center, the Wolfsonian-FIU Museum in Miami Beach (Washington Avenue and 10th St), the FIU-Florida Memorial research center in Miami Gardens, and a research site in Homestead.

==== FIU at I-75 ====
The FIU at I-75 academic center is a satellite campus located in Miramar, which borders Pembroke Pines and the southernmost portion of Interstate 75 in Broward County. It finished construction in 2014 and is used to satisfy overwhelming demand from Broward County students and shares a building with Broward College. The campus houses an 89,000-sqft. complex and offers courses and programs from the College of Arts & Sciences, College of Business, College of Education, and the College of Engineering & Computing. This campus is also equipped with offices, a computer lab, student lounges, and study spaces for students.

==== Downtown Miami Center ====
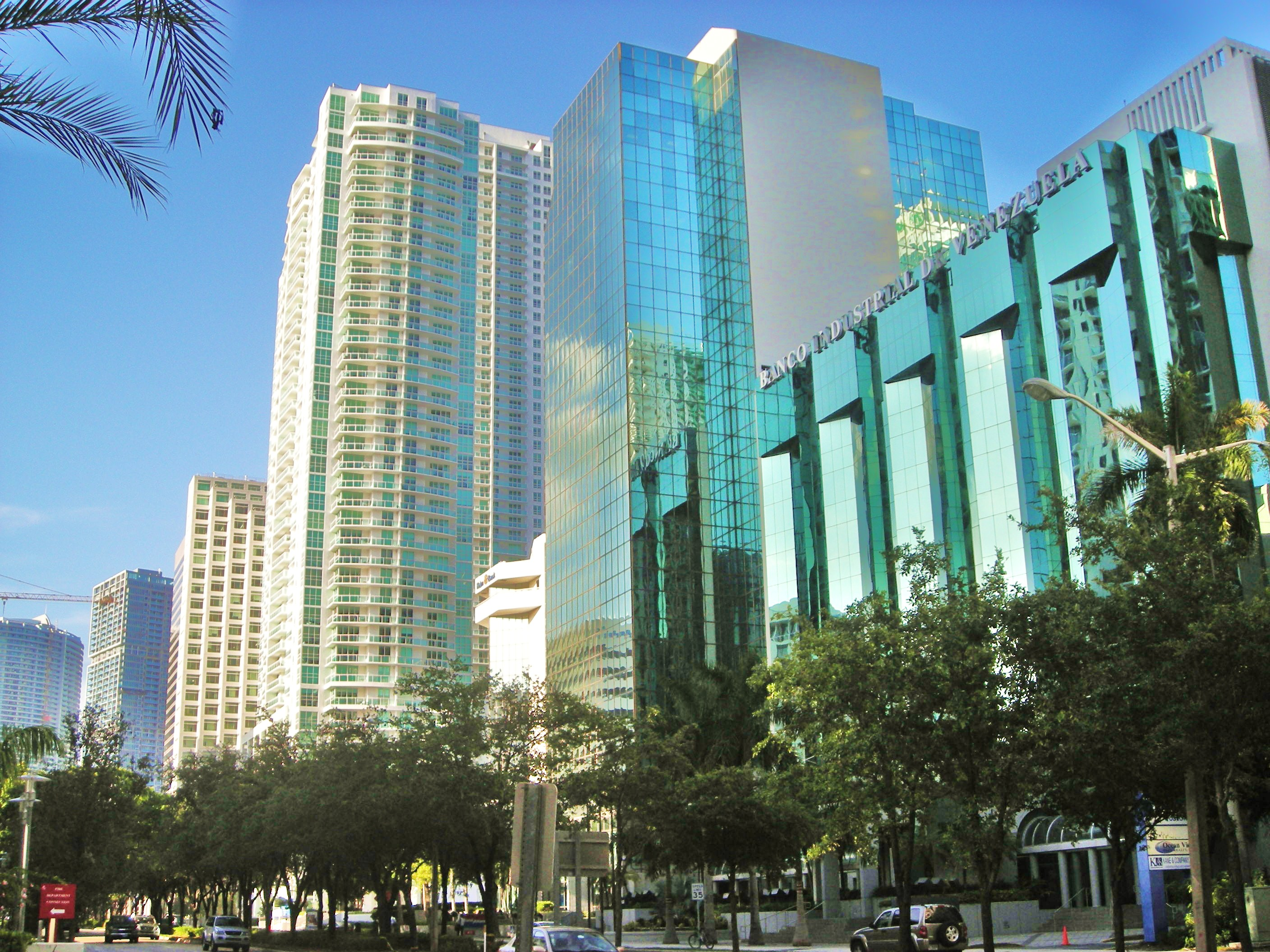
1101 Brickell Avenue, home of FIU's Downtown Miami campus

FIU has a center on Brickell Avenue in Downtown Miami at 1101 Brickell Avenue dubbed "FIU Downtown on Brickell". FIU's College of Business Administration has had classes at the Burdines Building on Flagler Street and the Metropolitan Center had offices at 150 SE 2nd Ave since 2004. In August 2011, FIU expanded its Downtown center to 1101 Brickell with the expansion of course offerings for the College of Business Administration and the School of International and Public Affairs, as well as with FIU's research center, the Metropolitan Center. Most programs in Downtown are graduate-level evening courses geared for Downtown professionals and residents. As of Spring 2011, there were approximately 500 students enrolled at the Downtown center, with plans to grow the center to over 2,000 students by 2021.

==== Global Forensic and Justice Center, Largo ====
Founded in 2018, it combines two decades of experience to engage the forensic science and criminal justice industries from the crime scene to the courtroom. Located at: Bryan Dairy Road, Largo, Florida .

== Organization and administration ==
FIU belongs to the 12-campus State University System of Florida and is one of Florida's primary graduate research universities, awarding over 3,400 graduate and professional degrees annually. It offers 191 programs of study with more than 280 majors in 23 colleges and schools. FIU offers many graduate programs, including architecture, business administration, engineering, law, and medicine, offering 81 master's degrees, 34 doctoral degrees, and three professional degrees.

=== Student government ===
The Student Government Association presides over and funds the over 300 student clubs, organizations, and honor societies at the university, and has an annual operating budget of about $20 million. The Student Government Association is split into three branches. The executive branch consists of the student body president and vice president, who are chosen in a university-wide election, as well as the governor of the Biscayne Bay Campus, who is chosen in an election of students pertaining to that campus. The executive branch also contains the cabinet. The legislative branch consists of the Student Body Senate. The judicial branch consists of the Supreme Court. The student body president serves as a member of the FIU Board of Trustees, while the student body vice president serves as a member of the FIU Foundation's board of directors.

The Student Government oversees several agencies which provide programming to the student body: the Homecoming Council, the Student Programming Council, Panther Power, and the Registered Student Organizations Council, which is responsible for registering the over 300 student organizations and distributing funding allocated by the Student Government. Panther Power is the student spirit group, and it can be seen in all FIU athletic events alongside the band, the Dazzlers dance team, and the cheerleaders. In addition, the Student Government oversees several bureaus which provide community for identity groups on campus, including the Black Student Union and the Pride Student Union.

=== Presidents ===
President	Tenure
Charles Perry	1965–1976
Harold B. Crosby	1976–1979
Gregory Baker Wolfe	1979–1986
Modesto A. Maidique	1986–2009
Mark B. Rosenberg	2009–2022
Kenneth A. Jessell	2022–2025
Jeanette M. Nuñez	2025-

=== Colleges and schools ===
- College of Architecture and the Arts
  - School of Architecture
  - School of Communication and Journalism
  - School of Music
- College of Arts, Sciences and Education
  - School of Education and Human Development
  - School of Environment, Arts, and Society
  - School of Integrated Science and Humanity
- College of Business
  - Alvah H. Chapman Graduate School of Business
  - R. Kirk Landon Undergraduate School of Business

- College of Engineering and Computing
  - Knight Foundation School of Computing and Information Sciences
  - Moss School of Construction, Infrastructure and Sustainability
  - School of Universal Computing, Construction and Engineering Education
- College of Law
- Herbert Wertheim College of Medicine
- Nicole Wertheim College of Nursing and Health Sciences
- Robert Stempel College of Public Health and Social Work
- Chaplin School of Hospitality and Tourism Management
- Steven J. Green School of International and Public Affairs
- Honors College

== Academics ==
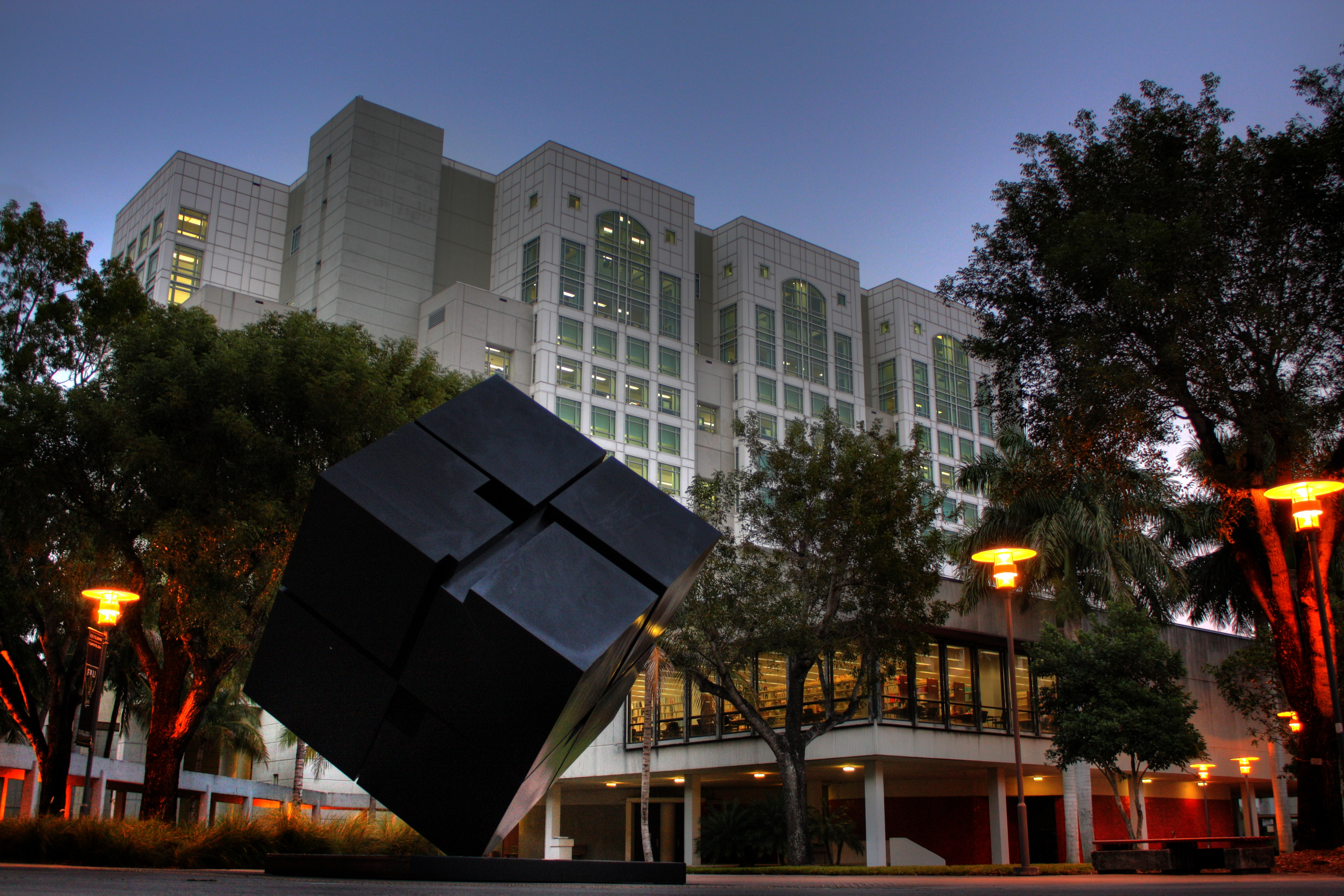
Marty's Cube formerly near the Green Library was removed in 2014, citing safety concerns

FIU offers 191 academic programs, 60 baccalaureate programs, 81 master's programs, three specialist programs, 34 doctoral programs, and 4 professional programs in 23 colleges and schools. In addition, 97% of the faculty have terminal degrees, and 50% currently have tenure at the university with a student/teacher ratio of 27:1.

In the early 2000s, emphasis at FIU was placed on growth in degree programs and student enrollment. Since 2005, however, student enrollment has been capped, and emphasis has been placed on improving the quality of the existing academic programs. With the addition of the College of Medicine, the demand for facilities and classroom space has greatly increased.

=== Tuition ===
For the 2019–2020 academic year, tuition costs are:

Undergraduate
$205.57 per credit hour for in-state students, and $618.87 per credit hour for out-of-state students. Total tuition/fees :$7,916 for in-state and $20,314 for out of state
Graduate
$455.64 per credit hour for in-state students, and $1,001.69 per credit hour for out-of-state students. Total tuition/fees :$9,600 for in-state and $19,428 for out of state
Law School (day)
$675.67 per credit hour for in-state students, and $1,101.87 per credit hour for out-of-state students. Total tuition/fees:$20,660 for in-state and $33,446 for out of state
Law School (night)
$506.77 per credit hour for in-state students, and $851.40 per credit hour for out-of-state students. Total tuition/fees:$15,593 for in-state and $25,932 for out of state

=== Admissions ===
Fall first-time freshman admission statistics
	2023	2022	2021	2020	2019	2018
Applicants	25,034	17,343	16,406	16,911	18,492	19,410
Admits	14,729	11,075	10,502	9,784	10,634	11,366
Enrolls	5,168	4,424	4,061	3,763	3,998	4,441
Admit rate	58.8%	63.9%	64.0%	57.9%	57.5%	58.6%
Yield rate	35.1%	39.9%	38.7%	38.5%	37.6%	39.1%
SAT composite*	1060–1240 (91%†)	1070–1240 (90%†)	1030–1220 (87%†)	1110–1260 (92%†)	1110–1280 (92%†)	1090–1260 (77%†)
ACT composite*	20–26 (9%†)	21–26 (10%†)	21–27 (13%†)	23–29 (8%†)	23–28 (8%†)	23–27 (23%†)
* middle 50% range † percentage of first-time freshmen who chose to submit

Florida International University students, numbering 54,085 in Fall 2023, come from more than 130 countries, and all 50 U.S. states. The ratio of women to men is 57:43, and 18.6 percent are graduate and professional students. Professional degree programs include Law, Medicine, Engineering, Business Administration, and Nursing.

The Fall 2023 incoming freshman class had an average 4.1 GPA, 1150 SAT score, and a 24 ACT score. 3% of these students were foreign nationals, while 74% were Hispanic Americans, 9% were Black Americans, 8% were White Americans, and 3% were Asian Americans. The freshman retention rate for 2021 was 100%. The most popular College by enrollment is the College of Arts and Sciences. For Fall 2021, 24,351 students applied for graduate admissions throughout the university. Of those, 8,043 (33.02%) were accepted. The Wertheim College of Medicine admitted 5.2% of its applicants, and the College of Law admitted 22%. Admission to the Wertheim College of Medicine is competitive, and the college has one of the highest number of applicants in the state, greater than the University of Florida. For Fall 2010, 3,606 students applied for 43 spots.

The FIU School of Architecture is the most competitive school in Florida, with the lowest admission rate in the state at 14% (2011). For Fall 2009, the School of Architecture received over 1,000 applications for the first-year Master of Architecture program, with 60 being accepted, giving the School of Architecture a 6% admissions rate. The average high school GPA for the freshman class in the School of Architecture was 3.98, also making it one of the most selective schools at FIU.

=== Enrollment ===
Undergraduate demographics as of Fall 2023
Race and ethnicity	Total
Hispanic	68%
Black	11%
White	9%
International student	7%
Asian	3%
Two or more races	2%
Unknown	1%
Economic diversity
Low-income (Note: The percentage of students who received an income-based federal Pell grant intended for low-income students.)	54%
Affluent (Note: The percentage of students who are a part of the American middle class at the bare minimum.)	46%

In 2024, nearly 3,800 FIU students (both undergraduate and graduate students) were recognized as international students. Of those, the most common countries of origin were China, Venezuela, India, Colombia, Saudi Arabia and Brazil. New York, New Jersey, and California have the most out-of-state students. Floridians make up 90% of the student population. Miami-Dade, Broward, Palm Beach, Hillsborough, and Orange County are the largest counties for in-state students.

University Park accounted for 87% of the student population and 94% of housing students. The Biscayne Bay Campus accounted for about 13% of the student population, mostly of lower-division undergraduates and students of the School of Hospitality & Tourism Management.

=== Rankings ===
Academic rankings

National
- Forbes: 138
- U.S. News & World Report: 97 (tie)
- Washington Monthly: 16
- WSJ/College Pulse: 29

Global
- ARWU: 501-600
- QS: =582
- THE: 401–500
- U.S. News & World Report: 504 (tie)

USNWR graduate school rankings
Business	110–143
Business: International Business	4
Business: Part-time MBA	102
Education	112
Engineering	92
Law	60
Medicine: Research	106
Medicine: Primary Care	102
Nursing: Master's	47
Nursing: Doctor of Nursing Practice	56

USNWR departmental rankings
Biological Sciences	203
Biostatistics	64
Chemistry	173
Clinical Psychology	101
Computer Science	110
Criminology	32
Earth Sciences	118
Economics	110
Engineering: Undergraduate	137
Fine Arts	178
Health Care Management	51
History	100
Nursing: BSN	96
Nursing-Anesthesia	88
Occupational Therapy	68
Physical Therapy	179
Physics	146
Political Science	109
Psychology	140
Public Affairs	62
Public Finance and Budgeting	24
Public Health	63
Rehabilitation Counseling	58
Social Work	72
Sociology	113
Speech-Language Pathology	146

In 2025, U.S. News & World Report ranked Florida International University as tied for 46th best public university in the U.S. and tied for 98th overall among national universities, public and private.

In 2018, Diverse: Issues In Higher Education ranked FIU first in the U.S. in granting bachelor's degrees, 7th in granting master's degrees, and 27th in granting doctoral degrees to minorities.

==== College of Business ====
The College of Business is accredited by the AACSB International–the Association to Advance Collegiate Schools of Business. U.S. News & World Report's "America's Best Colleges" (2015) ranked the undergraduate international business program sixth in the nation and it ranked the Chapman Graduate School of Business 15th in the nation for an International MBA.

==== College of Law ====
FIU graduates achieved the highest passage rate among all Florida law schools on the July 2015, February 2016, and July 2016 exams. In 2007, the College of Law was ranked first in Florida in the Multistate Professional Responsibility Exam at 96%.

=== Honors College ===
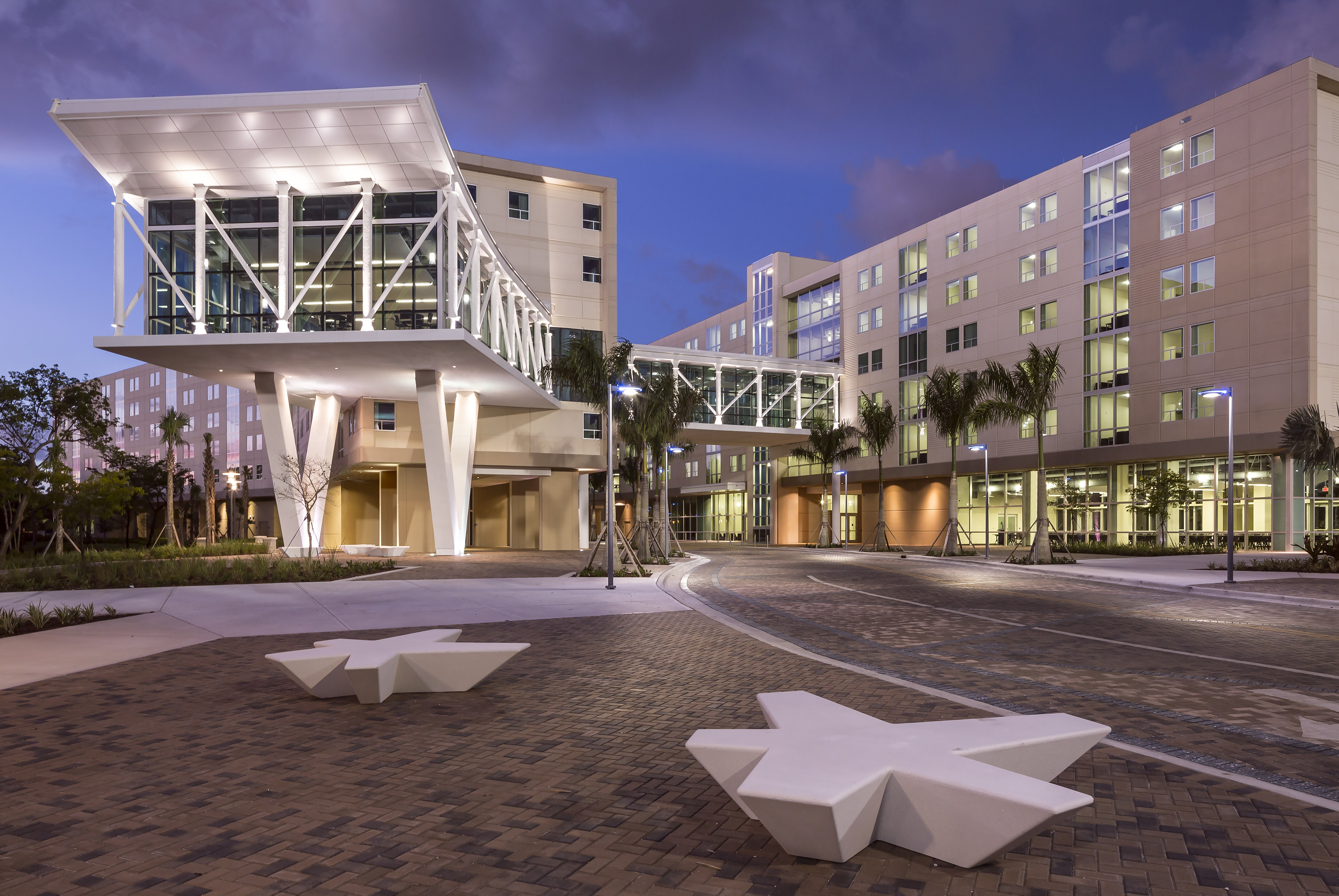
Parkview Hall, the home of honors students since 2013

The average academic profile of students the Honors College accepted in 2019 was as follows: 4.4 weighted GPA; 29 ACT composite; 1329 SAT total.

=== International programs ===
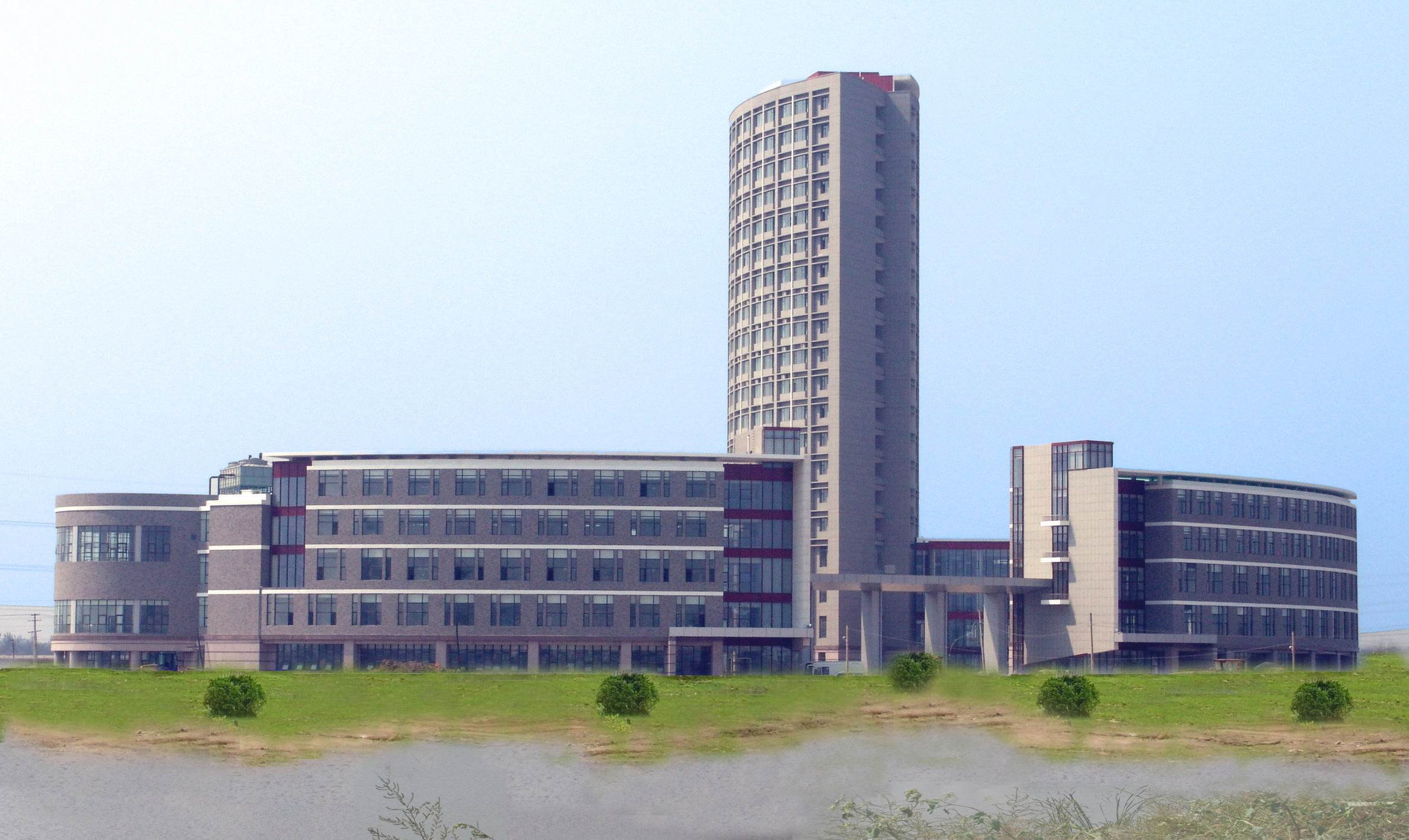
FIU Tianjin Center in Tianjin, China

Florida International University's Education Abroad program (FIU EA) has an international presence in Europe, Asia, and Latin America. Every year FIU consistently sends over 1,000 students across the world to study in multiple locations. EA students may take classes that meet their major and/or minor requirements, study with experts in their field, and earn FIU credit. In addition, the university has exchange agreements with over 70 partner institutions.

In Italy, FIU's presence is centered in the Genoa area. The Wolfsonian-FIU Museum has a regional facility in the Nervi area, and the School of Architecture has facilities in Genoa for FIU's upper-division and graduate architecture students. In 2006, FIU opened the Florida International University Tianjin Center in China, from which a branch of the School of Hospitality & Tourism Management operates. The Tianjin Center was constructed as a cooperative venture with the local municipal government. It temporarily closed in 2020 due to the COVID-19 pandemic.

While FIU does not have a campus in Colombia, its extensive involvement in efforts in that country—including river conservation, public health, and justice reform—led the university to designate it one of its "World Centers".

=== Model United Nations Program ===
The FIU Model United Nations Program is a program of the School of International and Public Affairs. FIU MUN was ranked the top Model UN Team in North America for the 2018–2019 season.

FIU MUN also hosts an annual high school conference: Florida International Model United Nations (FIMUN). The conference traditionally hosts over 500 high school students.

=== FIU Libraries ===
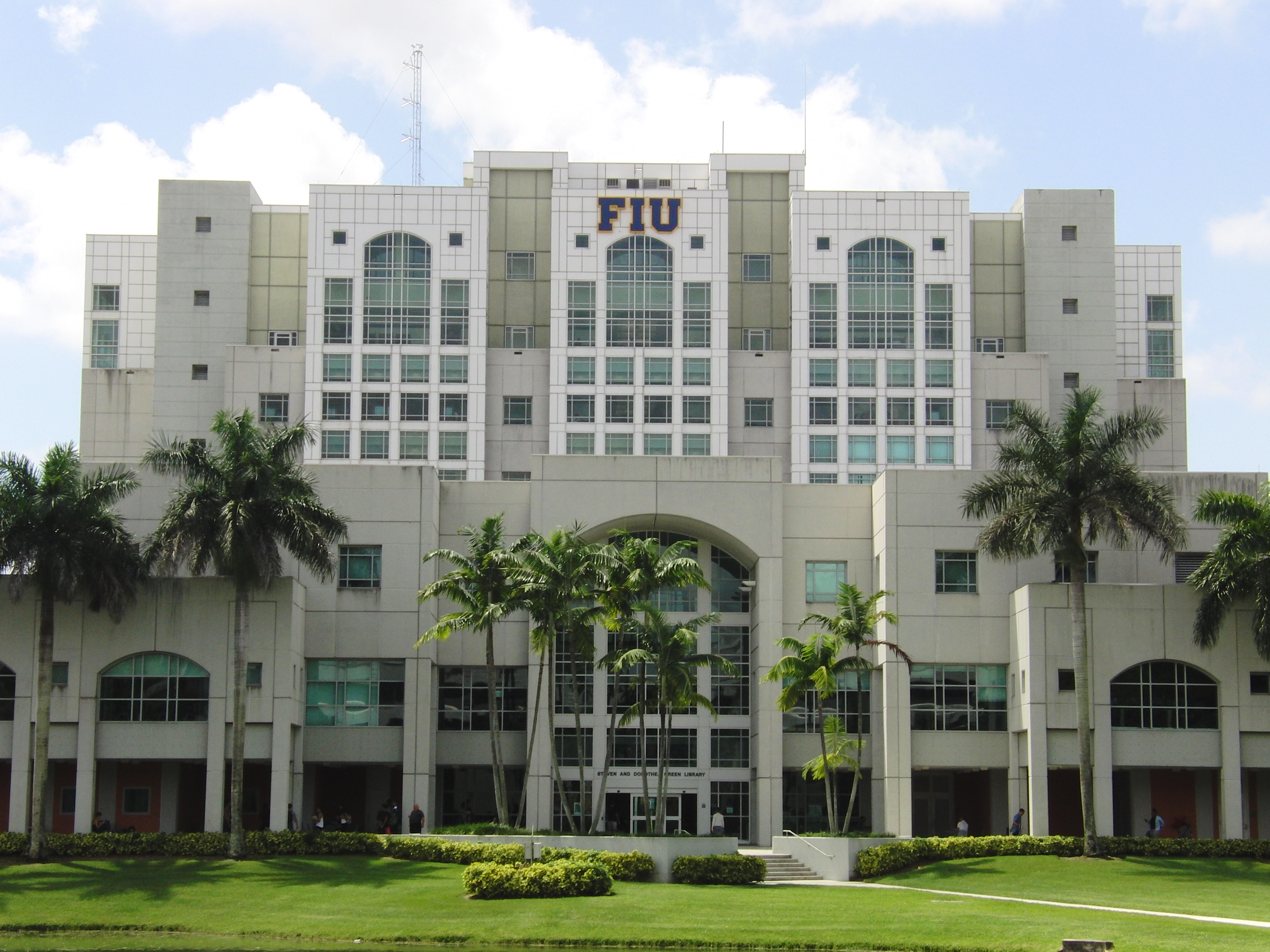
The Green Library is one of the largest libraries in the Southeastern U.S. and is the largest building on campus.

FIU has six libraries, Green Library, FIU's main library; the Glenn Hubert Library (Biscayne Bay Campus), the Wolfsonian Library, the Engineering Library, the Law Library, and the Medical Library. The Green Library, Hubert Library, and Engineering Library Service Center are under the direction of the Dean of University Libraries. Other libraries are overseen by their appropriate schools or organizations.

Together the entire FIU university-wide Library holdings include over 2,097,207 volumes, 52,511 current serials, 3,587,663 microform units, and 163,715 audio visual units.

==== Libraries ====
The Green Library is FIU's main library and the largest building on campus. Originally designed by Architect David M. Harper in 1973, the Green Library was expanded by the architecture firm M. C. Harry & Associates, Inc. in the early 1990s to its current eight floors, with a capacity to expand to a total of 15 floors, if necessary. The eight-floor structure was built over, through, and around the original three-story library while it was still in use.

The first floor has classrooms, auditorium spaces, and support services for students, such as tutoring, the writing center, and technology assistance. Also on the first floor is an Auntie Anne's and a Starbucks. The second floor has the reference section, cartography (GIS Center), circulation, and numerous computer and printing labs. The third floor is the home of the Medical Library, and includes study lounges as well as a resource center for students of the Honors College. The fourth floor houses the special collections department and university archives. The fifth floor is the home of the School of Architecture Library, as well as the music and audiovisual collections. The sixth and seventh floors are strictly quiet floors, and contain the general book collection along with numerous student study lounges. The eighth floor contains the library's administration offices and technical services departments.

The FIU Engineering Library is on the second floor of the main building of the Engineering Center. The FIU Law Library opened in 2002, and has three floors, with all three holding the library's general collection. The third floor has a two-story, quiet reading room, as well as numerous study lounges. Although the Law Library is restricted to Law students, other students may use the library for research purposes. The FIU Medical Library opened in 2009, at the same time as the Herbert Wertheim College of Medicine. The Medical Library is on the third floor of Green Library building. Future construction of buildings for the College of Medicine will include a new space for the Medical Library outside of Green Library, based upon funding and space availability.

The Glenn Hubert Library, previously named the Biscayne Bay Library, is a smaller three-story structure serving the Biscayne Bay Campus. All services at the Green Library are available in the Hubert Library. The Wolfsonian Library is at the Wolfsonian-FIU Museum in South Beach, on the corner of Washington Avenue and 10th Street. The collection focuses exclusively on architecture, art, design, and history of the Western World from 1885 to 1945. The library serves mostly as a research library with an extensive collection of primary sources.

== Research ==
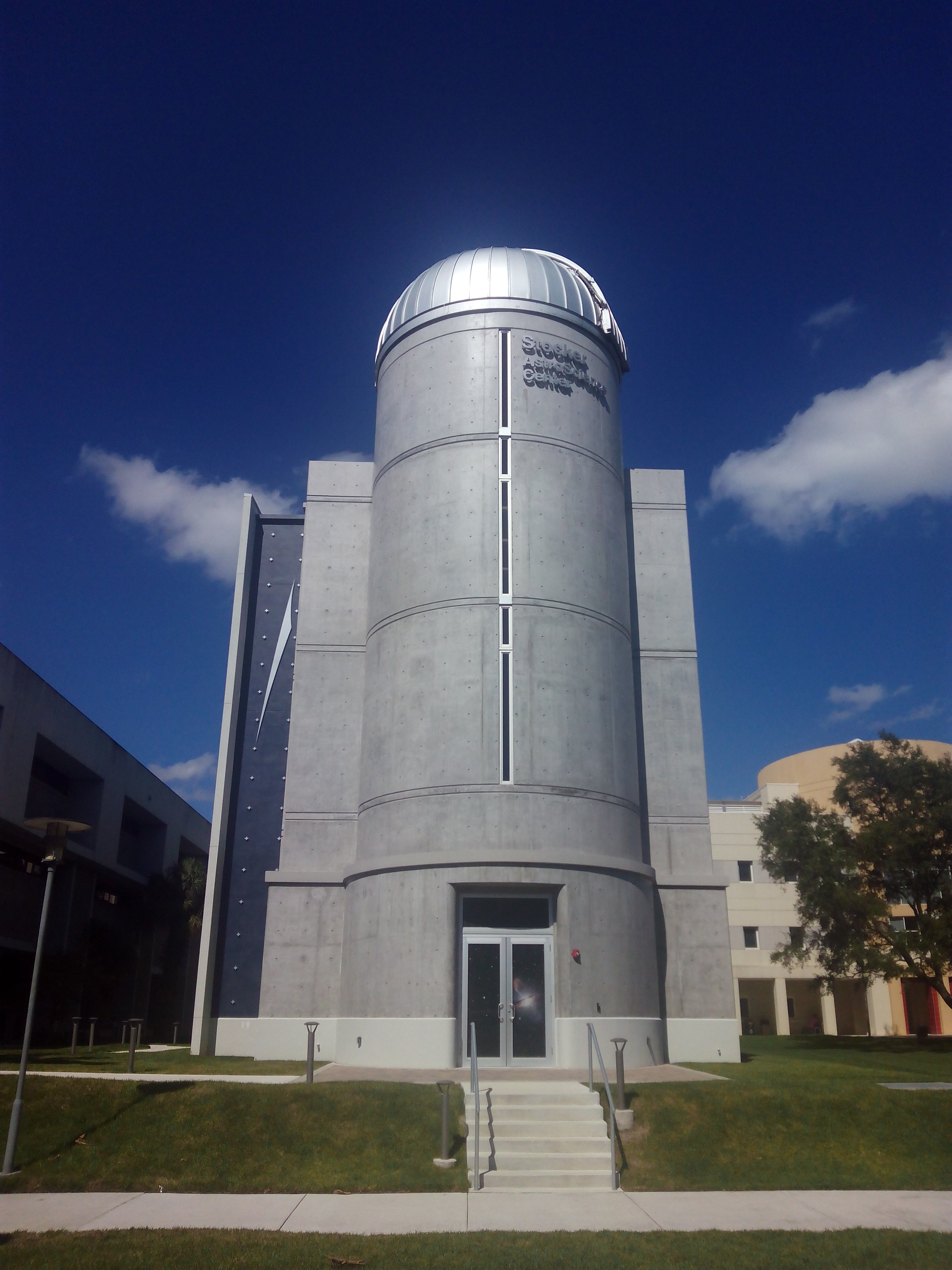
The Stocker AstroScience Center (ASTRO) boasts a 24-inch, computerized research-grade telescope with dual-filter wheels and research-grade CCD cameras.

Florida International University spent $246 million in annual research expenditures and was awarded $310 million in research awards for fiscal year 2021. FIU ranked 107th in total research and development (R&D) expenditures by the National Science Foundation. FIU is classified among "R1: Doctoral Universities – Very high research activity".

=== International Hurricane Research Center ===
The International Hurricane Research Center (IHRC) is the nation's only university-based research facility dedicated to tropical storm research. It comprises the Laboratory for Coastal Research; the Laboratory for Social Science Research; the Laboratory for Insurance, Financial & Economic Research; and the Laboratory for Wind Engineering Research, as well as the FIU Wall of Wind. The 12-fan Wall of Wind (WoW) at FIU is the largest and most powerful university research facility of its kind and is capable of simulating a Category 5 hurricane. In 2015 the National Science Foundation selected the 12-fan WOW as one of the nation's major "Experimental Facilities" under the Natural Hazards Engineering Research Infrastructure (NHERI) competition. Not to be confused with the National Hurricane Center (also at University Park), the IHRC is on the western side of the campus.

== Student life ==
=== Traditions ===
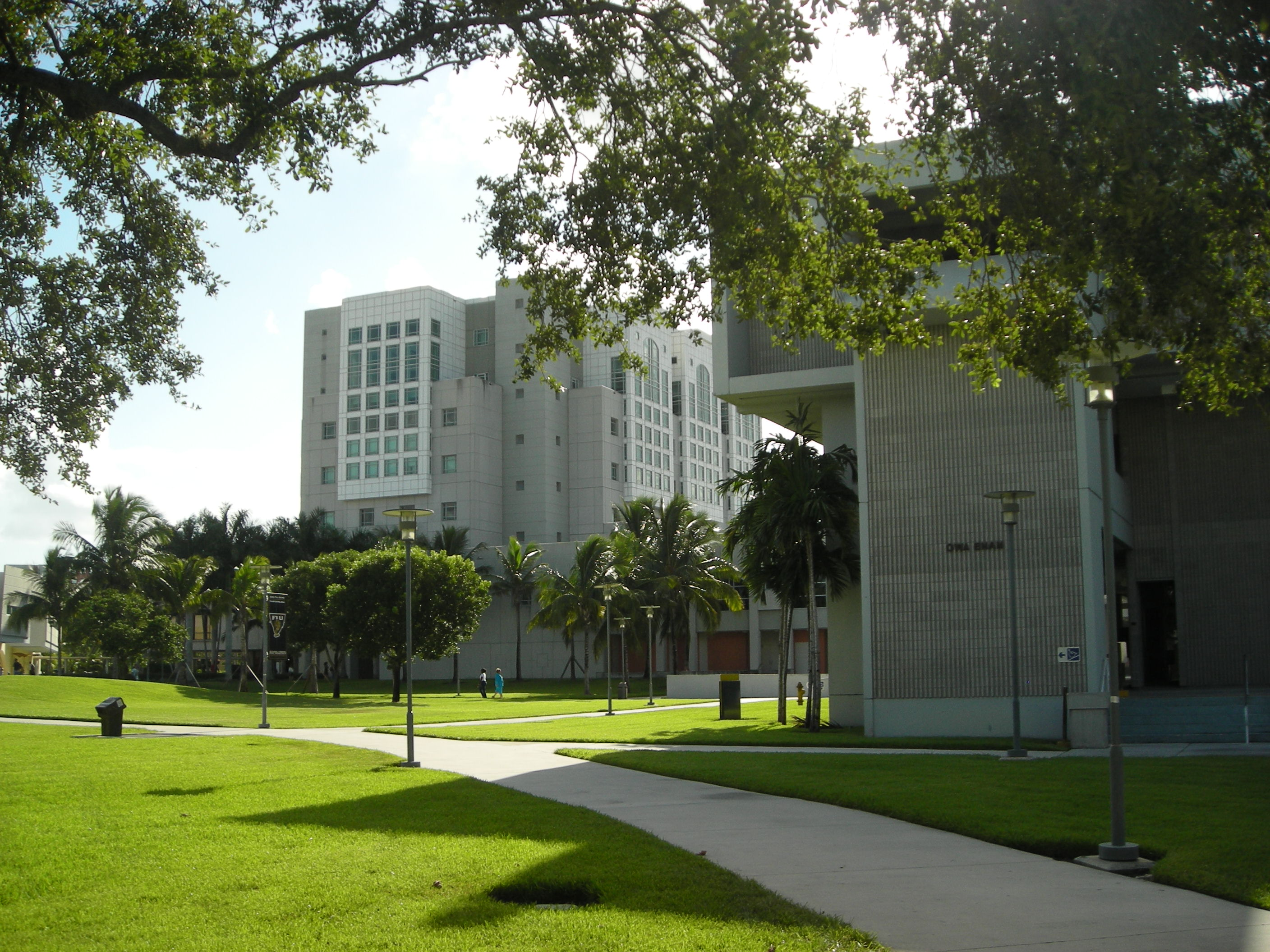
Green Library and Owa Ehan ("Sixth House")

FIU has many traditions from student spirit groups, alumni association events, and student spirit events. Incoming students can attend Panther Camp, originally a weekend retreat in the summer and now a two-day on-campus event, which began in 2006. Week of Welcome, usually held the first or second week of the fall semester, holds many spirit events, such as Trail of the Torch, when the torch of knowledge in front of the Primera Casa building is lit on campus.

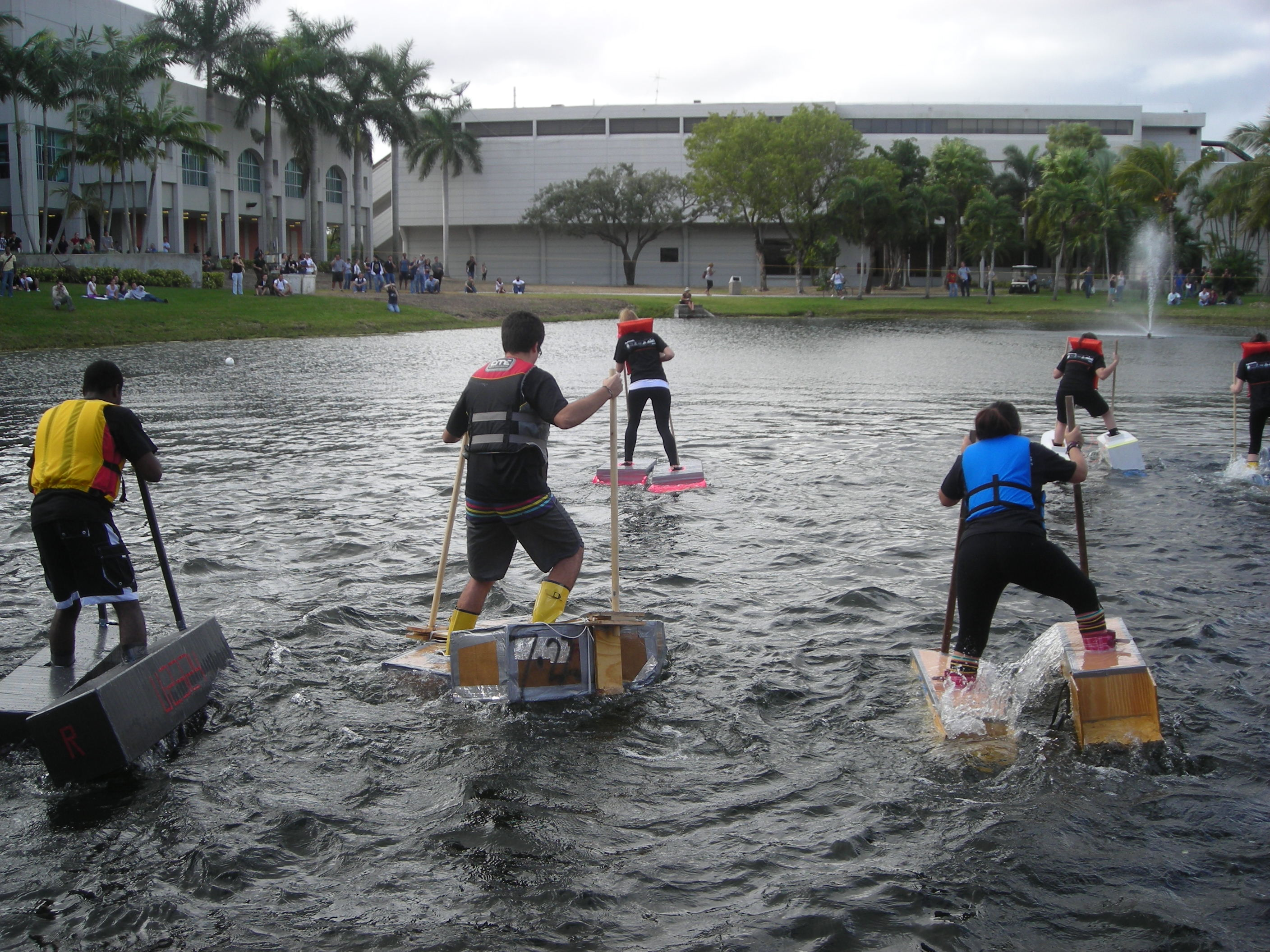
The Walk on Water race held annually by the School of Architecture

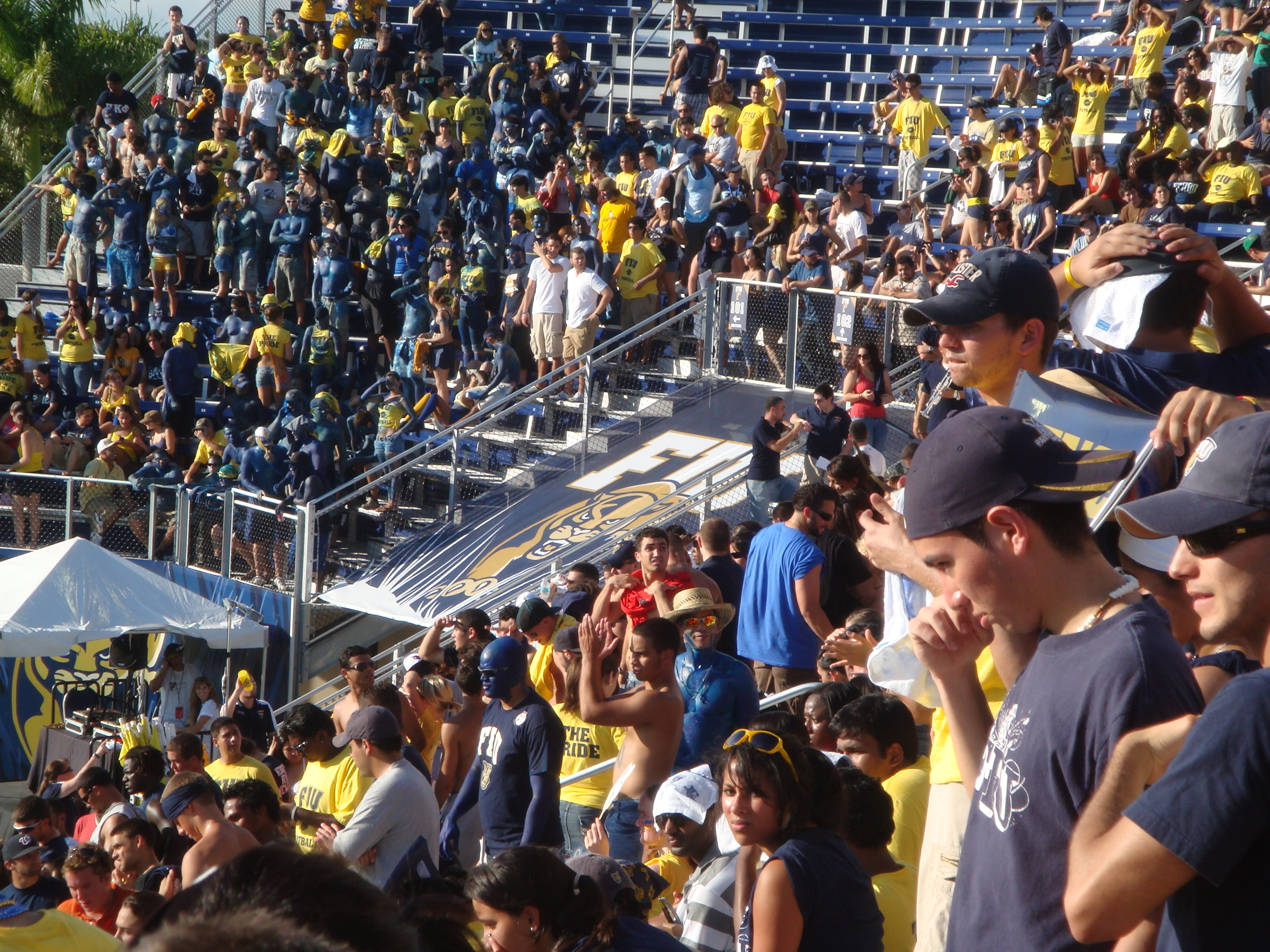
FIU fans at Riccardo Silva Stadium

=== Residential life ===
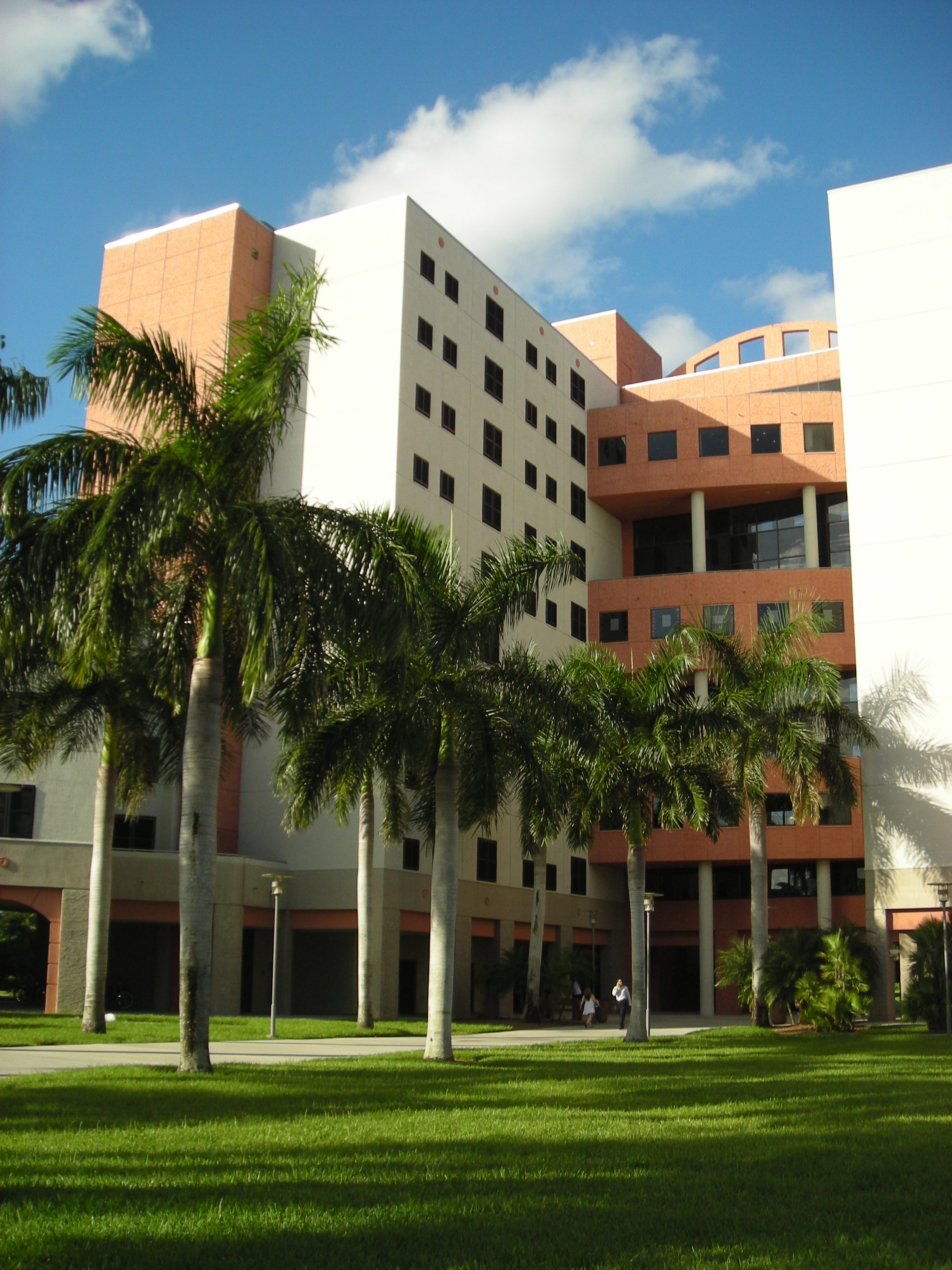
University Towers, a residential hall for upperclassmen

Florida International University's student housing facilities are managed by the Office of Housing and Residential Life located on the Modesto Maidique Campus (MMC). There are 3,800 students living on campus throughout 10 apartment buildings and 6 residence halls. Students reside in the following buildings: University Apartments, Panther Hall, University Towers, Everglades Hall, Lakeview Hall North, Lakeview Hall South, Honors College @ Parkview Hall, and Tamiami Hall. All rooms are suite style or apartment style and none of the buildings have community bathrooms.

On the Biscayne Bay Campus (BBC), FIU offers housing through Bayview Student Living apartments. BBC's first on-campus new housing in 30+ years houses 408 students in a high rise overlooking Biscayne Bay. Through FIU's Panther Express Shuttle, current students travel free between campuses. The Office of Housing and Residential Life also offers optional communities in the residence halls known as Living Learning Communities (LLCs). These communities offer residents the opportunity to live with individuals of the same major or interest; including, Business, Wellness, and Honors Place for Honors College students.

=== Arts and culture ===
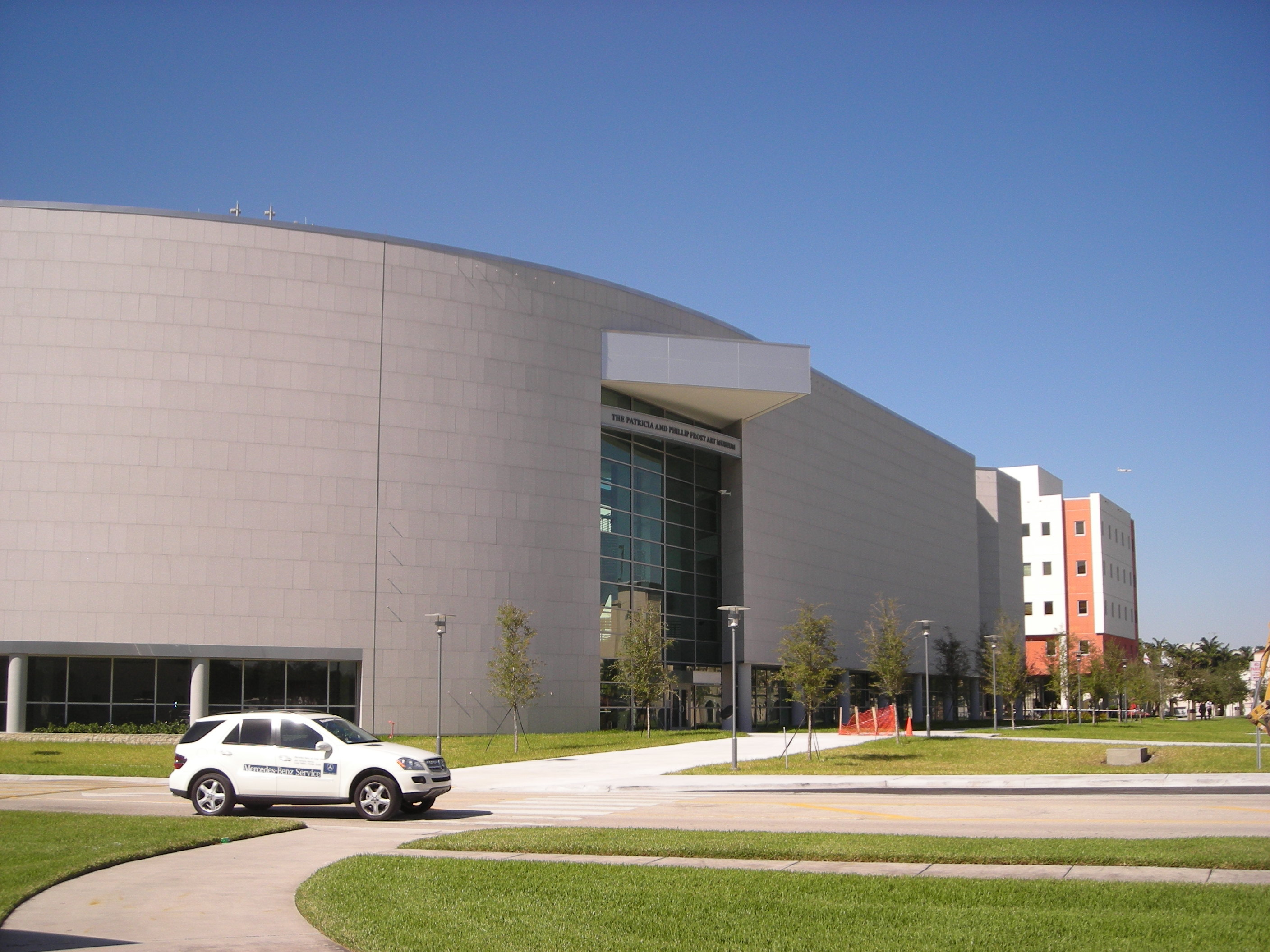
Frost Art Museum

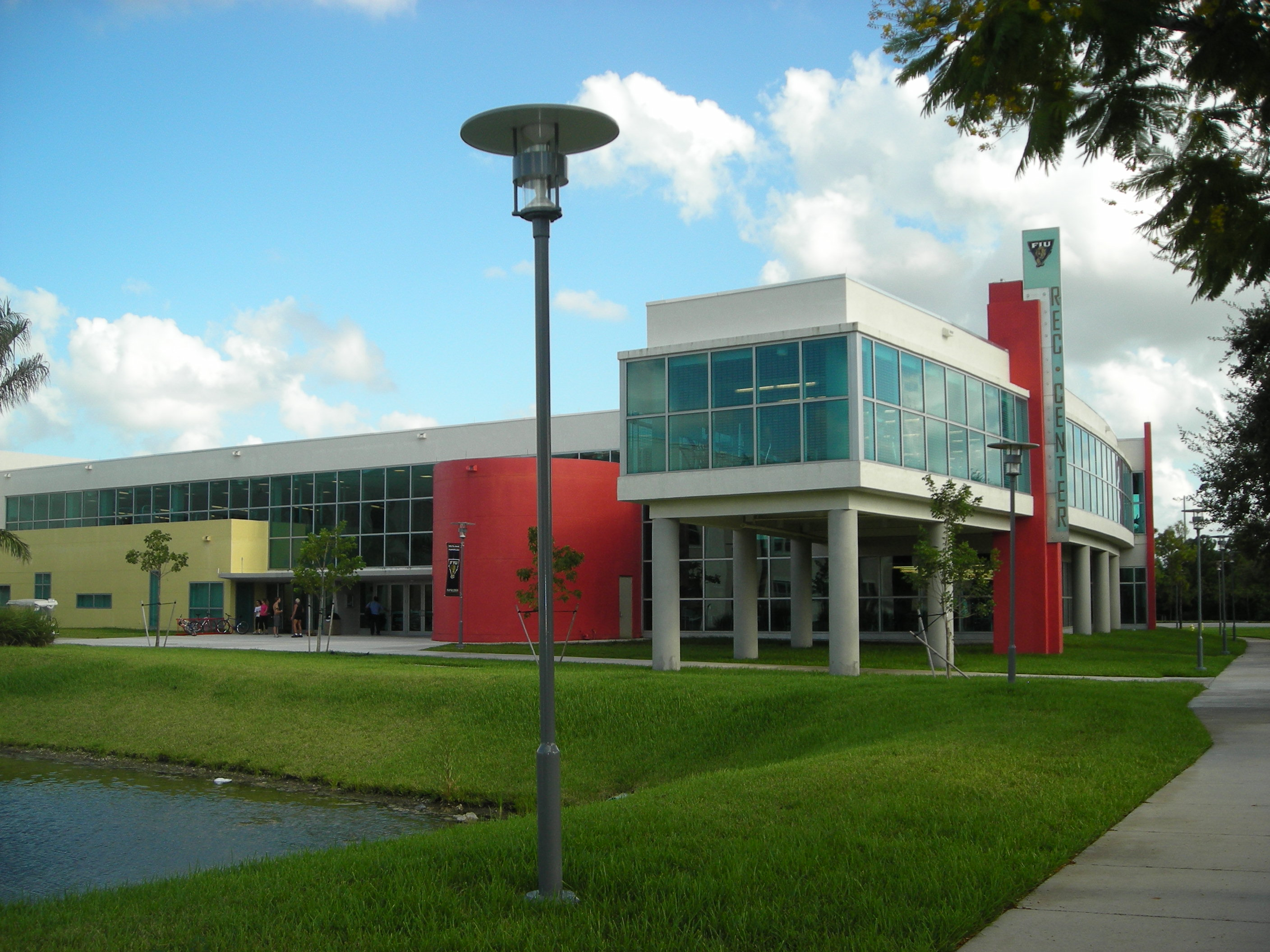
Recreation Center

FIU has three museums, the Frost Art Museum, the Wolfsonian-FIU Museum and the Jewish Museum of Florida. The Frost Art Museum is located on Modesto A. Maidique campus and was opened in 1977 as The Art Museum at Florida International University. The Frost Art Museum's Permanent Collection consists of a broad array of art objects from ancient cultural artifacts to contemporary works of art. The Wolfsonian-FIU Museum is located in Miami Beach and promotes the collection, preservation and understanding of decorative art and design from the period from 1885 to 1945. FIU also has a large sculpture collection, named the Sculpture Park at FIU, with sculptures from such prominent artists as Anthony Caro, Jacques Lipchitz, Daniel Joseph Martinez, and Tony Rosenthal. Many different art structures, statues, paintings and mosaics can be seen throughout campus in gardens, buildings, walkways, and on walls.

The School of Music presents an annual series of concerts in a variety of genres, as well as learning facilities and opportunities for musicians. The concert season incorporates music of all styles including jazz, early music, chamber music, choral/vocal, contemporary music, wind, and opera theater performed by world class musicians and ensembles. Many masterclasses and lectures are also open to the public and offered at no charge. The season runs from August to April.

The Department of Theatre presents a season of four professionally designed, produced, and directed productions that serve as a laboratory for students. Its Main Stage season is presented at the Herbert and Nicole Wertheim Performing Arts Center. In addition to Main Stage productions, students write, direct, and perform productions in the Student Theatre Lab Studio. The department hosts The Green House during the summer, a development project of a new work by an established playwright. In the past, summers have also included additional department productions, student-directed pieces, alumni showcases, and reunion productions. The Florida International University School of Hospitality & Tourism Management hosts the Annual Food Network South Beach Wine & Food Festival in South Beach, a major national culinary event.

=== Order of the Torch ===
The Order of the Torch is a semi-secret honorary leadership society akin to other secret societies in the state, such as Florida Blue Key at the University of Florida and the Iron Arrow Honor Society at the University of Miami. The organization is rumored to have been founded in 2003 as a way of organizing student leadership to restructure student life to mirror that of a traditional university. Members include students, faculty, staff and community members, including FIU alumni Miami-Dade County Mayor Carlos Alvarez (class of 1974). Top leadership in Student Government, Homecoming, and the most elite campus fraternal organizations rank among its members.

=== Greek life ===
About 1,100 undergraduates, or 2% of the undergraduate student body, are members of a fraternity or sorority. In December 2017, FIU temporarily paused Greek life activities in the wake of a series of hazing events nationally and the discovery of a group chat of Tau Kappa Epsilon members that contained photos of nude women. TKE and two other institutions, Phi Gamma Delta ("Fiji") and Pi Kappa Phi, were suspended when FIU allowed fraternities and sororities to resume. FIU obtained the property of the Greek houses occupied by the latter two fraternities, the only such houses on campus.

=== Student media ===
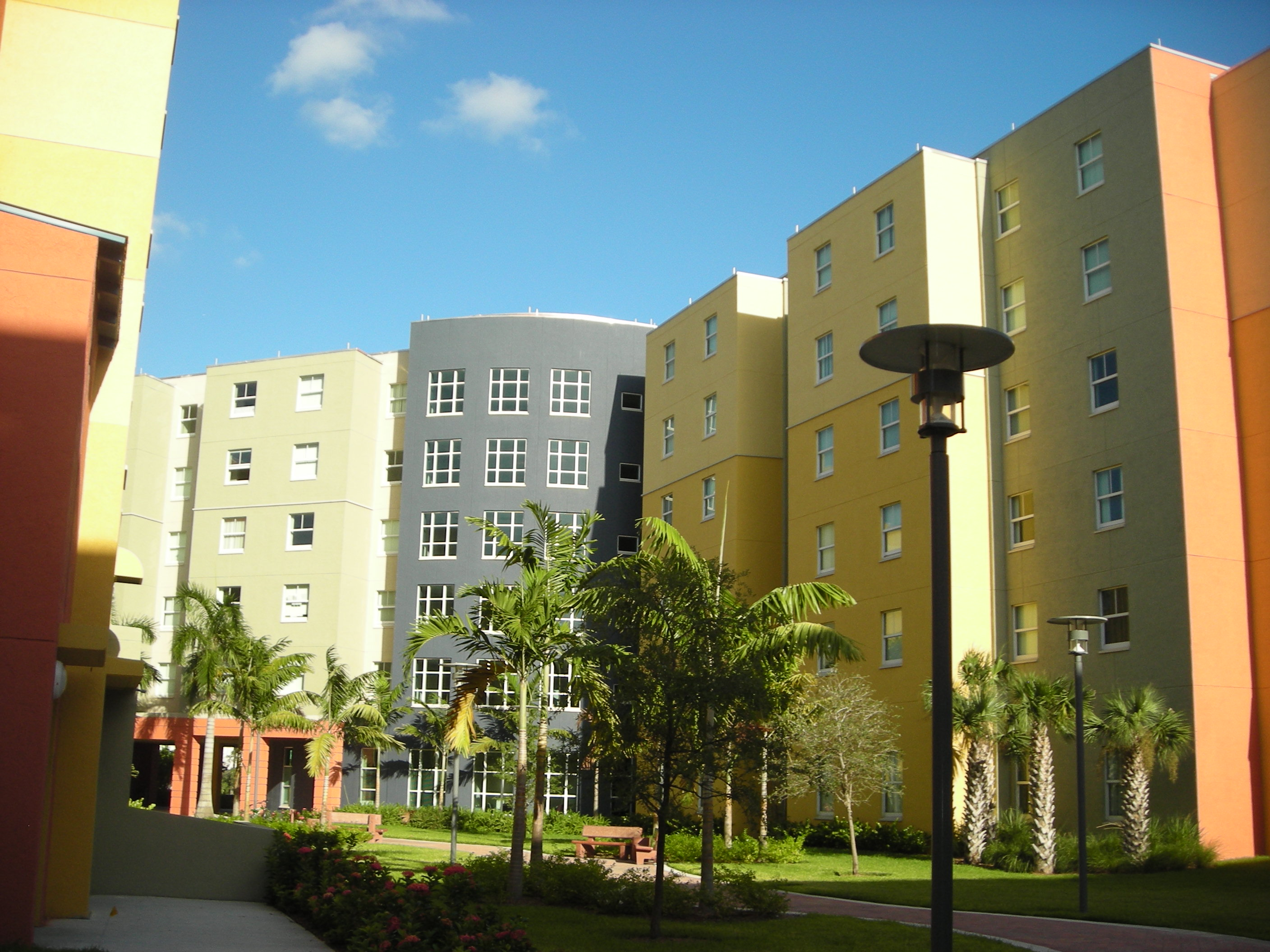
Lakeview Hall North and South residence halls; six percent of FIU students live on-campus

FIU Student Media includes PantherNOW, the student newspaper and its accompanying website, and FIU's radio station, WRGP.

PantherNOW is the FIU student newspaper, founded in 1972 and having printed under various titles. PantherNOW is published in print form monthly and also maintains a website, PantherNOW.com. WRGP "The Roar", with antecedents dating to 1988 and broadcasting on FM since 1999, is FIU's student-run radio station, with transmitters in Homestead and on the Maidique and Biscayne Bay campuses.

== In television and entertainment ==
FIU's campus has been the set for many films, television shows, and music videos. One of the earliest television shows to shoot at FIU was Miami Vice; an episode partially shot in the Sunblazer Arena was recorded in 1986, just after it opened. The TV show Burn Notice has also shot various episodes at FIU, with scenes at the College of Business Buildings and the Diaz-Balart College of Law Building. In 2007, Chris Brown filmed the music video for his song "Kiss Kiss" at FIU, with scenes near the Frost Art Museum and around the Graham Center. Various telenovelas for Telemundo and Univision have filmed television episodes at FIU as well. In 2007, Telemundo's Pecados Ajenos was filmed in the Graham Center. In 2004, MTV's Campus Invasion Tour was held at FIU, bringing numerous bands such as Hoobastank to FIU.

In 2009, TLC's What Not to Wear filmed an episode on campus at the Management and Advanced Research Center. In October 2009, former CNN news anchor Rick Sanchez broadcast his CNN show from the Graham Center at FIU. In 2012, G4TV held the Northeast and Southeast regional qualifying rounds of the television show American Ninja Warrior at FIU. The competition took place in the traffic loop between the School of Architecture and the College of Business. In 2015, FIU also hosted the Miss Universe 2014 pageant in the FIU Arena.

== Athletics ==
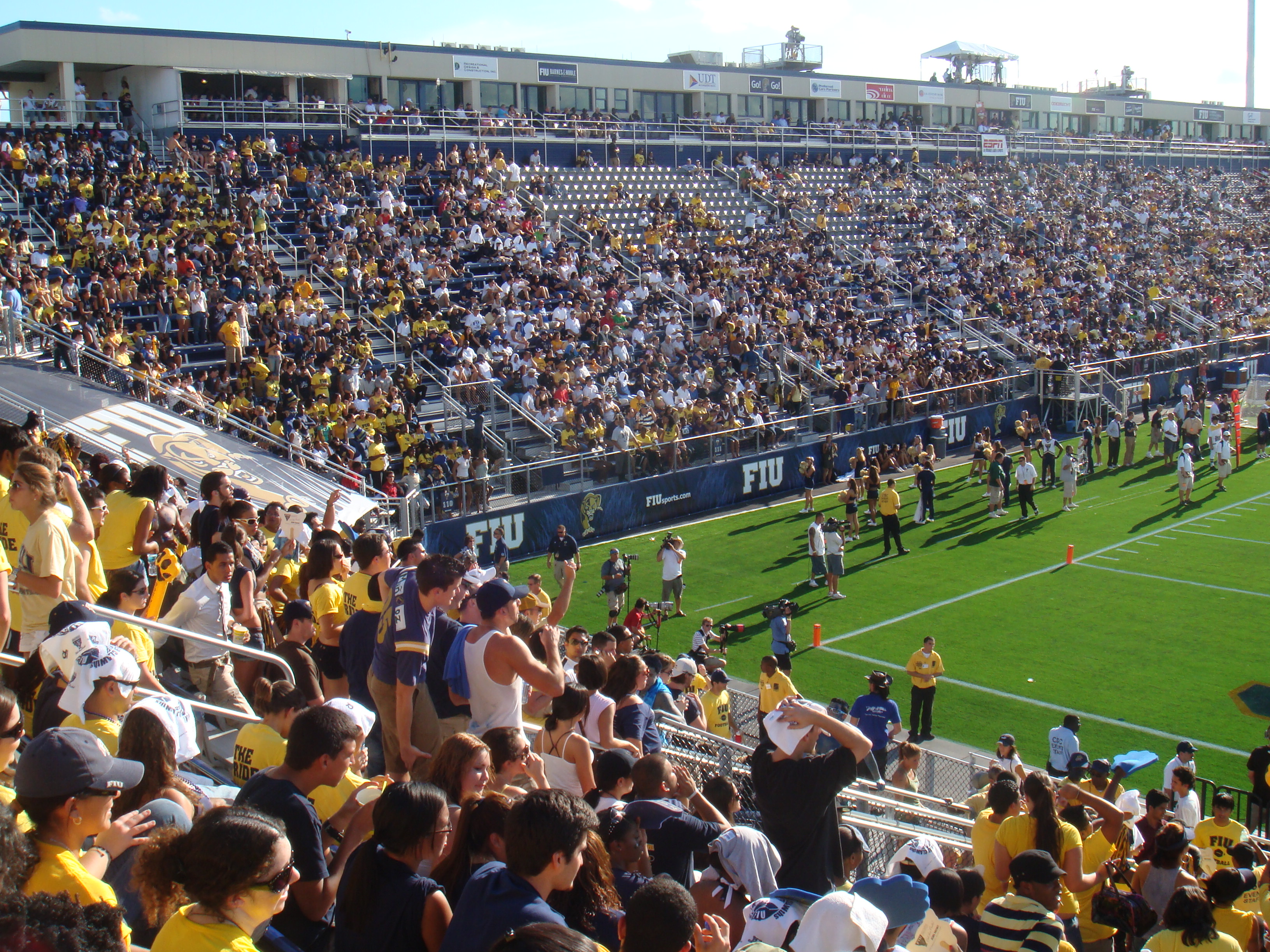
The Panthers football team plays at Pitbull Stadium on campus.

Florida International University has seventeen varsity sports teams, named the Panthers. The athletic colors for the Panthers are blue and gold, and they compete in the NCAA Division I as part of Conference USA in all sports. Three main sports facilities serve as home venues for Panther athletics. The Panthers football team plays at Pitbull Stadium ("The Cage"), the men and women's basketball and volleyball teams play at the Ocean Bank Convocation Center, and the men's baseball team plays at Infinity Insurance Park. Other athletics venues include the Aquatic Center, Tennis Complex, softball fields, and various other recreational fields. On July 1, 2013, FIU became a member of Conference USA.

Traditional rivals of the FIU Panthers include Florida Atlantic University and the University of Miami. The Panthers football team competes in the Shula Bowl, an annual football game played for the Don Shula Award against in-state rival Florida Atlantic University. Due to this competition, the rivalry between the two schools has grown, with the rivalry extending into the men's baseball and basketball teams as well.

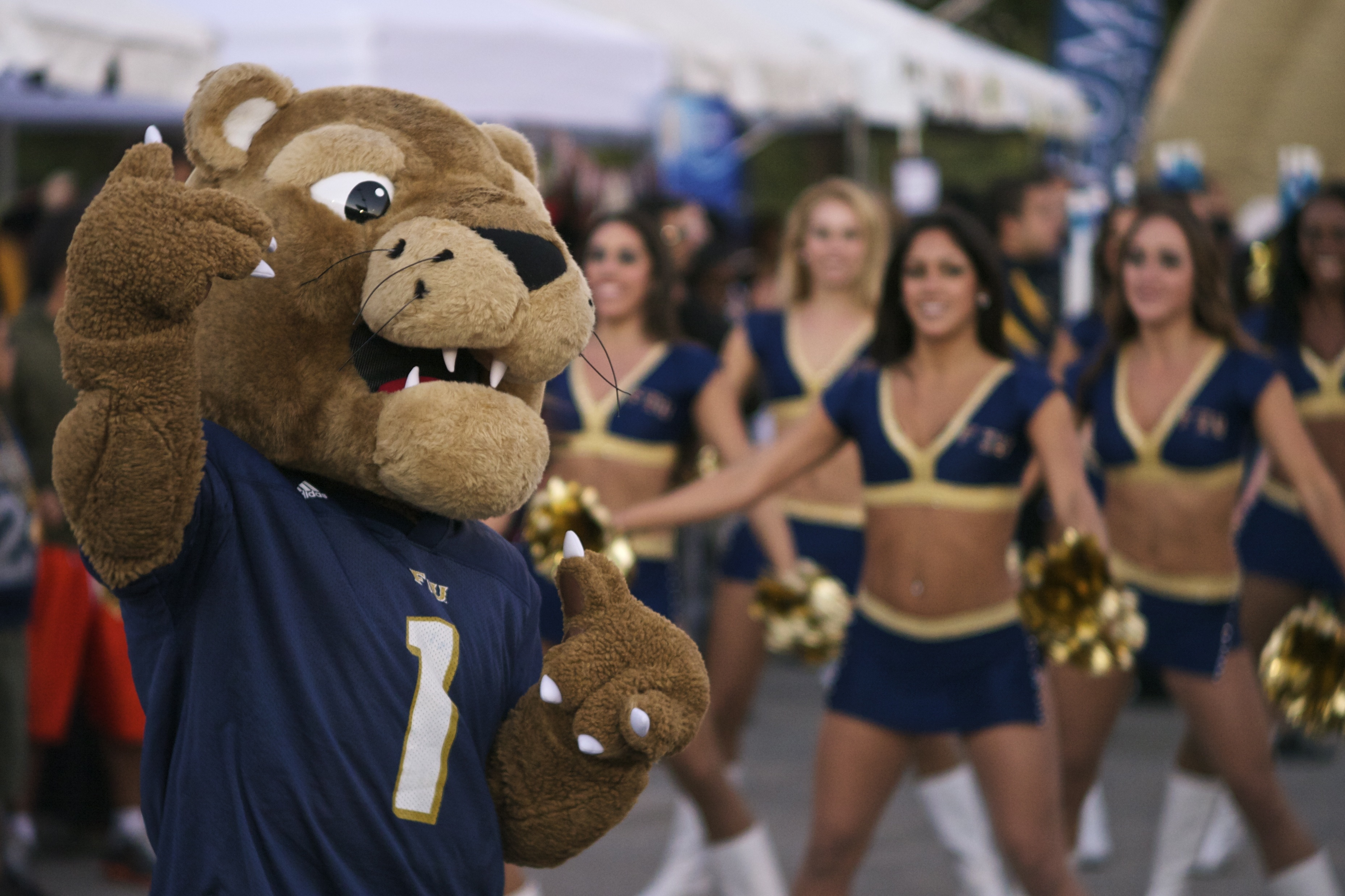
Roary and the FIU Dazzlers during 2010 Homecoming

The Panthers football team plays home games at Pitbull Stadium, nicknamed "The Cage". In 2005, the Panthers moved to the Sun Belt Conference, making their transition from Division I-FCS to Division I-FBS complete. In their first season in the conference, the Panthers began by finishing 5–6. The football program has one conference title to date—in 2010, when it won the Sun Belt Conference title and played in the Little Caesars Pizza Bowl against Toledo, winning late in the fourth quarter. The FIU men's basketball team has one NCAA tournament appearance to its record.

Alumni of the FIU athletics program include many professional and Olympic athletes, including current players in Major League Baseball, Major League Soccer, National Basketball Association, National Football League and the Women's National Basketball Association. Notable alumni include Mike Lowell, Raja Bell, Carlos Arroyo, and Tayna Lawrence.

== Notable alumni ==
FIU has over 275,000 alumni around the world in more than 138 countries. The university graduates more than 10,000 students a year. Alumni services is run by the Florida International University Alumni Association, which sponsors numerous alumni events, galas, and ceremonies annually.

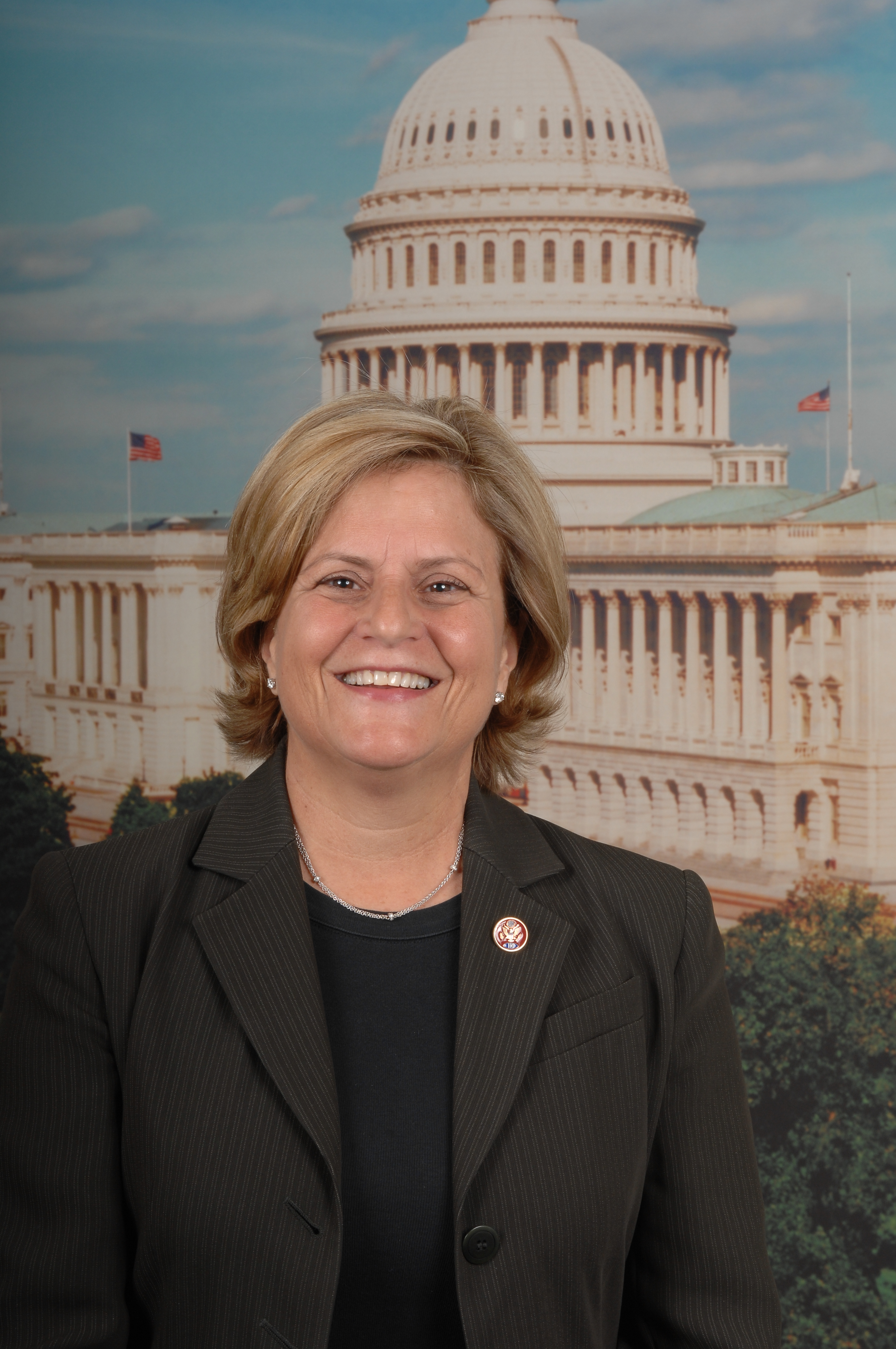
Ileana Ros-Lehtinen
Class of 1975 & 1986
U.S. representative

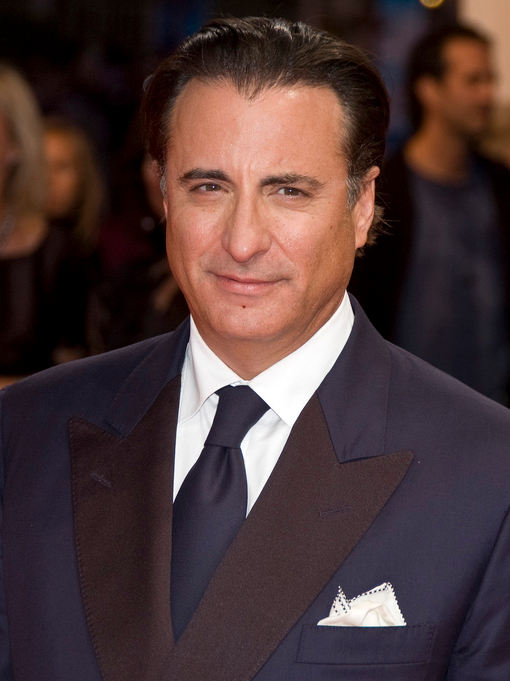
Andy García
Actor

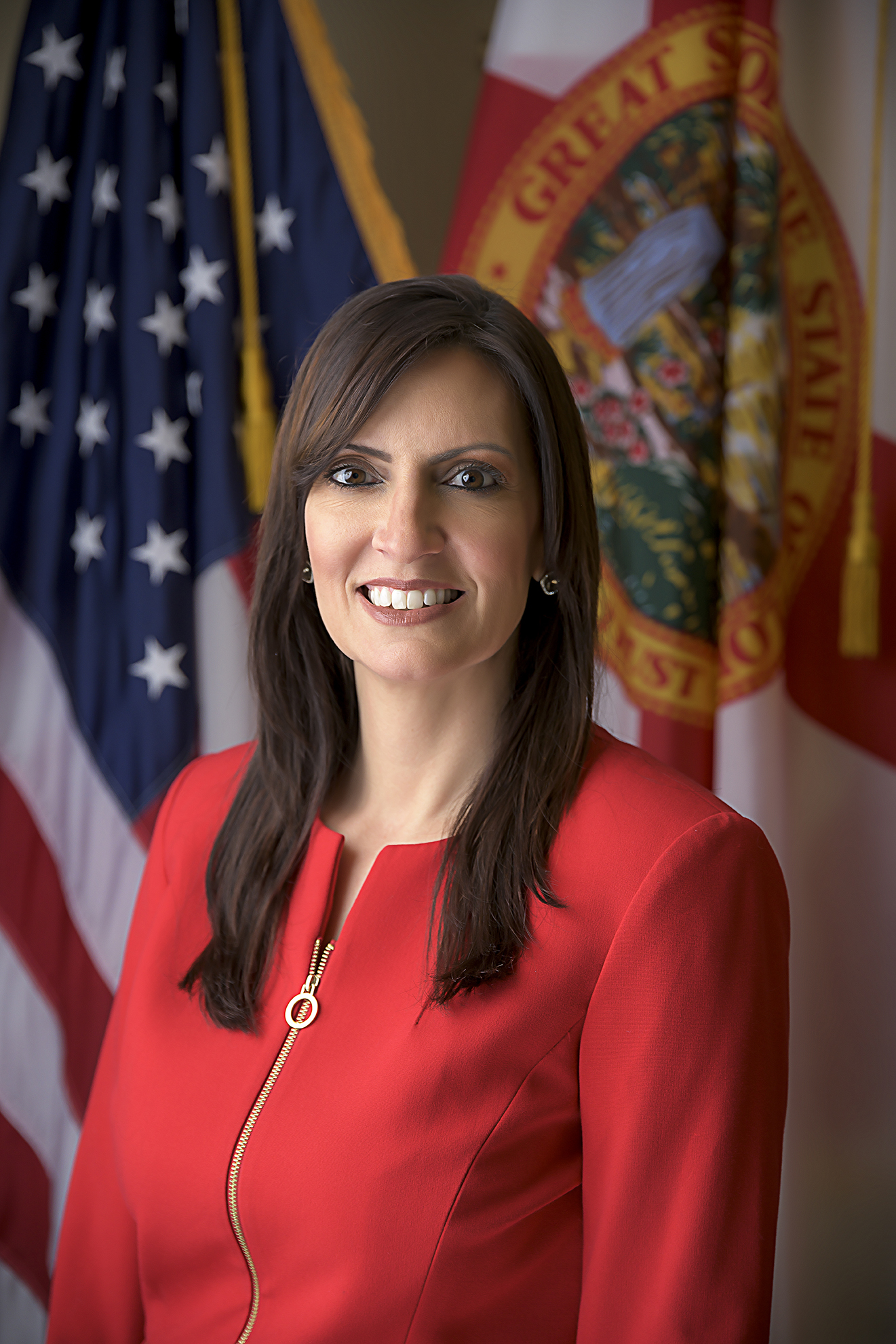
Jeanette Nuñez
Class of 1994 & 1998
20th lieutenant governor of Florida, politician and businesswoman

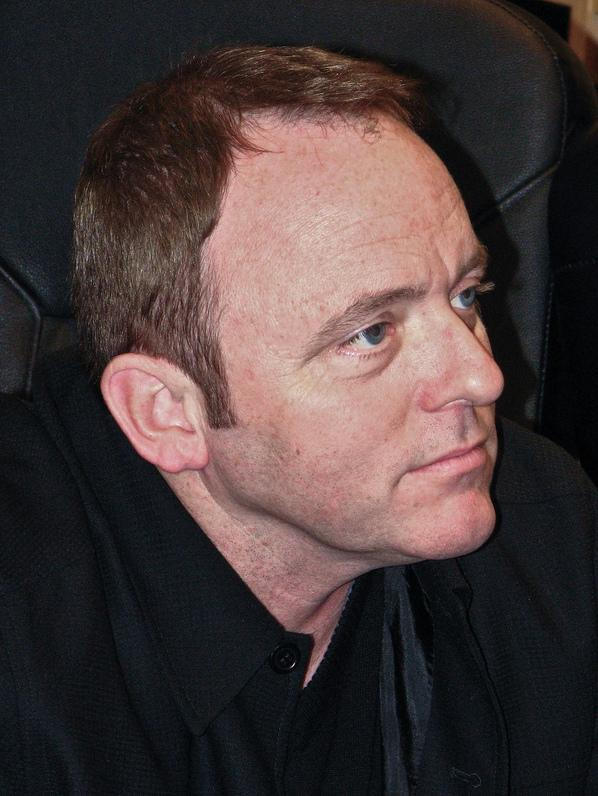
Dennis Lehane
Class of 2001
novelist and screenwriter

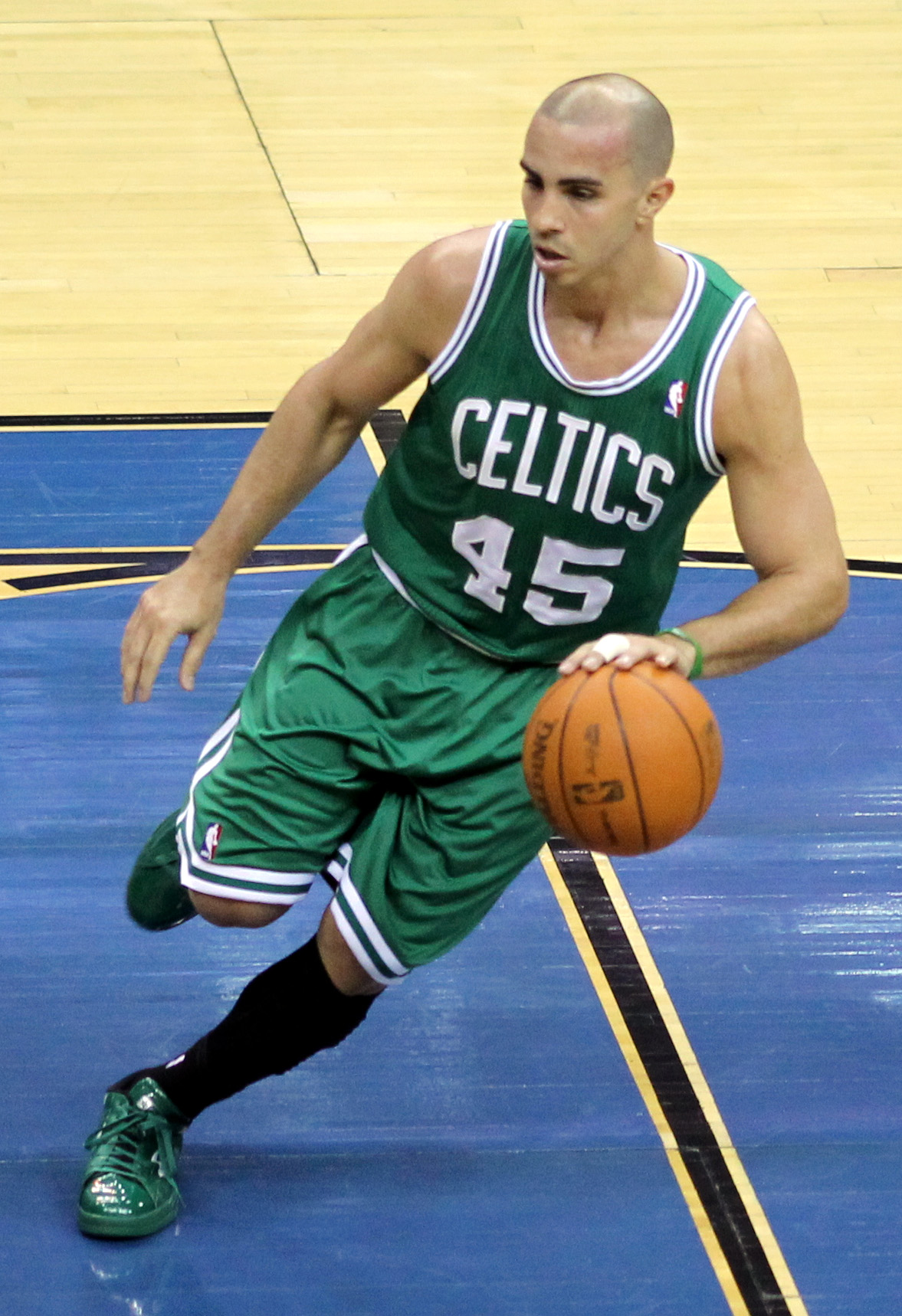
Carlos Arroyo
Class of 2001
NBA basketball player

Manny Diaz
Class of 1977
41st mayor of Miami

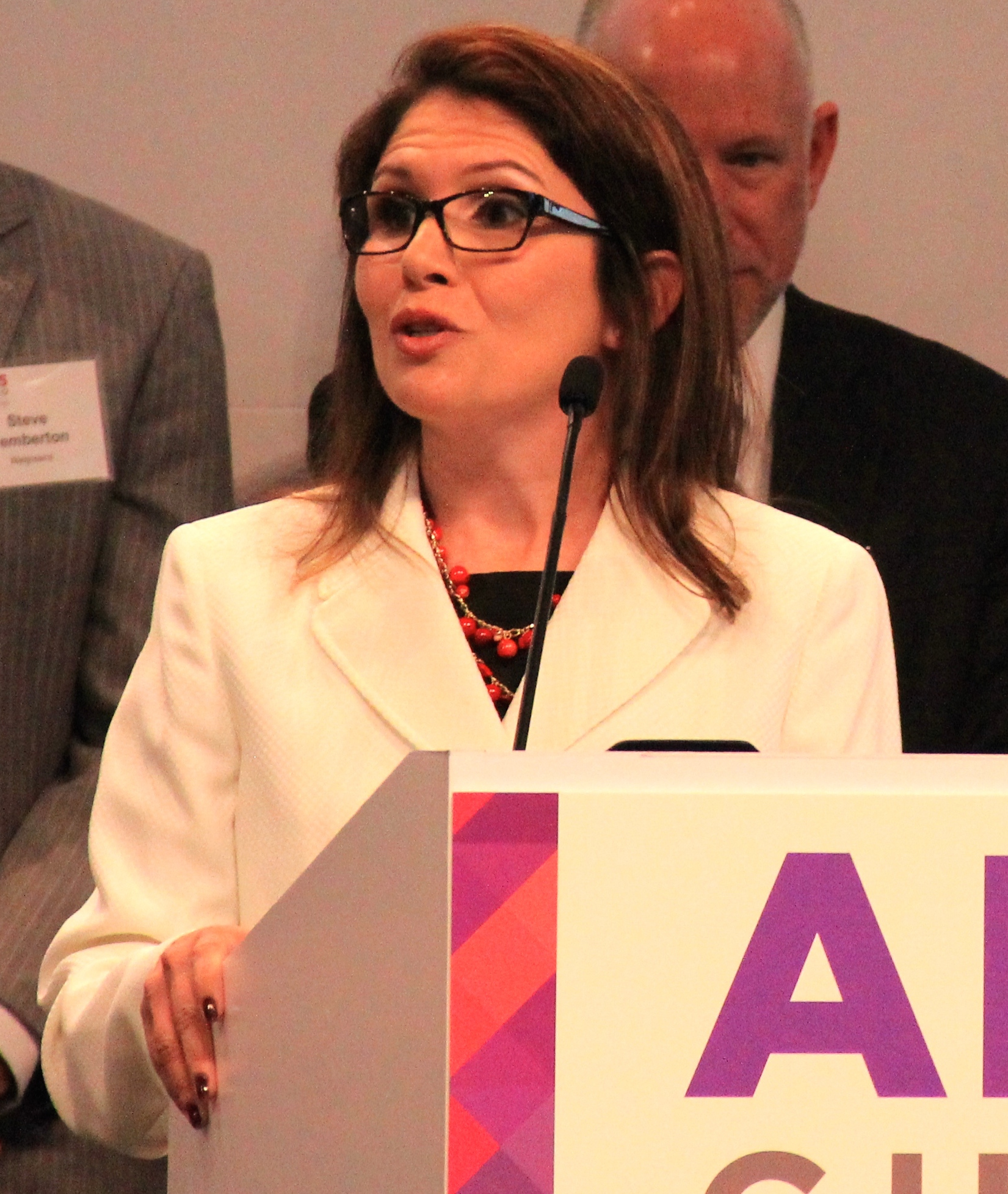
Evelyn Sanguinetti
47th lieutenant governor of Illinois

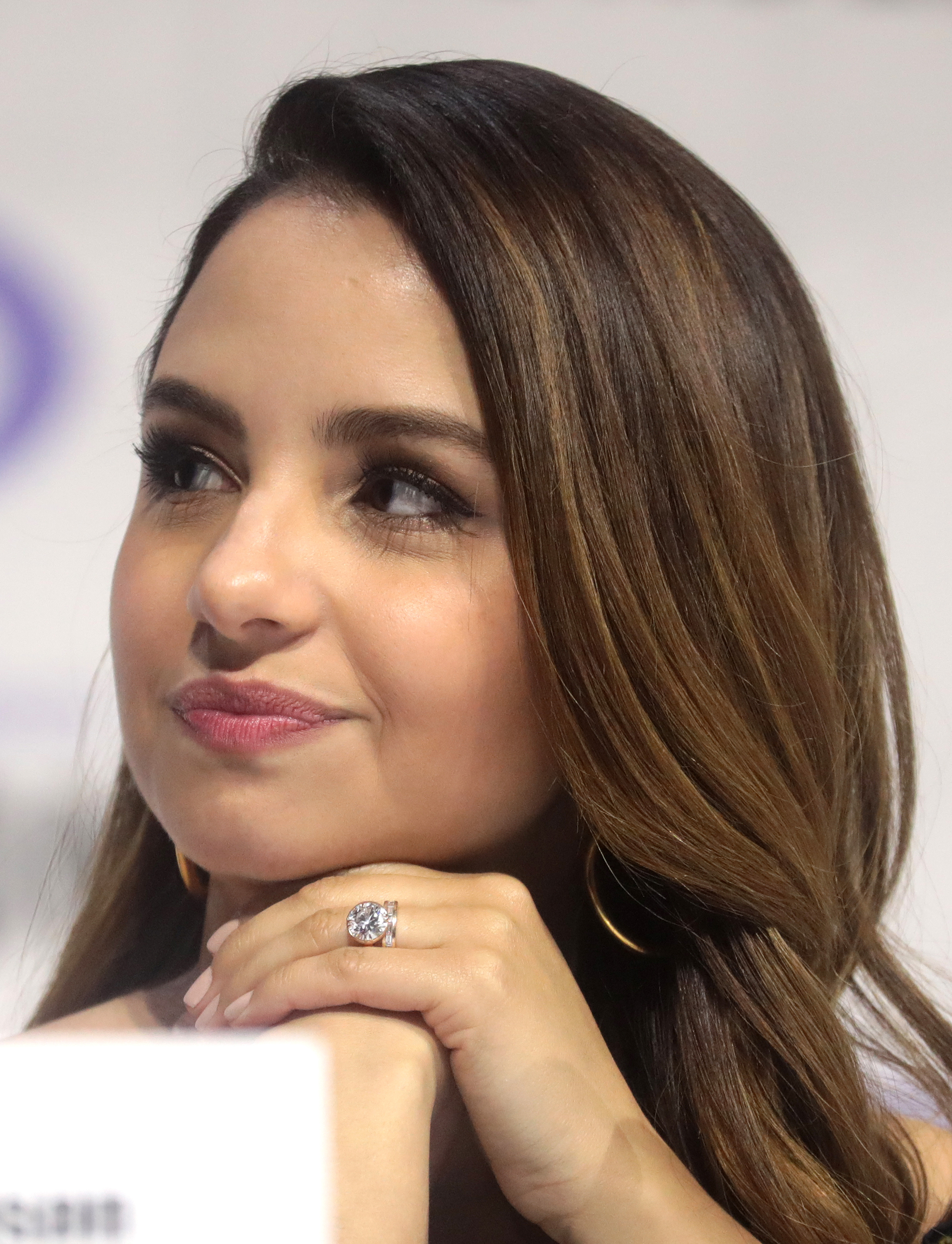
Aimee Carrero
Class of 2008
Actress

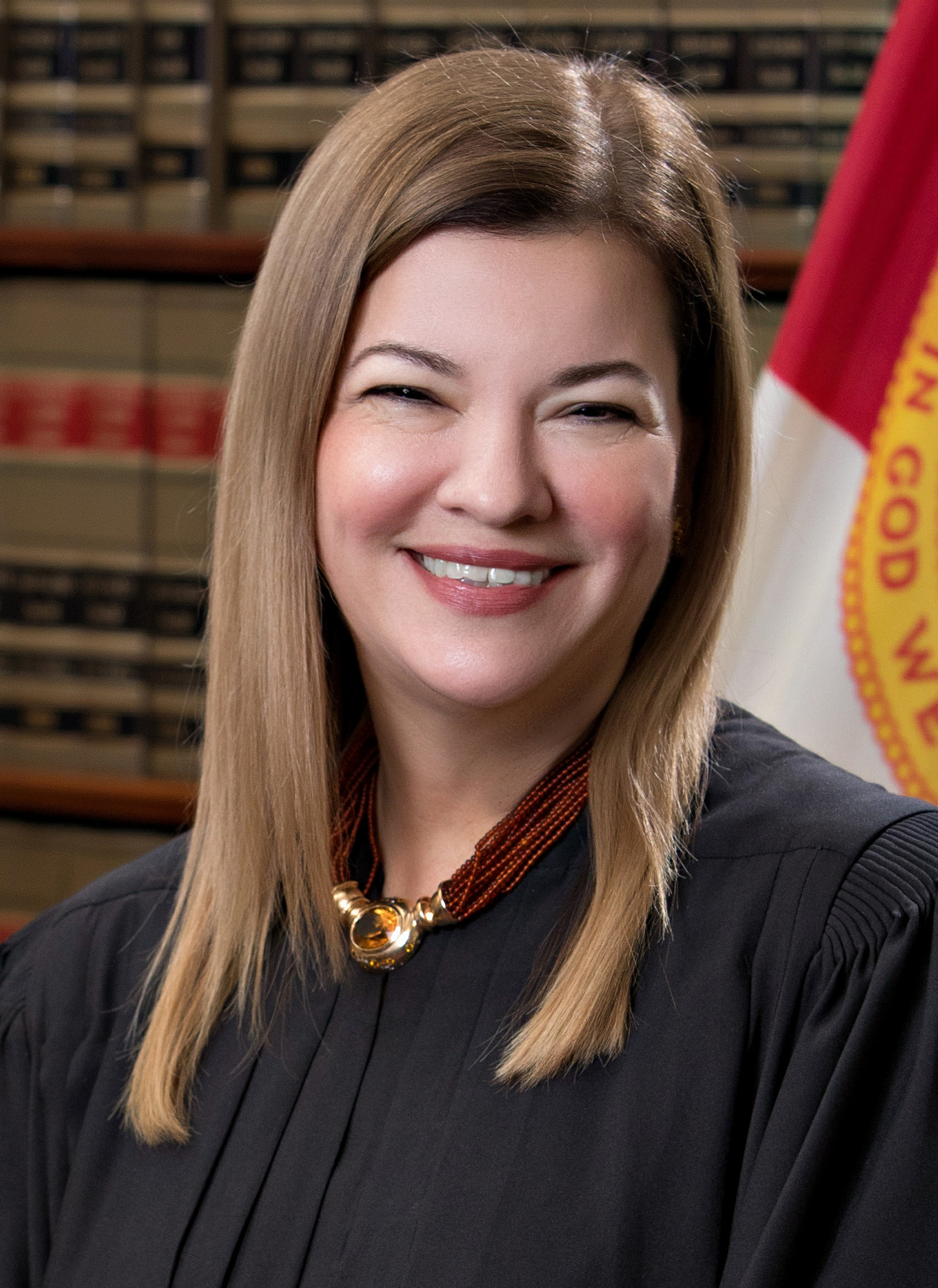
Barbara Lagoa
Class of 1989
United States circuit judge

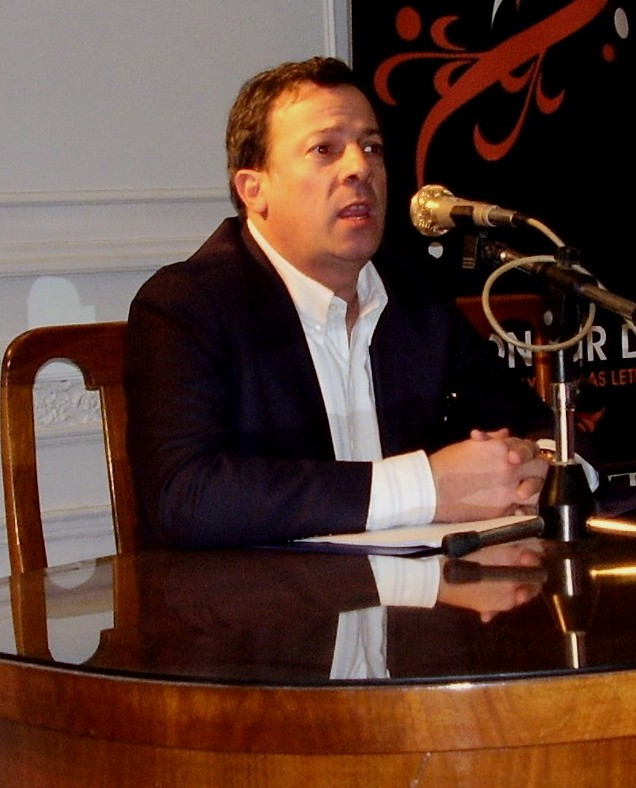
Carlos Alvarado-Larroucau
Class of 2000
Writer and poet

Kim Simplis Barrow
Belizean activist, philanthropist, and spouse of the 4th prime minister of Belize

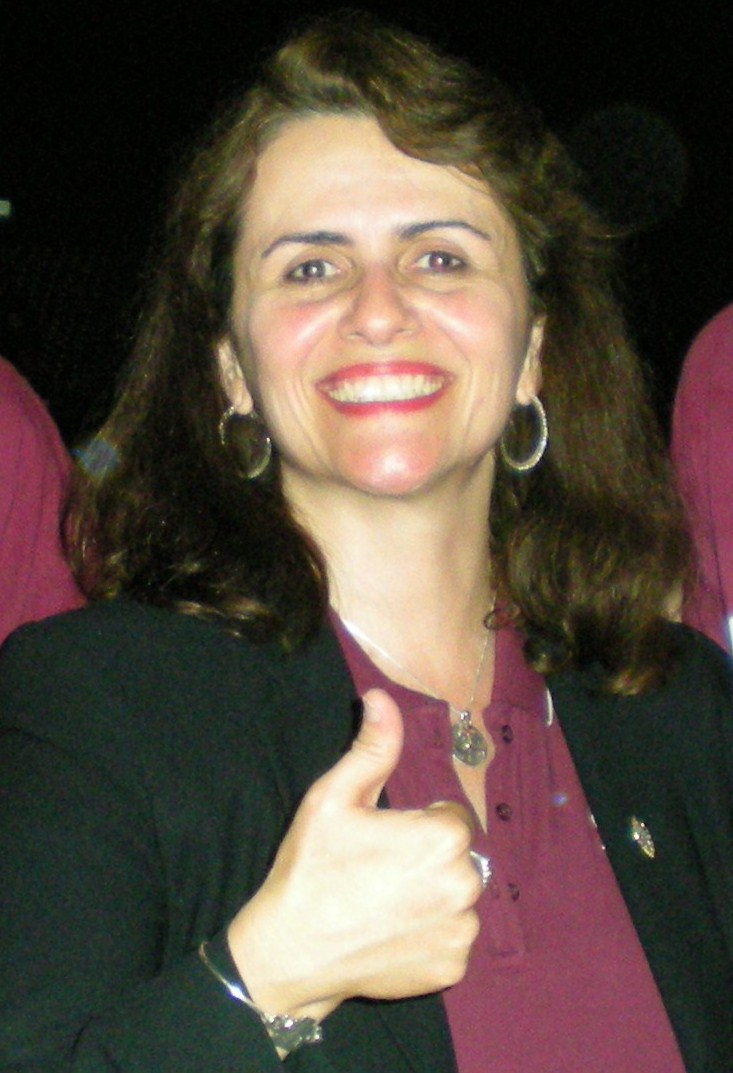
Elsa Murano
Class of 1981
23rd president of Texas A&M University

Kirill Reznik
Class of 1995
Maryland House of Delegates

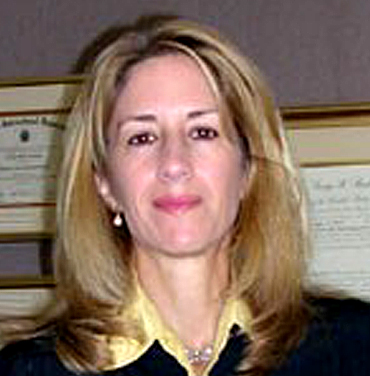
Cecilia Altonaga
Class of 1983
U.S. district court judge

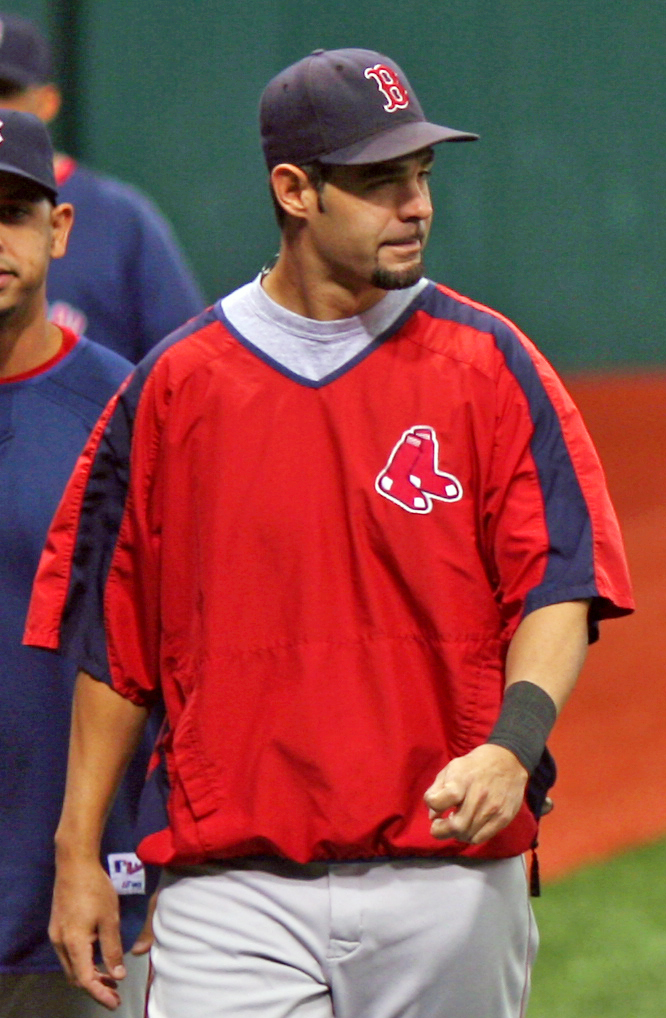
Mike Lowell
Class of 1997
MLB baseball player

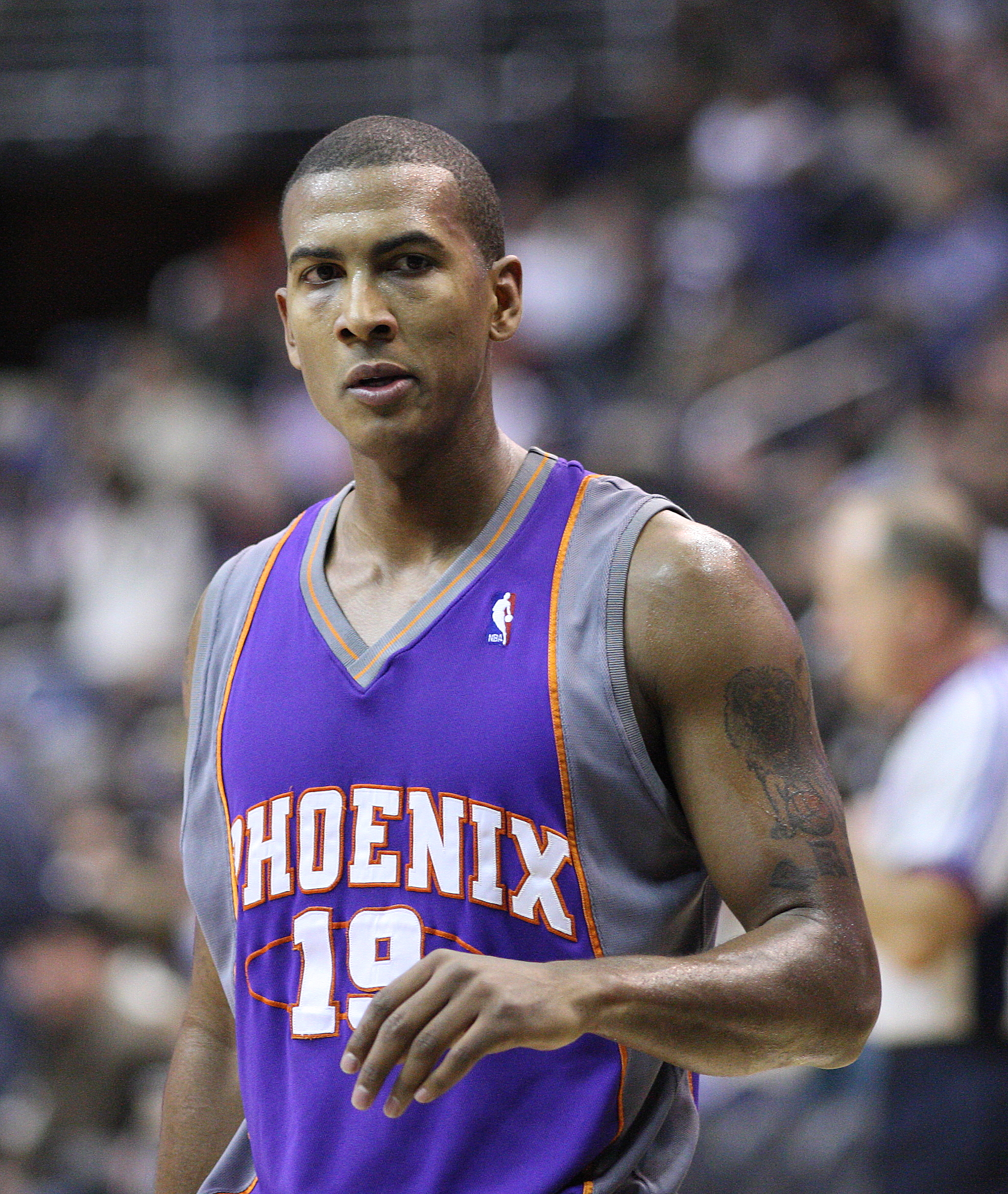
Raja Bell
Class of 1999
NBA basketball player

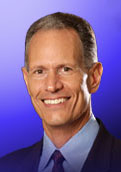
Carlos Álvarez
Class of 1974
6th mayor of Miami-Dade County

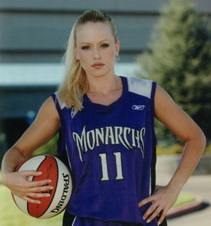
Andrea Nagy
Class of 1995
WNBA basketball player

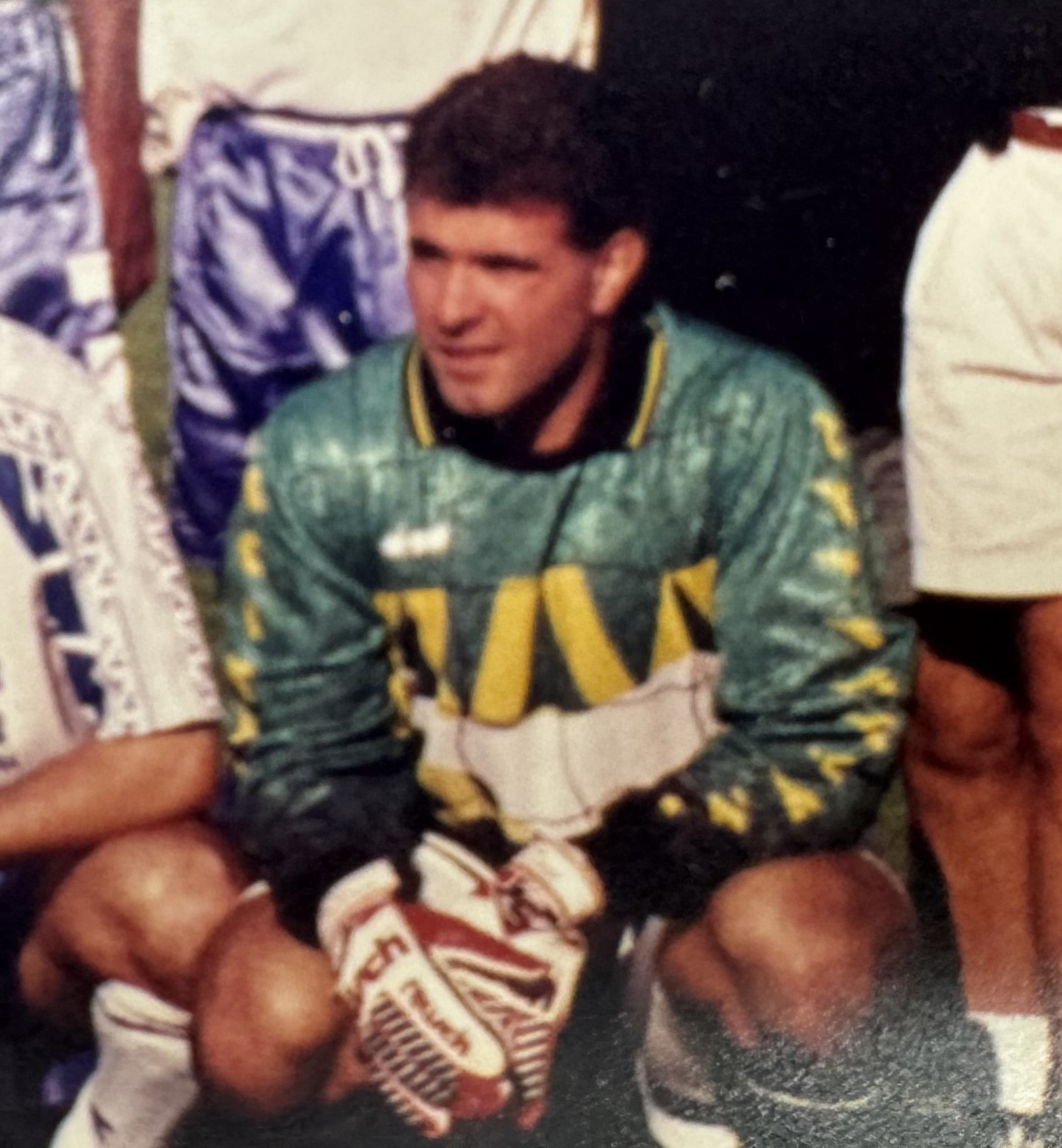
Chris Antonopoulos Class of 1990
Soccer player and coach

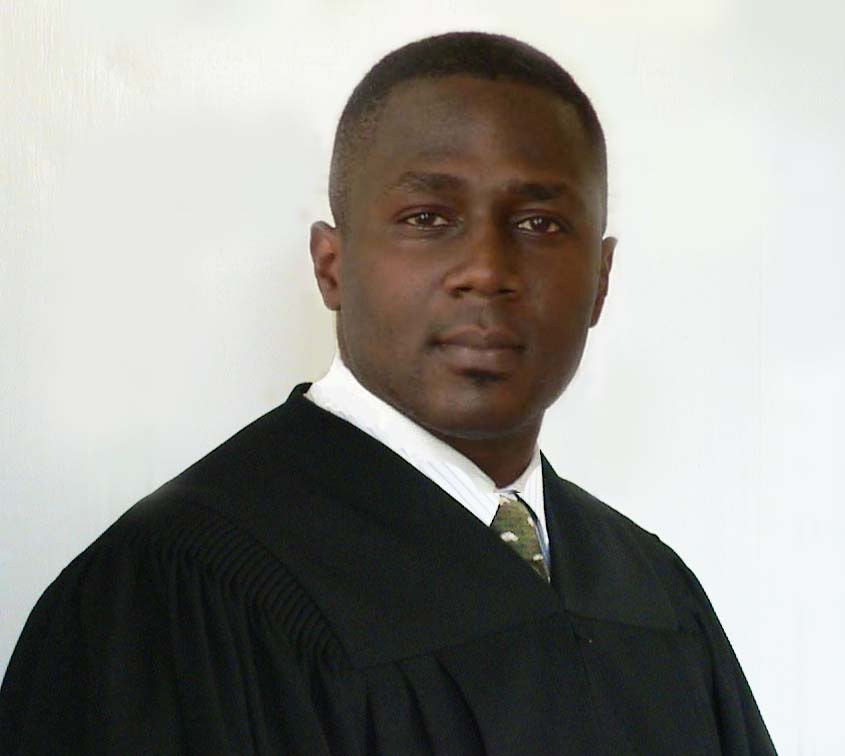
Ian Richards
Class of 1999
County court judge of Florida's 17th Judicial Circuit

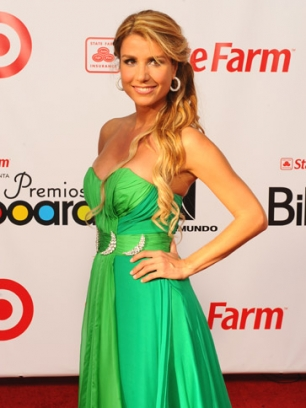
Elizabeth Pérez
Class of 2004
Emmy-winning television journalist and presenter

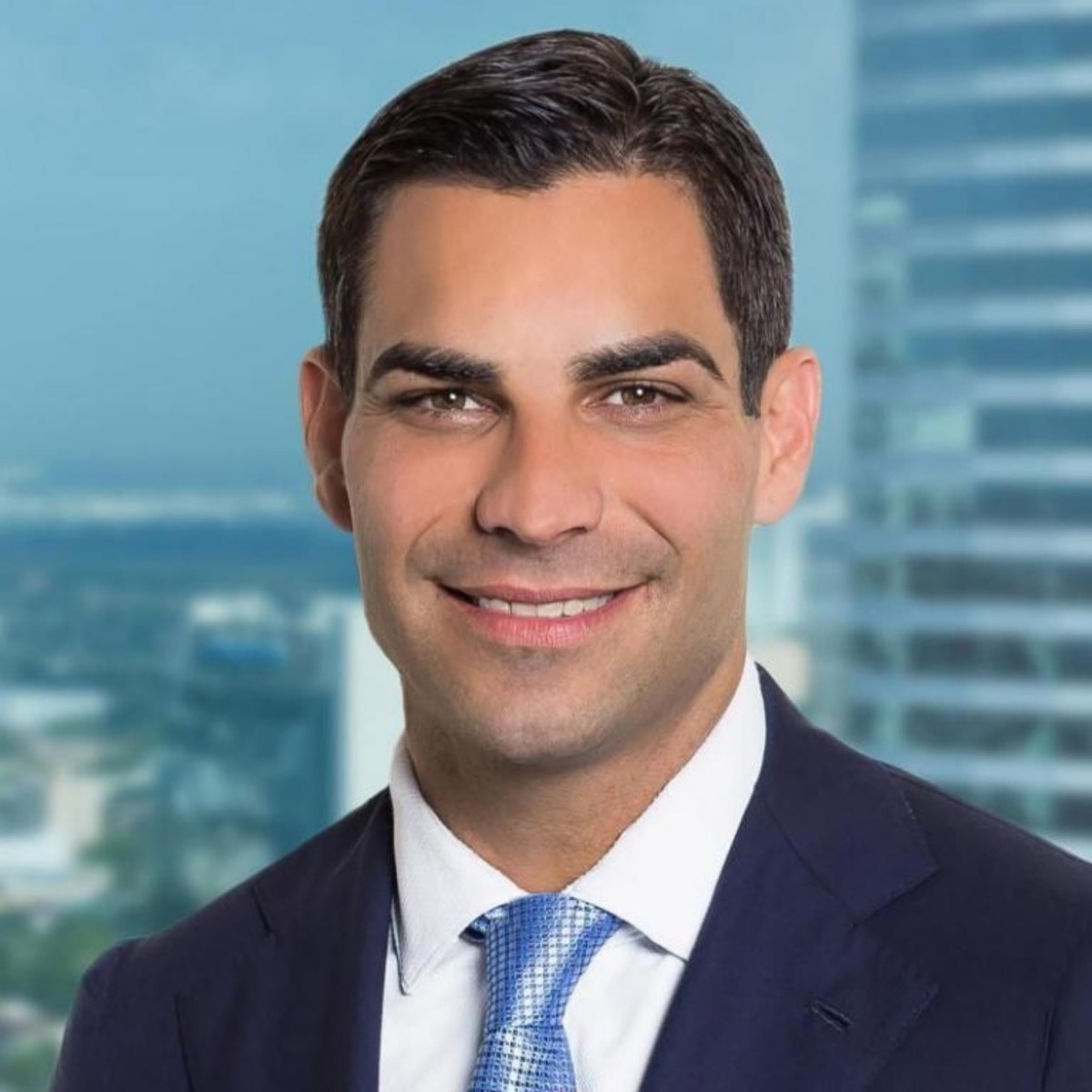
Francis Suarez
Class of 2001
43rd mayor of Miami

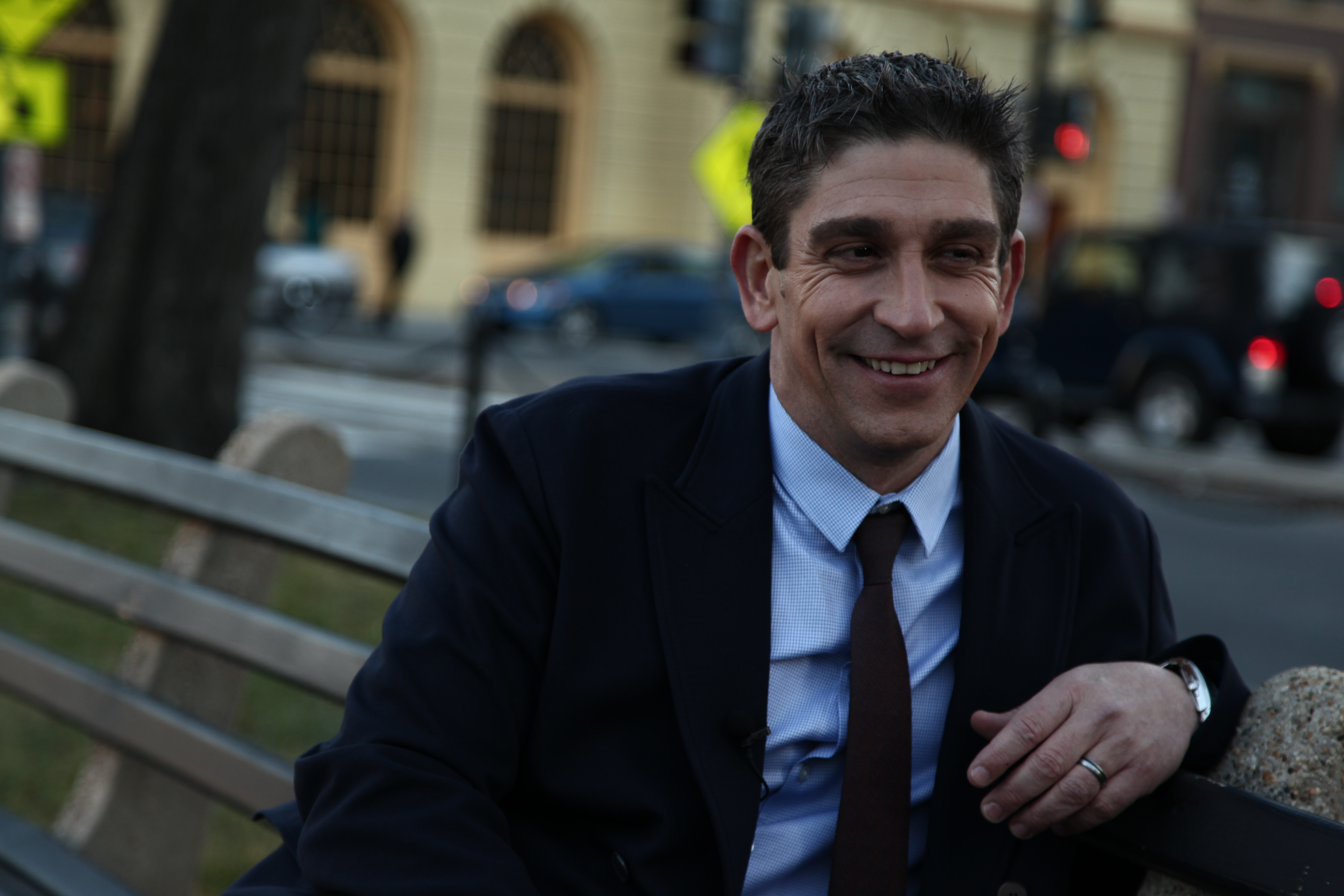
Richard Blanco
Class of 1991
2013 inaugural poet and award-winning author

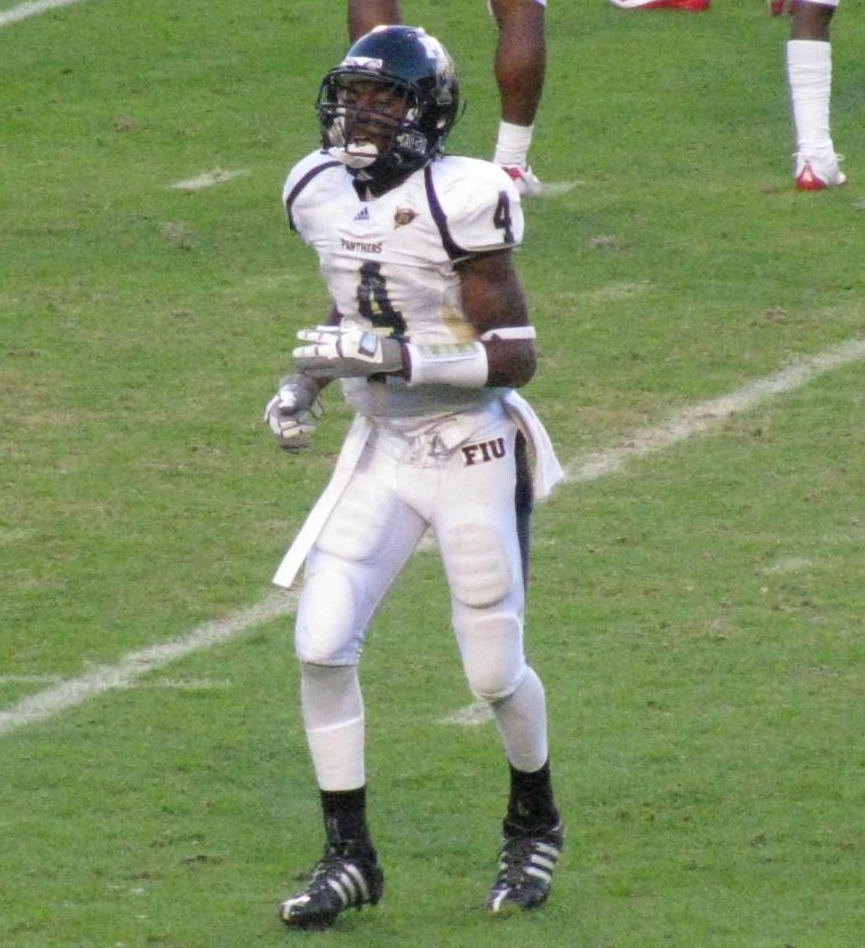
T. Y. Hilton
Class of 2012
NFL football player

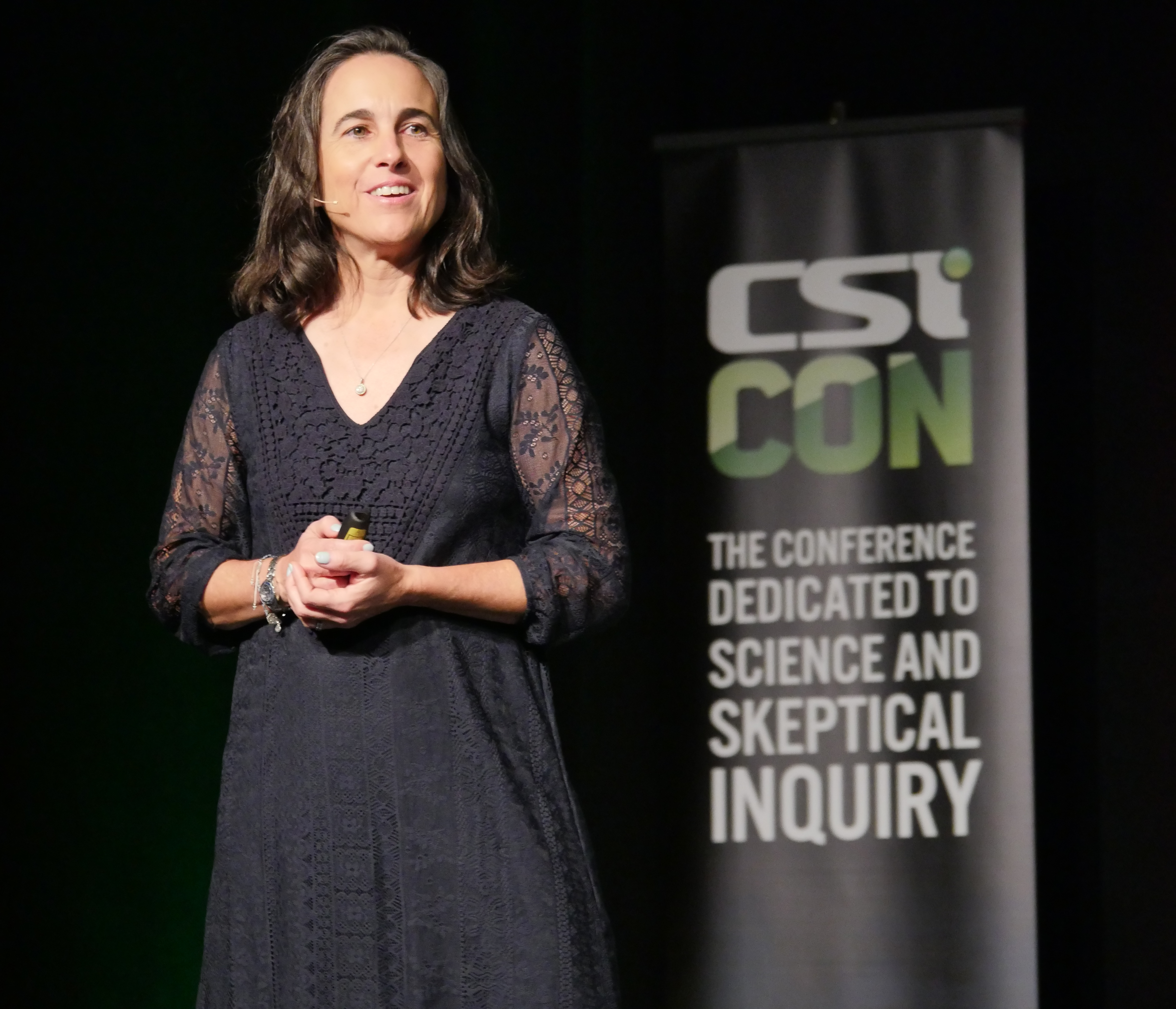
Bertha Vazquez
Class of 1999
Science teacher and director of the Teacher Institute for Evolutionary Science

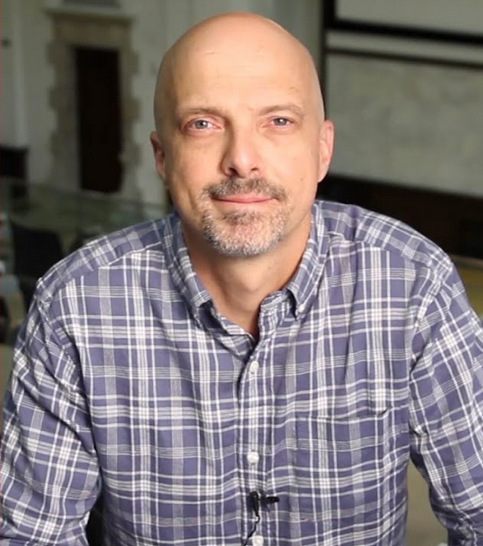
Carl Weems
Class of 1999
Psychologist
