= List of Florida International University people =

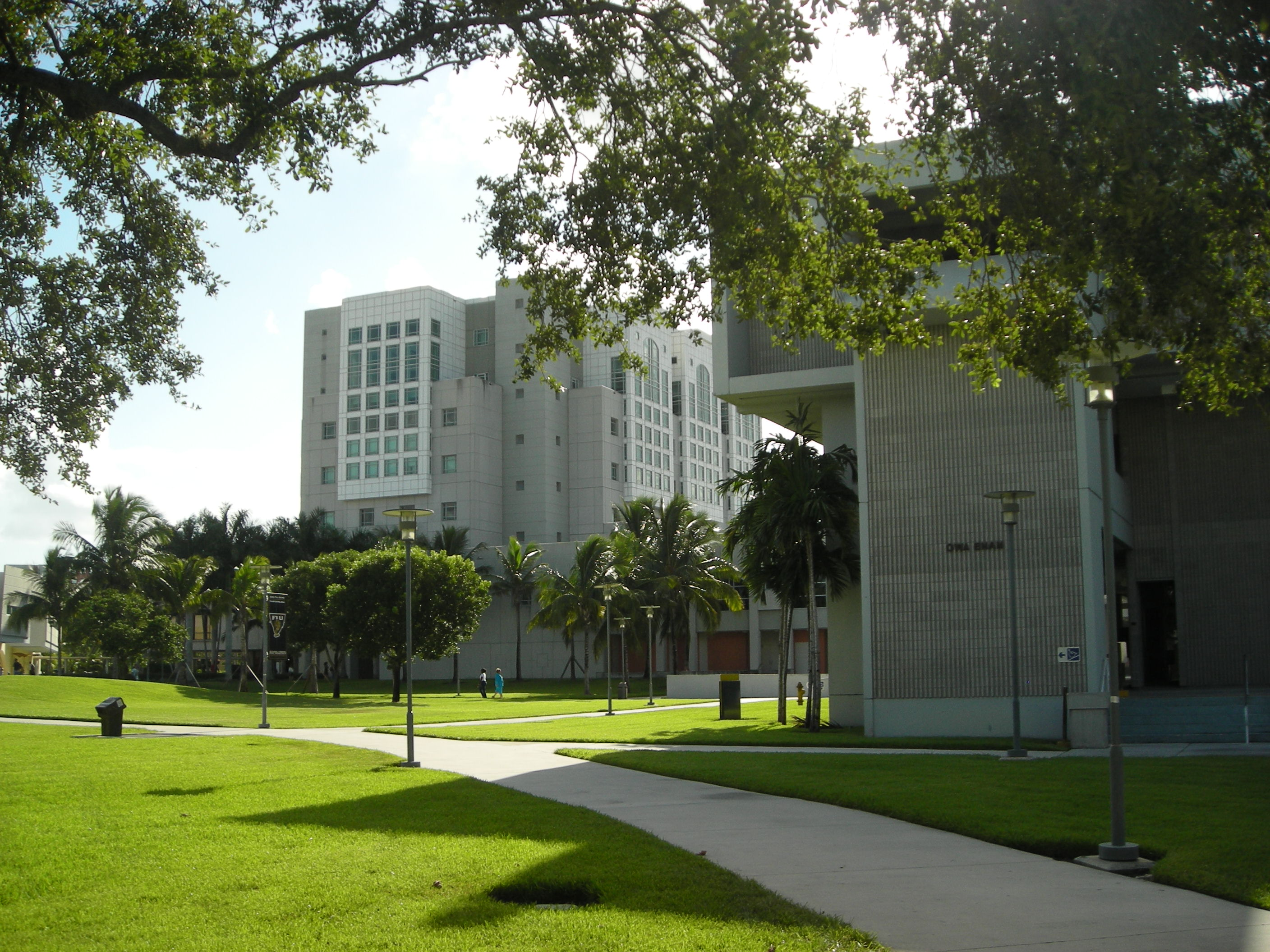
View of the FIU campus towards Green Library

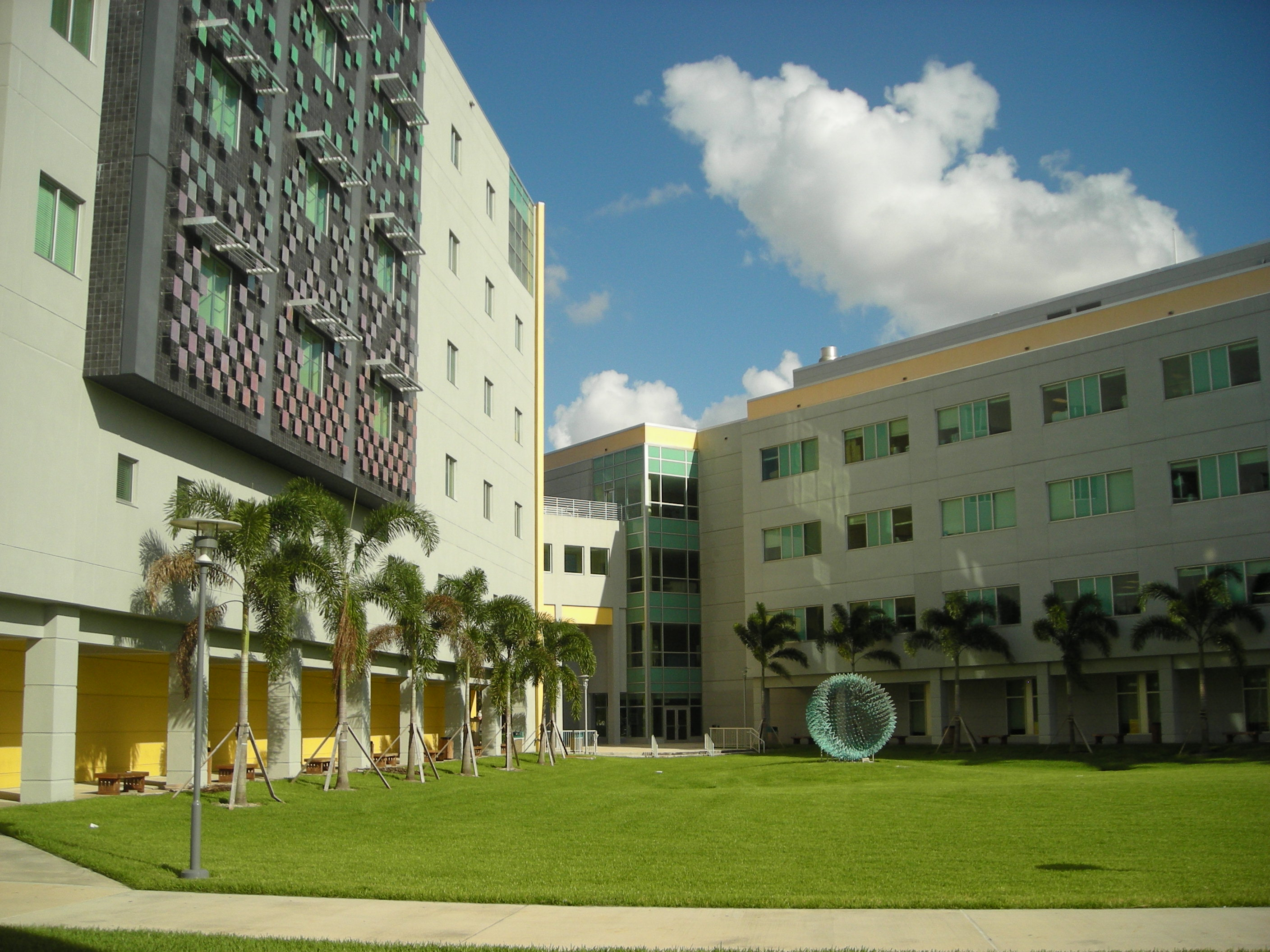
Health and Life Sciences buildings, home of the FIU College of Medicine

This list of notable Florida International University alumni includes alumni, faculty, and presidents of Florida International University in Miami, Florida, which includes 26 colleges and schools.

== Alumni ==
=== Sports ===
==== Baseball ====
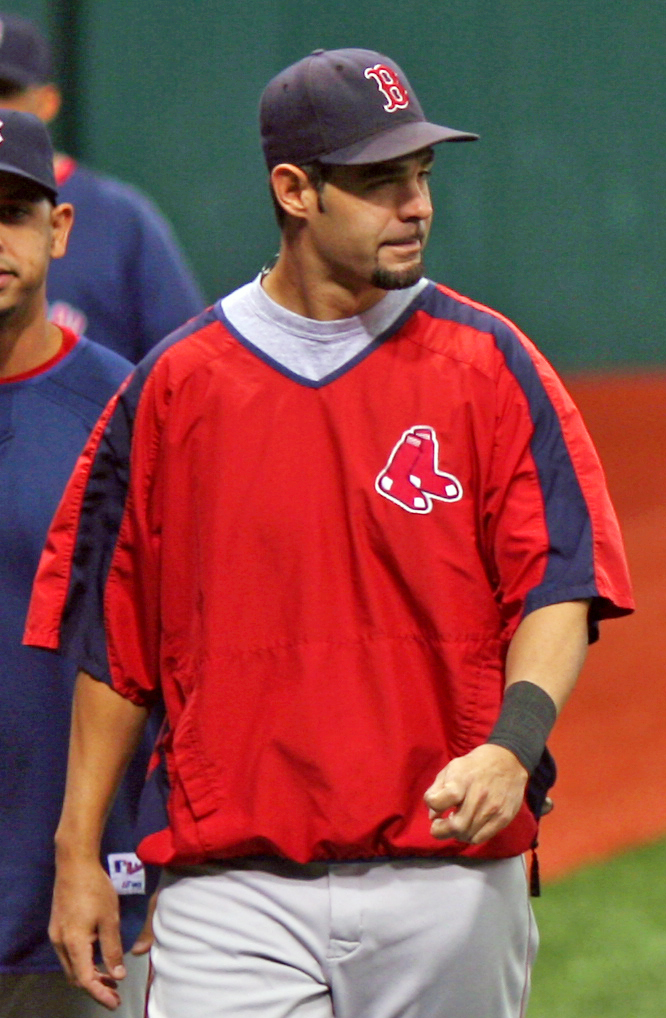
Mike Lowell

Athlete	Notability
Brad Eldred	professional MLB baseball player
Mike Lowell	professional MLB baseball player
Garrett Wittels	professional baseball player; 56-game college hitting streak

==== Basketball ====
Athlete	Notability
Oren Aharoni	Israeli basketball coach and former Israeli Basketball Premier League basketball player
Carlos Arroyo	professional NBA and Israeli Basketball Premier League basketball player
Raja Bell	professional NBA basketball player
Rakeem Buckles	professional Israeli Basketball Premier League basketball player
Denver Jones	professional Israeli Basketball Premier League basketball player
Andrea Nagy	professional WNBA basketball player

==== Equestrian ====
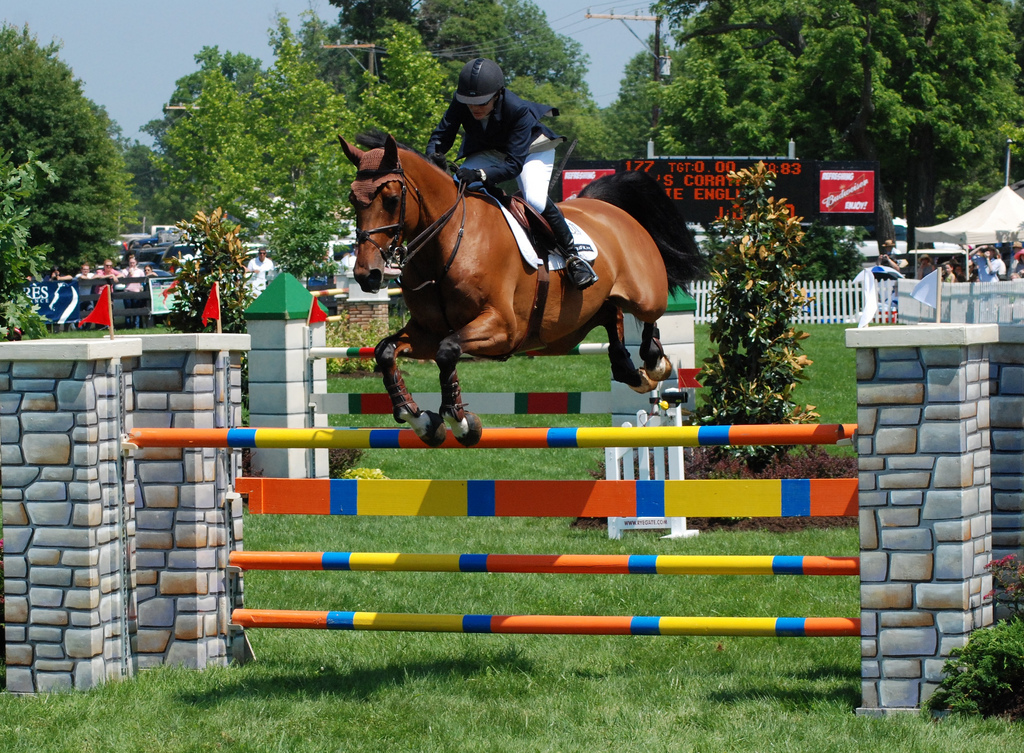
Margie Goldstein-Engle

Athlete	Notability
Margie Goldstein-Engle	equestrian

==== Football ====
Athlete	Notability
Antwan Barnes	NFL pro football player, free agent
Johnathan Cyprien	NFL pro football player, Tennessee Titans
Anthony Gaitor	NFL pro football player, Tampa Bay Buccaneers
T. Y. Hilton	NFL pro football player, Indianapolis Colts
Jonnu Smith	NFL pro football player, Miami Dolphins
Nick Turnbull	NFL pro football player, Atlanta Falcons
Tourek Williams	NFL pro football player, San Diego Chargers

==== Soccer ====
Athlete	Notability
Chris Antonopoulos	Former professional soccer player, Fort Lauderdale Strikers, USBeachMNT
Bobby Boswell	MLS professional soccer player, Houston Dynamo
Jeff Cassar	MLS professional soccer player, FC Dallas
Juan Francisco Guerra	Venezuelan First Division pro soccer player, New York Cosmos (2010)
Santiago Patiño	MLS professional soccer player, Orlando City
Steve Ralston	MLS professional soccer player, New England Revolution
Henry Westmoreland	retired professional soccer player

==== Track & field ====
Athlete	Notability
Ronald Forbes	Olympic athlete, 110m hurdles, Cayman Islands (2008, 2012, 2016)
Ena Guevara	Olympic athlete, marathon, Peru (1984, 1992)
Tayna Lawrence	Olympic athlete, 100 meters, Jamaica (2000, 2004)
Aubrey Smith	Olympic athlete, long jump, Canada (2016)

==== Other sports ====
- David Avellan, electrical engineering graduate, mixed martial artist
- Oumy Diop, French-Senegalese swimmer
- Steve Meister (born 1958), tennis player

=== Authors and entertainers ===
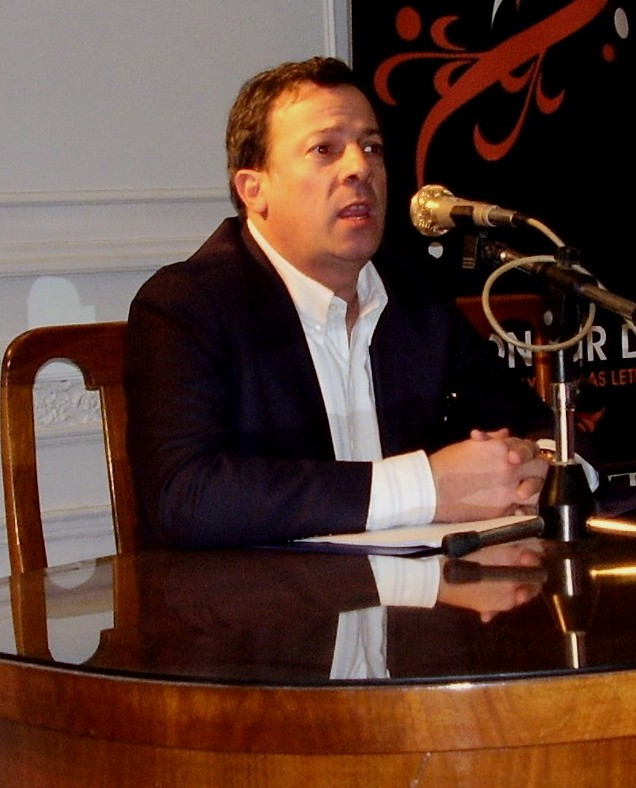
Carlos Alvarado-Larroucau

Alumnus	Notability
Carlos Alvarado-Larroucau	francophone writer, poet, essayist, professor
Liz Balmaseda	Pulitzer Prize-winning journalist
Steve Benen	political writer and contributor to and producer of The Rachel Maddow Show
Richard Blanco	inaugural poet, public speaker, author
Niala Boodhoo	journalist
Dennis Lehane	author of Mystic River
Ana Menendez	fiction author and journalist
Amy Serrano	filmmaker, author, public speaker
Javier Stanziola	author, playwright, theatre director

==== Visual artists ====
Alumnus	Notablity
Natalia Arbelaez	ceramicist, sculptor, and educator

==== Authors, actors, television, musicians ====
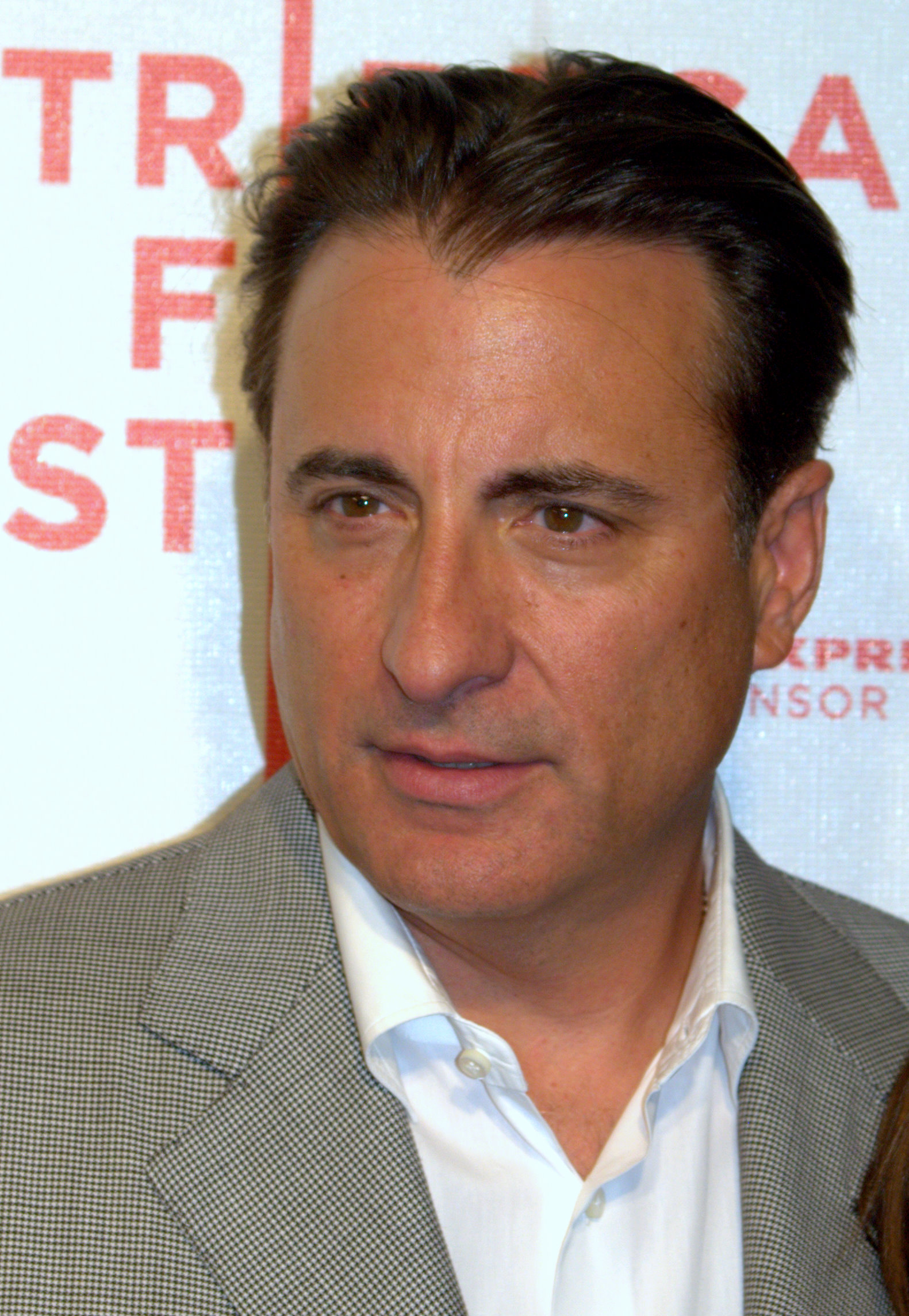
Andy Garcia

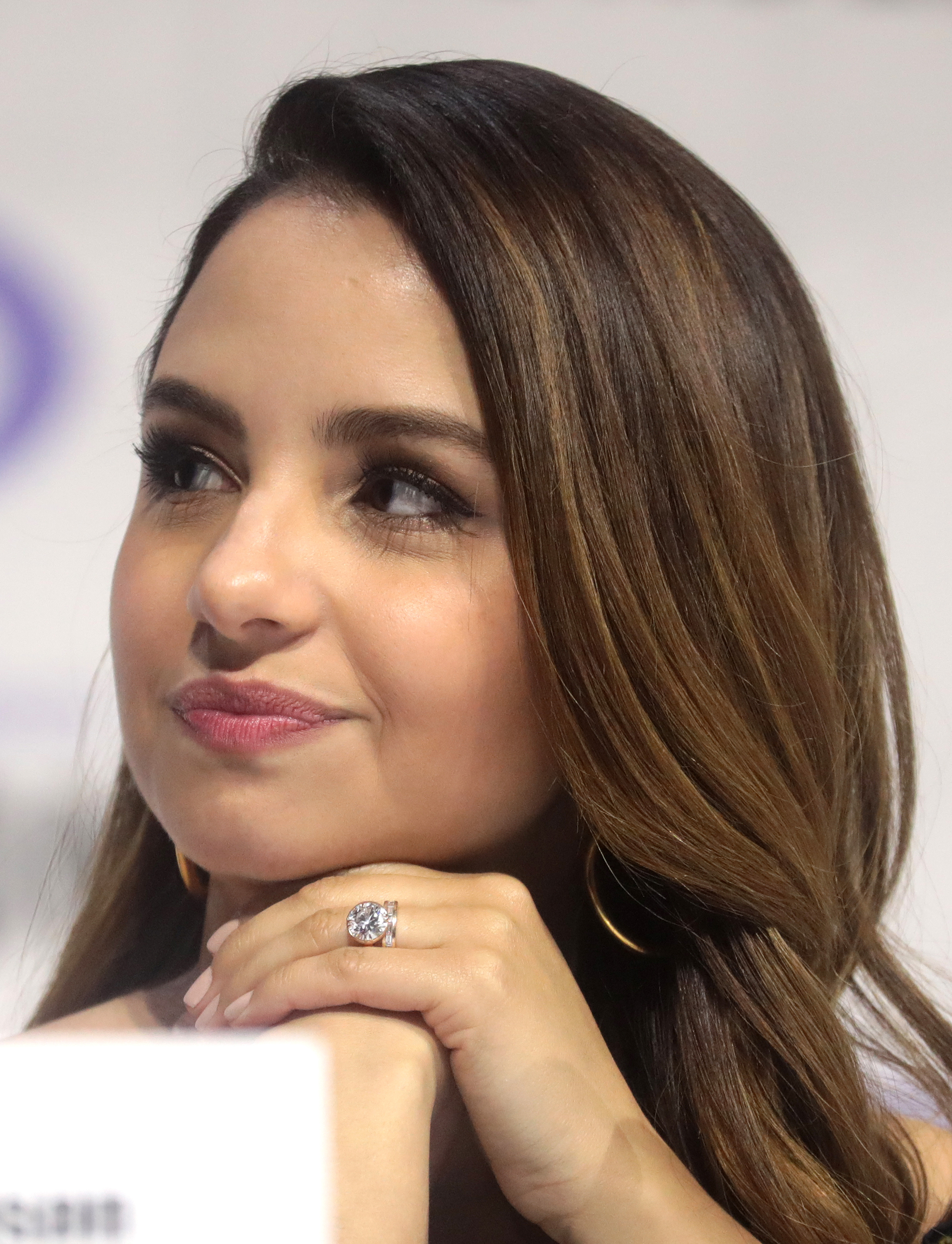
Aimee Carrero

Alumnus	Notability
Aimee Carrero	actress, Young & Hungry, Elena of Avalor
Janet Dacal	Broadway actress and singer, known for her role as Carla in In the Heights
Allie DiMeco	actress and musician, known for her role as Rosalina in Nickelodeon's The Naked Brothers Band
Athena Dion	drag queen
Andy García	Academy Award-nominated actor
Ricki Noel Lander	actress, fashion designer
Kimberly Leemans	model, America's Next Top Model contestant
Syesha Mercado	singer, American Idol contestant (Season 7)
Natalia Navarro	Miss Colombia 2009, placed 12th at Miss Universe 2010
Jackie Nespral	television anchor for WTVJ, the Miami-Fort Lauderdale affiliate of NBC
Dawn Ostroff	chief content officer and advertising business officer of Spotify
Danny Pino	actor, Law & Order: Special Victims Unit on NBC
Carlos Rafael Rivera	Emmy-winning and nominated film and television composer
Tony Succar	musician, songwriter, percussionist and producer, Latin Grammy Award nominee and winner
Nadia Turner	singer, American Idol contestant (Season 4)
Henry Vega	composer, musician
Vijay Yesudas	South Indian singer

=== Culinary ===
Alumnus	Notability
Tam Pham	Michelin Guide Florida 2024 Young Chef Award winner

=== Entertainment ===
Alumnus	Notability
Dawn Ostroff	president of Entertainment, CW Television Network
Elizabeth Perez	Emmy-winning television journalist and presenter, CNN en Español
Steve Tello	television executive, senior vice president and general manager of Fox Sports Florida

=== Law and politics ===
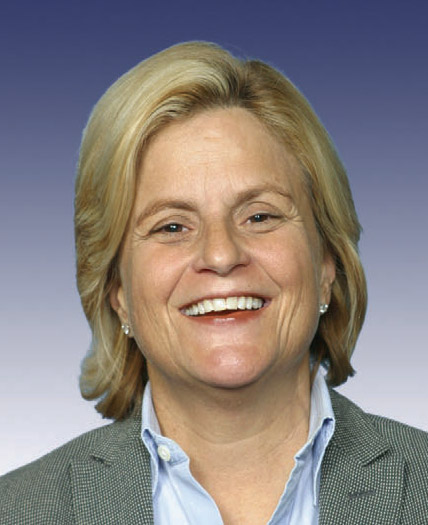
Congresswoman Ros-Lehtinen

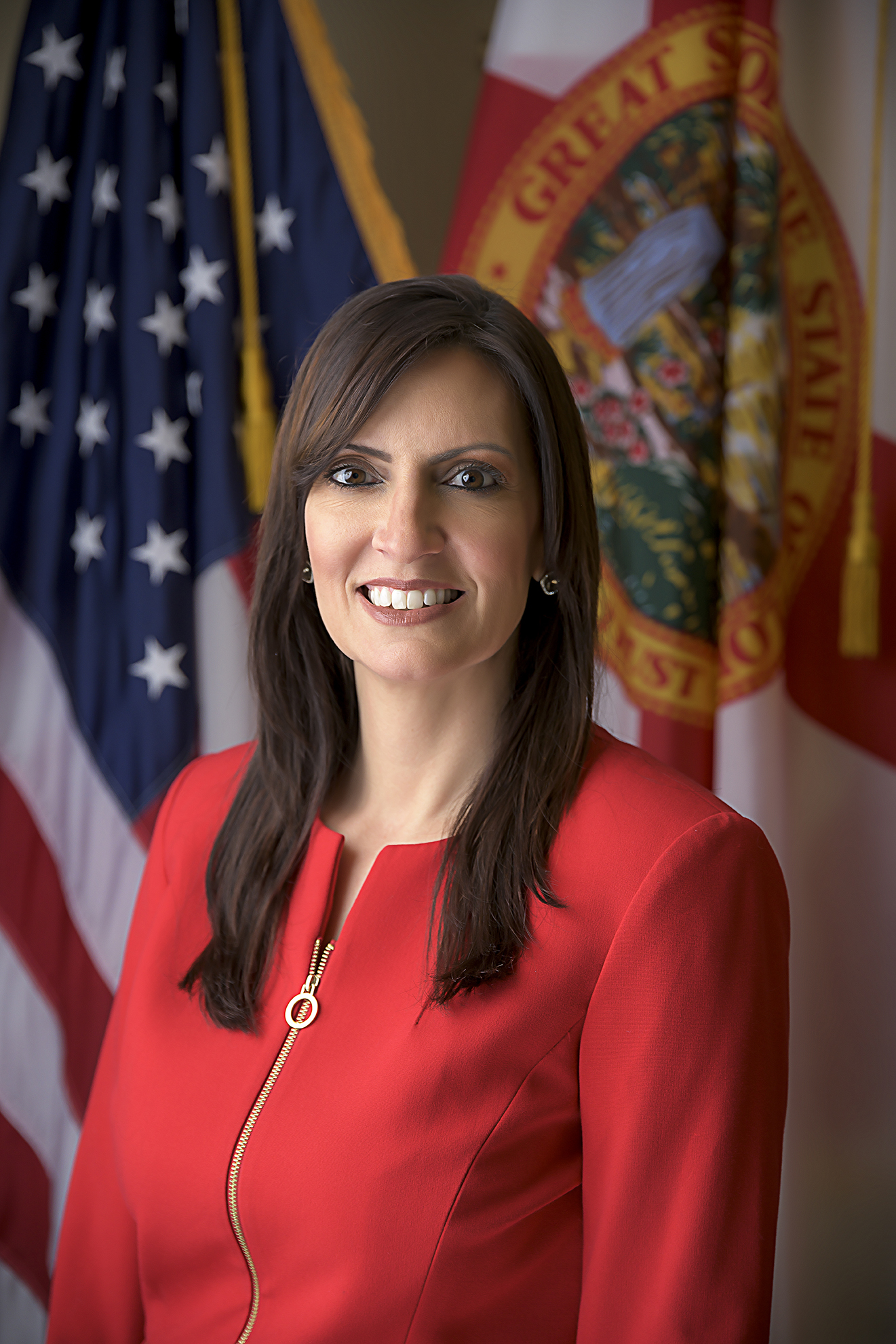
Lt. Governor Nuñez

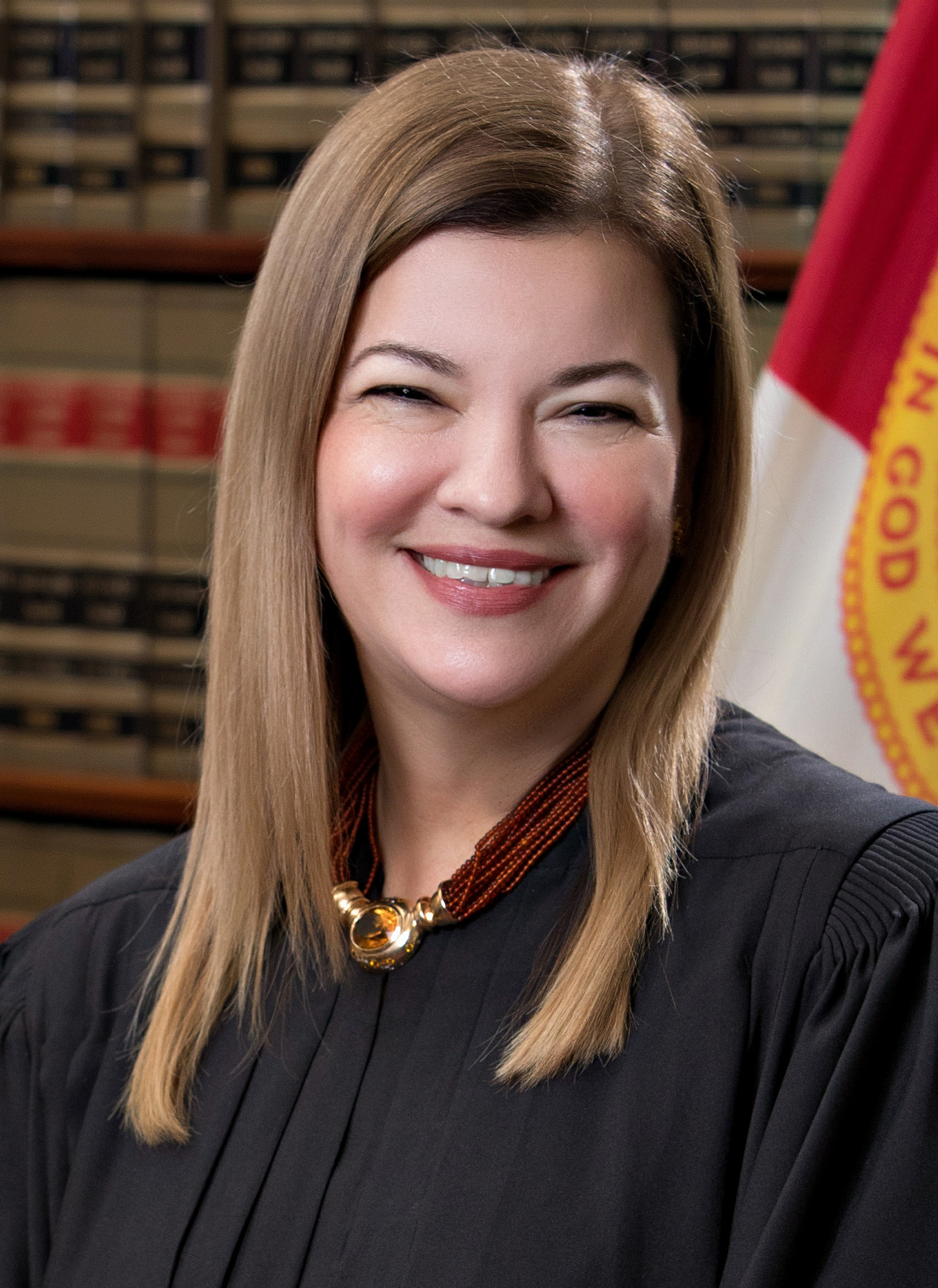
Justice Lagoa

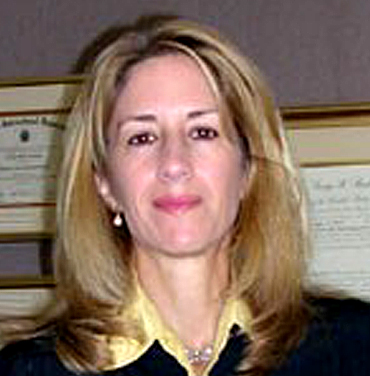
Judge Altonaga

==== House of Representatives, U.S. court judges ====
Alumnus	Notability
Cecilia Altonaga	U.S. district court judge (first Cuban-American woman appointed)
Barbara Lagoa	U.S. circuit judge for the 11th Circuit and former justice of the Supreme Court of Florida (first Hispanic justice on the Supreme Court of Florida)
David Rivera	Florida's 25th Congressional District
Ileana Ros-Lehtinen	member of the United States House of Representatives and first Hispanic from South Florida

==== State and local politics ====
Alumnus	Notability
Carlos Álvarez	6th mayor of Miami-Dade County
Bryan Avila	member of the Florida House of Representatives for district 111
Manny Diaz	41st mayor of Miami, chair of the Florida Democratic Party
Katie Edwards	member of the Florida House of Representatives for district 98
Anitere Flores	member of the Florida Senate for district 37
Rene Garcia	member of the Florida Senate for district 38
Jeanette Nuñez	member of the Florida House of Representatives for district 119; 20th lieutenant governor of Florida
Mark Pafford	member of the Florida House of Representatives for district 86
Kirill Reznik	member of the Maryland House of Delegates for district 39
Ian Richards	former county court judge in the Florida's 17th Judicial Circuit (first African-American judge to be elected countywide in Broward County)
Evelyn Sanguinetti	47th lieutenant governor of Illinois
Francis Suarez	43rd and current mayor of Miami

==== Foreign governments ====
Kim Simplis Barrow

Alumnus	Notability
Montse Alvarado	Prefect of the Dicastery for Communication of the Holy See
Patrece Charles-Freeman	Jamaican public and environmental health consultant, former executive director of the Jamaica Anti-Doping Commission, political candidate with the Jamaica Labour Party
Danny Danon	Israeli politician and chairman of the U.N. Legal Committee
Kim Simplis Barrow	Belizean activist, philanthropist, and spouse of the 4th prime minister of Belize
Richie Sookhai	Trinidadian and Tobagonian politician, engineer and businessman; current government senator and former president of the Chaguanas Chamber of Industry and Commerce (CCIC)

=== Education ===
Alumnus	Notability
Elsa Murano	former president of Texas A&M University in College Station, Texas
Carmen Reinhart	Minos A. Zombanakis Professor of the International Financial System at Harvard Kennedy School; World Bank chief economist
Bertha Vazquez	director of education for the Center for Inquiry, director of the Teacher Institute for Evolutionary Science (TIES), and science teacher at the George Washington Carver Middle School

=== Science ===
Alumnus	Notability
Edith Kellnhauser	German nursing scientist, educator, and writer (1933–2019)
James F. O'Brien	professor at UC-Berkeley, has patents pending for his explosive computer animation techniques
David Shor	data scientist (1991–)

== Faculty ==
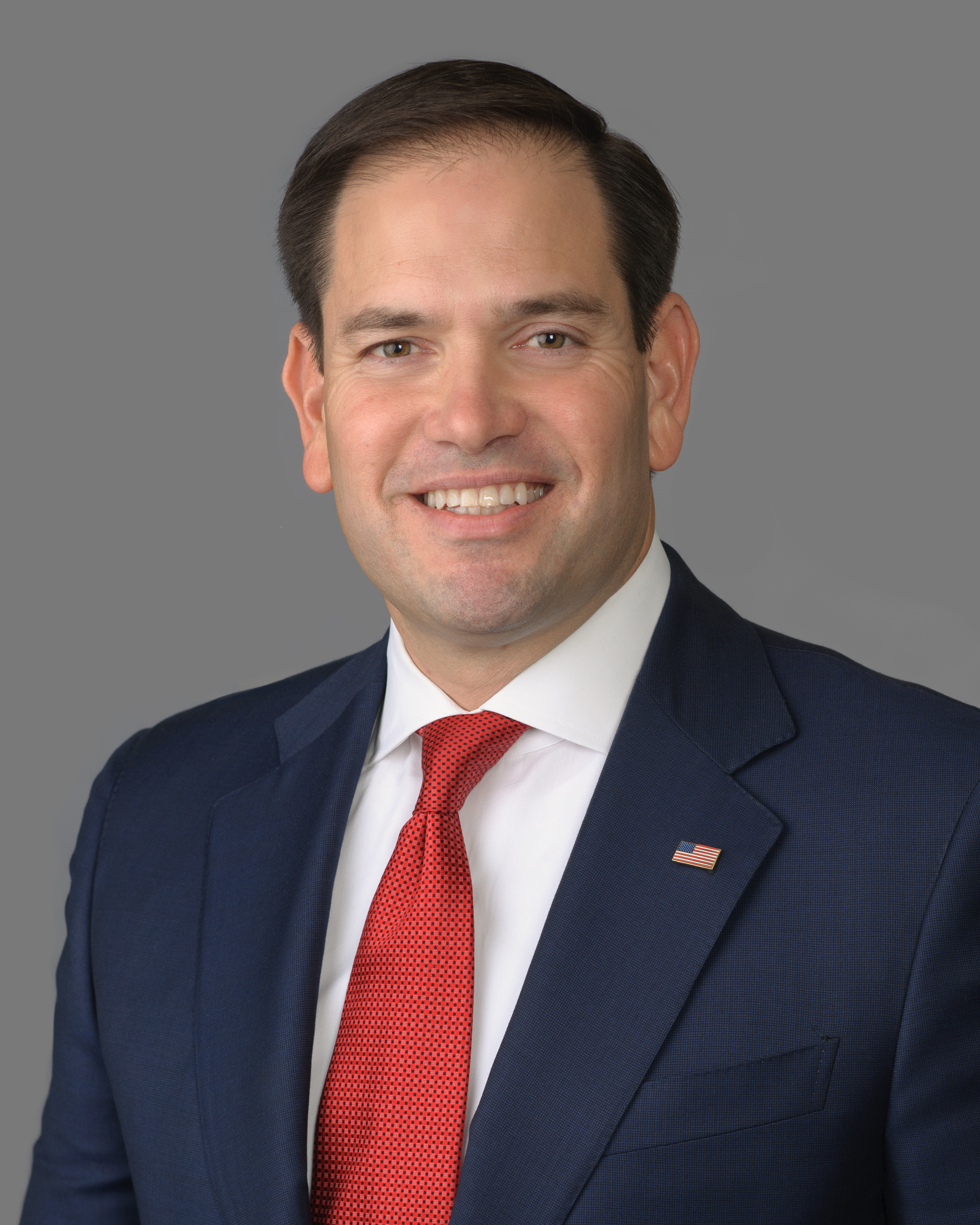
Marco Rubio

- Irtishad Ahmad, professor and chairperson of Florida International University Department of Construction Management and editor in chief of the Journal of Management in Engineering, ASCE
- Thomas E. Baker, professor of constitutional law in the College of Law
- Lynne Barrett, professor of English and founder of Gulf Stream Magazine
- Rita Buck-Crockett, assistant athletic director, head volleyball and beach volleyball coach
- Stephan Charman, associate professor of psychology
- William Darrow, professor of public health
- John Dufresne, professor of creative writing, editor of Gulf Stream Magazine, author
- Penelope Easton, professor of dietetics and nutrition in the Robert Stempel College of Public Health and Social Work
- Elizabeth Price Foley, professor of law in the College of Law
- Edgar Fuller, professor of mathematics and statistics
- Orlando Jacinto García, professor of music and director of the Composition Program for the School of Music
- Steven Heine, professor of religion and history; director of the Institute for Asian Studies
- Mark Hetzler, professor of music and orchestra
- Sundaraja Sitharama Iyengar, professor of computer science in the College of Engineering and Computing
- Maureen Kenny, professor of psychology in the Department of Psychology
- Abraham Lavender, professor of sociology; president of the Society for Crypto-Judaic Studies
- Stephen Leatherman, director of the FIU Coastal Research Lab, nicknamed "Dr. Beach" for his annual ratings of American beaches (issued every Memorial Day weekend)
- Zaida Morales-Martínez, professor emeritus of chemistry
- Bruce Nissen, professor of labor studies and director of research at the Center for Labor Research and Studies and director of the FIU Research Institute on Social and Economic Policy
- Ronni Reis, tennis coach
- Stewart Robertson, professor of orchestral studies and conductor of the FIU Symphony Orchestra
- Marco Rubio, adjunct professor of politics and international relations at Steven J. Green School of International and Public Affairs

== University presidents ==
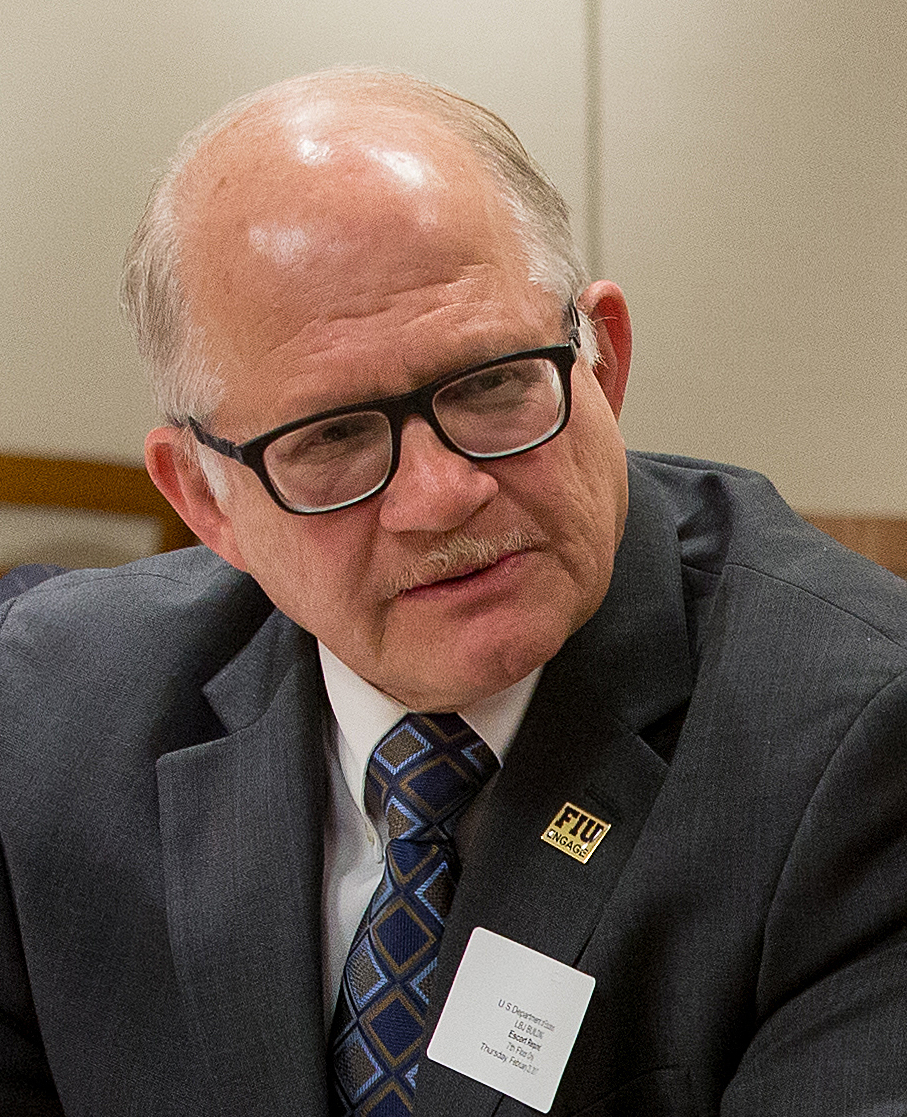
Mark B. Rosenberg

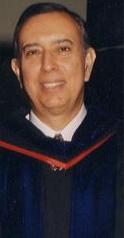
Modesto A. Maidique

President	Tenure
Charles Perry	1965–1976
Harold Crosby	1976–1979
Gregory Baker Wolfe	1979–1986
Modesto A. Maidique	1986–2009
Mark B. Rosenberg	2009–2022
Kenneth A. Jessell	2022–2025
Jeanette Nuñez	2025–present
