= Fenton Ferguson =

Jamaican politician and dental surgeon

The Honorable Dr. Fenton Ferguson CD MP

Minister of Health
- In office 2012–2015
- Preceded by: Rudyard Spencer
- Succeeded by: Horace Dalley

Minister of Labour and Social Security
- In office November 2015 – March 2016
- Prime Minister: Portia Simpson-Miller

MP for Saint Thomas Eastern
- In office 1993–2010

Personal details
- Party: PNP
- Education: Ardenne High School; Howard University (BSc; Howard University College of Medicine (DDS)

Fenton Rudyard Ferguson CD is a Jamaican politician with the People's National Party. He began serving as Jamaica's Minister of labor and social security under Prime Minister Portia Simpson-Miller in 2012. He is a dental surgeon. Fenton Ferguson was the MP for Saint Thomas Eastern. His opponent in 2016 was Mr. Delano Seiveright. Ferguson was moved to labor and social security after he remarked that babies who died as a result of the Klebsiella outbreak in 2015 at Victoria Jubilee Hospital are “not babies in the real sense” during his tenure as Minister of Health when many premature babies died from that bacteria.

== Career ==
Ferguson was elected to Parliament in 1993 from East St. Thomas, defeating Pearnel Charles of the Jamaica Labour Party and ending the JLP's 45-year hold on the constituency. He was elected a vice-president of the People's National Party in 2006 along with Angela Brown-Burke, Derrick Kellier, and Peter Phillips, beating out Sharon Hay-Webster, Louis Moyston and Kern Spencer. He faced Charles' daughter Patrece Charles-Freeman in the 2011 election in the same East St. Thomas constituency, defeating her by 8,018 votes to 7,547. On September 3, 2020, parliamentary elections, Ferguson lost his seat to Dr. Michelle Charles, the daughter of Pearnel Charles Sr and brother of Pearnel Charles Jr. For the first time ever a brother and sister pair sat in Gordon House.

== Personal life ==
Ferguson attended Ardenne High School in Kingston before moving to the United States to attend Howard University, where he earned a B.Sc. in chemistry in 1974. His sister, Dr. Millicent A. Comrie, specializes in obstetrics and gynecology at Maimonides Medical Center in Brooklyn, NY.
