= Pearnel =

Pearnel is a given name. Notable people with the name include:

- Pearnel Charles (born 1936), Jamaican politician
- Pearnel Patroe Charles Jr. (born 1978), Jamaican politician
