= Clarendon South Eastern =

Parliamentary constituency of Jamaica

Clarendon South East is a parliamentary constituency represented in the House of Representatives of the Jamaican Parliament. It elects one Member of Parliament (MP) by the first past the post system of election. It is located in Clarendon Parish. The current MP is Pearnel Charles Jr, son of Pearnel Charles.

== Representation ==
=== 20th-century ===
- Hugh Shearer (until 1993)
- Peter Bunting (30 March 1993 – 18 December 1998)
- Basil Burrell (from 1998)
- Rudyard Spencer (from 2002 to February 2020)
- Pearnel Patroe Charles Jr. (March 2020 - present)
