= James A. Robinson (disambiguation) =

James A. Robinson (born 1960) is a British economist and political scientist.

James A. Robinson may also refer to:

- James A. Robinson (American political scientist) (1932–2018), American political scientist
- J-Ro (born 1973; as James Anthony Robinson), U.S. hiphop artist

== See also ==
- James Robinson (disambiguation)
