= Stennett H. Brooks =

Nicaraguan Seventh-day Adventist leader

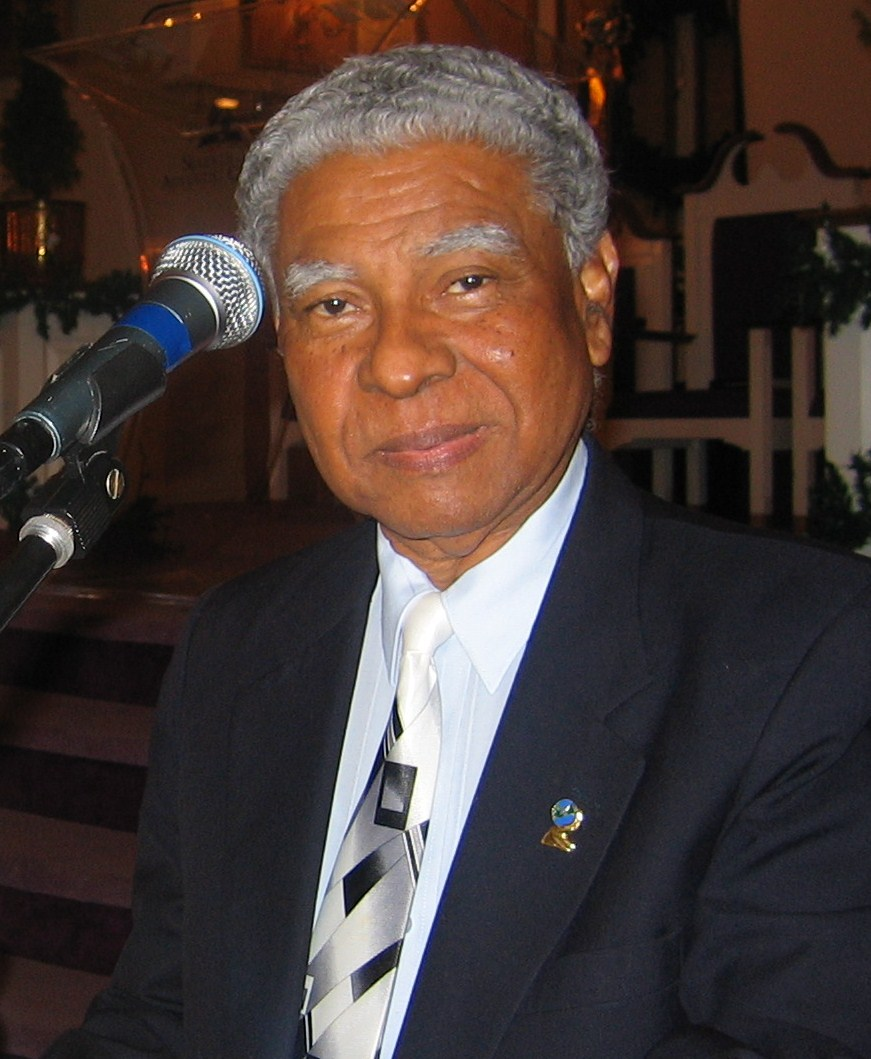
Stennett H. Brooks

Stennett H. Brooks was a pastor and the former president of the Northeastern Conference of Seventh-Day Adventist Churches. Prior to becoming the president, Brooks served as treasurer for more than 20 years. Brooks died of injuries sustained in a car accident on April 4, 2008. He received the United Negro College Fund Distinguished Alumnus Award that same year.

== Early life and education ==
Stennett H. Brooks was born July 19, 1932, to Roger and Jelina Brooks in Puerto Cabezas, Nicaragua. The oldest of six children, three of whom preceded him in death, Brooks attended school in Panama, Jamaica, and New York City before enrolling at Oakwood College in Huntsville, Alabama.

== Career and personal life ==
While in Jamaica, Brooks worked with the West Jamaica Conference of Seventh-Day Adventists as an accountant, bookstore assistant manager, and member of a singing quartet. In 1959, Stennett married Erma R. Parchment. They moved to New York, where he joined the staff of the Northeastern Conference of Seventh-Day Adventist. They had three daughters, Andrea, Audra, and Amalia.

After continuing his education at Oakwood, Brooks returned to the Northeastern Conference and served as the conference's accountant, secretary-treasurer and treasurer before becoming conference president. As president, Brooks oversaw the construction of a nursing home, senior citizen housing, the Northeastern Conference Headquarters building, the purchase of a high school and the development of a campsite. In addition to his work at the Northeastern Conference, he loved to travel. He was certified as a cruise counselor by the Cruise Lines International Association and was a member of the American Society of Travel Agents and its Industrial Committee.

Brooks died April 4, 2008, of injuries sustained in an automobile accident.

== Honors and awards ==
Brooks was honored by the United Negro College Fund as the 2008 Distinguished Alumnus.UNCF Announces 2008 Annual Award Recipients He had been a member of the Greater New York Inter-Alumni Council/UNCF for over ten years and has served as the Annual Dinner Journal Committee Chair and Chaplain. He was also the president of the A. Samuel Rashford chapter of the Oakwood University Alumni Association and was recently elected president of the New York Chapter of the Northern Caribbean University Alumni Association.

== See also ==
- Seventh-day Adventist Church
- Seventh-day Adventist theology
- Seventh-day Adventist eschatology
- History of the Seventh-day Adventist Church
- 28 Fundamental Beliefs
- Teachings of Ellen G. White
- Inspiration of Ellen G. White
- Prophecy in the Seventh-day Adventist Church
- Investigative judgment
- Pillars of Adventism
- Second Coming
- Conditional Immortality
- Historicism
- Three Angels' Messages
- Sabbath in seventh-day churches
- Ellen G. White
- Adventism
- Seventh-day Adventist worship
