= Albert Vrana =

American sculptor

A section of Vrana's "Evolution of Government" displayed on the Charles E. Bennett Federal Building in Jacksonville, Florida

Albert Vrana (1921–1994) was an American sculptor who is best known for his mid-twentieth century monumental architectural sculptures done in the Modernist style, using novel materials, such as ferrocement, and new techniques, such as sand casting using plastic Styrofoam molds to shape sculptural concrete panels and metal sculptures.

== Career ==
Much of his work was commissioned at a time when quality sculpture in front of a building was the sign of a prestige property, according to Vrana, and many of his sculptures are located in outdoor settings, primarily in Florida and the American Southeast.

His sculptural forms are integrated with the shape of the built environment where they were to be set, such as residential complexes, government office parks, university campuses, etc.

Although many of his pieces were Modernist, he considered his approach to be traditional; much of his work was "integrated as part of the structure and related to the specific building in both design and materials, in harmony, not conflict, with the architecture". This approach has had resonance with the current interest in creating, producing and installing site specific art.

Paul Zarinski, noted artist, author and emeritus professor of art at the University of Connecticut, makes note of Vrana's esthetic in the shaping of three-dimensional space and its integration with the built environment and especially Vrana's ability to form connections between design "professions such as architectural engineering and industrial design and the three-dimensional art and design". His work and its composition with regard to structures, with modular units and repetition, and with bas-relief is considered "both sculpture and structure"—especially in the six-story Professional Arts Building in Miami which consists of 200 pre-cast wall panels made with Lehigh cement which has been described as "the world's largest non-repetitive concrete bas relief". His work has been compared to that of Le Corbusier, Moshe Safdie, Frank Lloyd Wright and Buckminster Fuller for its repetitive use of modular units, while his work with relief carvings is considered along with that of Louise Nevelson in art and architecture books.

Art historian Kenneth Donahue, second Director of the Los Angeles County Museum of Art, noted that Vrana is unceasing in his investigation of space mass relations in both his monumental works and his small sculptures using new materials and techniques, some which he developed himself, to achieve a "fusion of sculpture and architecture in a manner rarely accomplished since the Baroque era".

== Notable works ==
=== Free standing sculptures ===
His free-standing "Obelisk" is a 50-ton, 60-foot high sculpture in bronze and ferrocement. According to Vrana "the sculptural forms which are cantilevered off the obelisk are stylized or abstract human forms, which relate to various artistic endeavors. A viewer can, with a moment of meditation, feel the association. This requires him to participate in the conception.". The Obelisk is located within the Arlen House residential complex located in the city of Sunny Isles Beach, Florida. The sculpture is located in front of the Arlen House originally built as a luxury rental property in the 1960s, and now a condominium.

Built as part of a luxury residential property, "Day and Night" (1964) located at the Alfred Browning Parker House in Coral Gables, Florida, consisted of a pair of pieces by two artists, with Vrana's sleeping man forming the Night portion.

=== Architectural sculpture ===
“The Story of Man" which forms the outside walls of the Rotunda at what was originally the Public Library in Miami Beach—now a structure that is part of the Bass Museum in Miami Beach—consists of sand-cast sculptured architectural panels that form the supporting walls of the building, as illustrated when the steps used in the building technique were documented by the Miami Beach City Clerk in a series of photographs taken as the work progressed in the 1960s.

Vrana was commissioned to create "Las Cuatro Razas" the sculptured mural that forms the façade of the Charles E. Perry Building at Florida International University in Miami and is intended to reflect that university's ethos of providing quality education to meet the needs of the diversity of Floridians

Other notable works include the "Evolution of Government" located at the Federal Building, Jacksonville, Florida.

== See also ==
- Further images of Vrana's "Evolution of Government" at Wikimedia Commons
