= Michelle Charles =

Jamaican politician

Dr. Michelle Charles MP

Member of Parliament
- In office 7 September 2020 – 3 September 2025
- Governor-General: Patrick Linton Allen
- Prime Minister: Andrew Holness
- Preceded by: Fenton Ferguson
- Succeeded by: Yvonne Shaw
- Constituency: Saint Thomas Eastern

Personal details
- Born: May 6, 1973 (age 53) St. Thomas, Jamaica
- Party: Jamaica Labour Party
- Relations: Pearnel Patroe Charles Jr. (brother)
- Parent: Pearnel Charles
- Education: Howard University College of Dentistry (DDS)

Michelle Charles is a politician who was a member of the Parliament of Jamaica.

== Political career ==
She defeated Fenton Ferguson in Saint Thomas Eastern at the 2020 general election. In the 2025 Jamaican general election, she was unseated by Yvonne Shaw.

== Personal life ==
She is daughter of former speaker Pearnel Charles. She is a dentist by profession.
