= 2020 Clarendon South Eastern by-election =

Election result for Clarendon South Eastern, Jamaica

- March 2, 2020

Constituency of Clarendon South Eastern
- Turnout: 18.65%
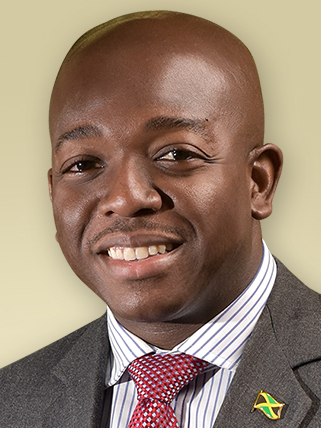
	First party	Second party
		Ind.
Candidate	Pearnel Charles Jr.	Dereck Lambert
Party	JLP	Independent
Popular vote	6,846	741
Percentage	90.23%	9.77%
MP before election
Rudyard Spencer
JLP
Elected MP
Pearnel Charles Jr.
JLP

A by-election to the Jamaican House of Representatives was held for the Clarendon South Eastern constituency on March 2, 2020. The seat was declared vacant due to the resignation of member of Parliament Rudyard Spencer on February 4, 2020. The election was won by Pearnel Charles Jr. of the Jamaica Labour Party.

== Background ==
The PNP did not contest the by-election.

== Dates ==
Date	Event
February 4, 2020	Rudyard Spencer resigned as member of Parliament
February 5, 2020	Writ of Election issued by Governor-General and announced by Prime Minister
February 12, 2020	Nomination day
March 2, 2020	Polling day

== Result ==
2020 Clarendon South Eastern by-election
Party	Candidate	Votes	%	±%
JLP	Pearnel Charles Jr.	6,846	90.23	
Independent	Dereck Lambert	741	9.77	
Rejected ballots		119	1.5	
Turnout		7,706	18.65	
Registered electors		41,308		
JLP hold				

Voting results
Jamaica Labour Party	90.23%
Independent	9.77%

Ballots
Valid votes	98.46%
Rejected ballots	1.54%

== See also ==
- Politics of Jamaica
- Elections in Jamaica
