= Pearnel Patroe Charles Jr. =

Jamaican politician

The Honourable Pearnel Charles Jr. MP JP
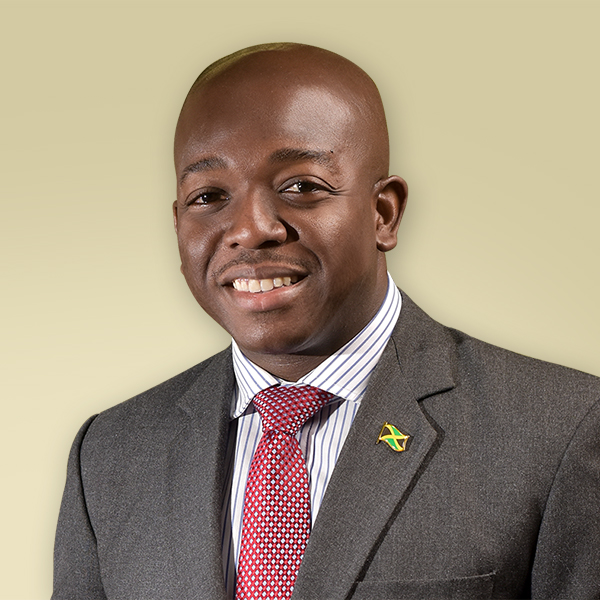
- Hon. Pearnel Charles Jr., MP

Minister of Labour and Social Security
- Incumbent
- Assumed office 22 May 2023
- Prime Minister: Andrew Holness

MP for Clarendon South Eastern
- Incumbent
- Assumed office 2020 Clarendon South Eastern by-election

Minister of National Security
- In office 2014–2016
- Prime Minister: Portia Simpson-Miller; Andrew Holness

Minister of Economic Growth and Job Creation
- In office 2018–2020
- Prime Minister: Andrew Holness

Personal details
- Born: September 5, 1978 (age 48)
- Party: Jamaica Labour Party
- Parent: Pearnel Charles (father) Gloria Charles (mother)
- Relatives: Michelle Charles (sister); Patrece Charles-Freeman (sister)
- Education: University of the West Indies, George Washington University Law School, Campion College

Pearnel Patroe Charles Jr. is a Jamaican politician and attorney.

Charles has been the Minister of Labour and Social Security since May 22, 2023. He was Minister of Agriculture and Fisheries in January 2022. He was formerly Minister of Housing, Urban Renewal, Environment and Climate Change from September 2020 and has been the member of parliament for Clarendon South Eastern since March 2020.

He is co-chair of the NDC Partnership.

Charles Jr is a former Government Senator and Member of Cabinet where he served as Minister of Housing, Urban Renewal, Environment and Climate Change. Prior to this appointment, he served as Minister without Portfolio from March 25, 2019, in the Ministry of Economic Growth and Job Creation with responsibility for Water, Housing, and Infrastructure, preceded by his tenure as Minister of State in the Ministry of Foreign Affairs and Foreign Trade with responsibility for Diaspora Affairs and the National Council for Coastal Zone Management, among other areas.

Charles is also an executive member of the Jamaica National Commission for UNESCO and serves as the Chairman of the UNESCO Youth Advisory Committee (UNESCOJAYAC). He is the conceptualizer of the UNESCOJAYAC Ambassador programme which has brought several youth across the country together to embark on a number of initiatives to boost youth engagement and participation in national development while promoting the goals and objectives of UNESCO.

Additionally, Charles is the chairman of the National Council on Ocean and Coastal Zone Management (NCOCZM), a multi-sector, multi-stakeholder, high level advisory body to the cabinet on ocean and coastal zone affairs, and its committees. He has a keen interest in the promotion and implementation of the sustainable development goals and in, July 2018, he led Jamaica's delegation to the United Nations that successfully presented the country's voluntary national review on the implementation of the SDGs at the high level political forum of the UN Economic and Social Council.

As a government senator, Charles was on the senate Standing Orders Committee and Private Bills Committee.

Charles was previously appointed by Prime Minister Andrew Holness as a senator and as the Minister of State in Ministry of National Security on March 7, 2016. This was consequent to the 2016 Jamaican general election victory of Holness' Jamaica Labour Party when it defeated the People's National Party to gain control of the house of representatives.

During his tenure as the minister of state in Ministry of National Security, Charles had specific responsibility for the Department of Correctional Services, the Jamaica Combined Cadet Force and special projects within the national security portfolio. With a focus on youth development, he established the Learning by Doing Competition in 2016, promoting a student-centered approach to rehabilitation. In 2017, this initiative evolved into th We Transform Programme, a youth empowerment and reintegration programme operating across all juvenile institutions in the Department of Correctional Services.

== Early life ==
He is the son of Pearnel Charles and Gloria Charles. His siblings are Patrece Charles-Freeman and Michelle Charles.

From left: Charles, Prime Minister Holness, former Commissioner of Police, Dr. Williams and Digicel representative with children in the constituency, St. Andrew West Central

== Education ==
Charles attended Campion College in Kingston and went on to complete a Bachelor of Science degree (biochemistry and zoology) with honours at the University of the West Indies (UWI), Mona. He also completed a Bachelor of Laws with honours at UWI, Cave Hill. During his time at UWI, Cave Hill, he was elected president of the Guild of Students where he was the chief voice for students to the administration and as a member of the University Council. He was also the president of the Law Society as well as the representative for the Pure and Applied Science Faculty to the Guild of Students at the UWI, Mona campus.

Charles also completed a Certificate of Legal Education at the Norman Manley Law School in Jamaica, where he was an active student and received notable awards. He subsequently attended The George Washington University Law School in Washington, DC. where he attained a Master of Laws and was awarded the Thomas Buergenthal Scholarship for academic performance.

== Life and career ==
Charles began his legal career as a judicial clerk in The Supreme Court and The Court of Appeal in Jamaica. He went on to be a senior clerk of court in the parish of Saint Catherine, before moving to the Office of the Director of Public Prosecutions to serve as Crown Counsel. He is now the lead counsel and managing attorney at the Law Offices of Pearnel P. Charles Jr., P.A., which manages clients globally.

In his early political career in the Jamaica Labour Party, he was deputy spokesperson for national security adding his valuable experience to the political agenda.

=== Department of Correctional Services ===
The Department of Correctional Services (DCS) manages Jamaica's corrections system, contributing to national security by implementing rehabilitation and reintegration programmes in the institutions while maintaining the safe custody of offenders. This administration is led by the Commissioner of Corrections, Ina Hunter, who works closely with the Permanent Secretary, Dianne McIntosh, and Charles. Since his appointment, he has sought ways to improve the rehabilitation of offenders to prepare them for life after release.

One such way was highlighted during Correctional Services Week 2016 (October 24–29), where Charles stated that offenders would be trained in farming techniques before they were released. He toured the nation's correctional facilities in early April to examine the deficiencies and initiate the fast-tracking of modernization in the facilities. Other steps have been taken to transform the prison system from a place of punishment to a place of rehabilitation from partnerships with the department, the ministry, private sectors and international bodies. Attempts have been made to make inmates functionally literate and in possession of at least one Heart Trust/NTA certified skill before release.

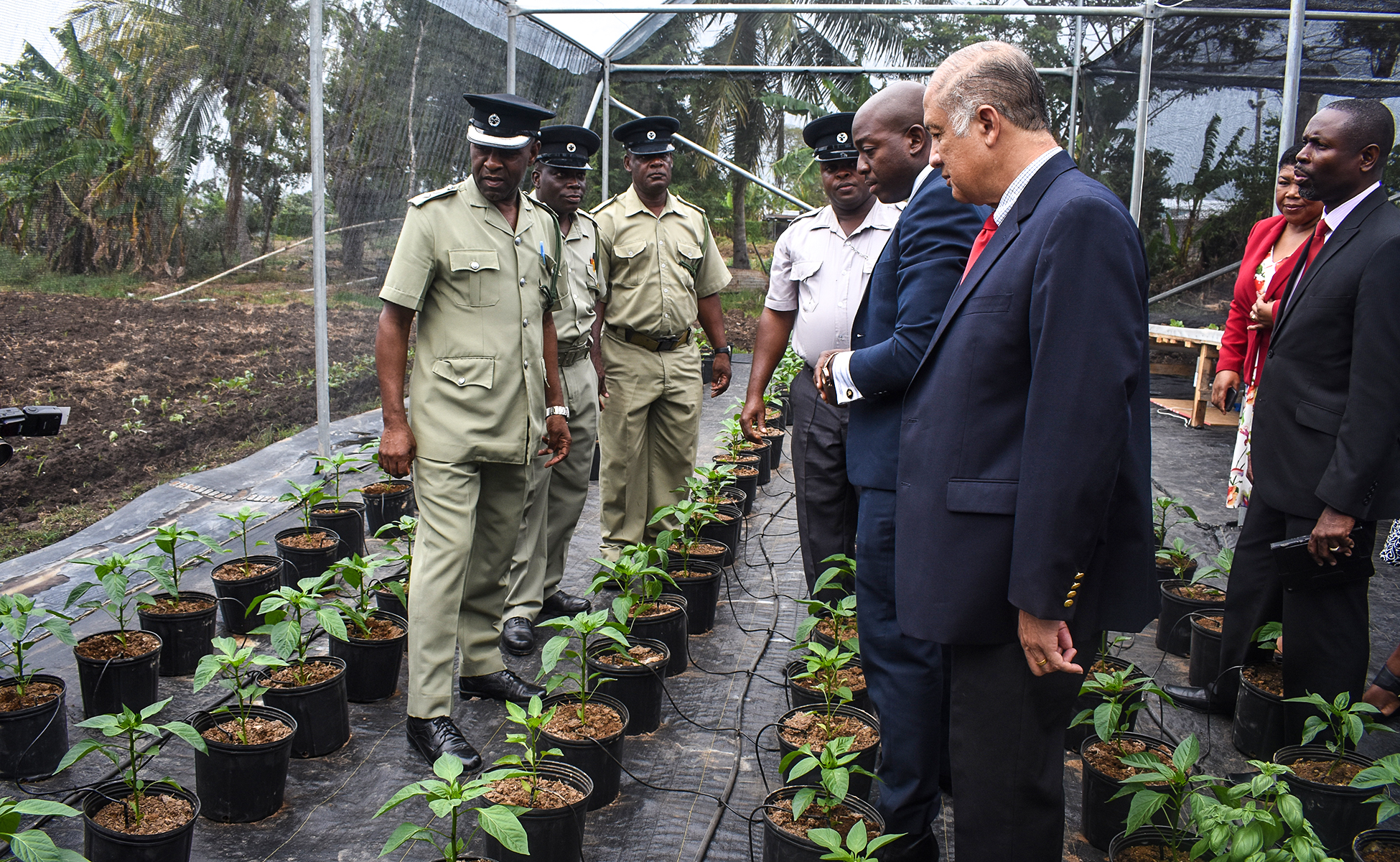
Charles (5th from right), Parris Lyew Aye CEO of Caribbean Cement Company Ltd, Jamaica (beside Charles), Joyce Stone (Deputy Commissioner of Corrections) look on as correctional officers (1st to 4th left) show crops that have been planted by the inmates of Greenhouse launch in Tamarind Farm Adult Correctional Centres

In order to further boost the rehabilitation process in the department, in March 2017 there was a handing over of a greenhouse project which saw twenty correctional officers, one agriculture instructor and ten inmates receiving practical teaching and training in order for a sustainable development. This is one of several measures taken by the department to reduce re-offending which is a focus of their five pillar crime-fighting strategy.

The Department of Correctional Services has joined efforts with international partners to advance the capabilities of the juveniles in their care. "A New Path: Promoting a Healthy Environment and Productive Alternatives for Juvenile Remandees and Offenders in Jamaica" is a project implemented by the general secretariat of the Organization of American States (GS/OAS), through its Department of Public Security (DPS), working with its affiliate, the Trust for the Americas, with the support of the United States Agency for International Development. The "New Path" project is in its second phase and has so far imnvolved 950 youth and provided educational and vocational training to 385 boys and girls. The "New Path" project is partnering with the DCS to reduce recidivism and, ultimately, crime and violence in Jamaica by improving the quality of and access to rehabilitation services for juvenile remandees at South Camp and Metcalfe Street Correctional facilities. In October 2017, 40 wards were chosen to pitch ideas to a group of judges on business ventures they are seeking to expand and receive monetary support. Of the 40, 21 were selected to receive $500,000 grants to jump start their careers. This initiative is in its second cycle and will provide five days of business training and local administrative support to former wards to ensure the success of their endeavors.

=== We Transform Programme ===
The We Transform Youth Empowerment and Reintegration Programme is the ministry's youth transformation programme aiming to provide children (12-17 yrs) in the care and supervision of the Department of Correctional Services with skills, character and support to become productive citizens. The programme was established by Charles in 2016 and initially branded as the Learning by doing Competition, a student-centered approach to rehabilitation.

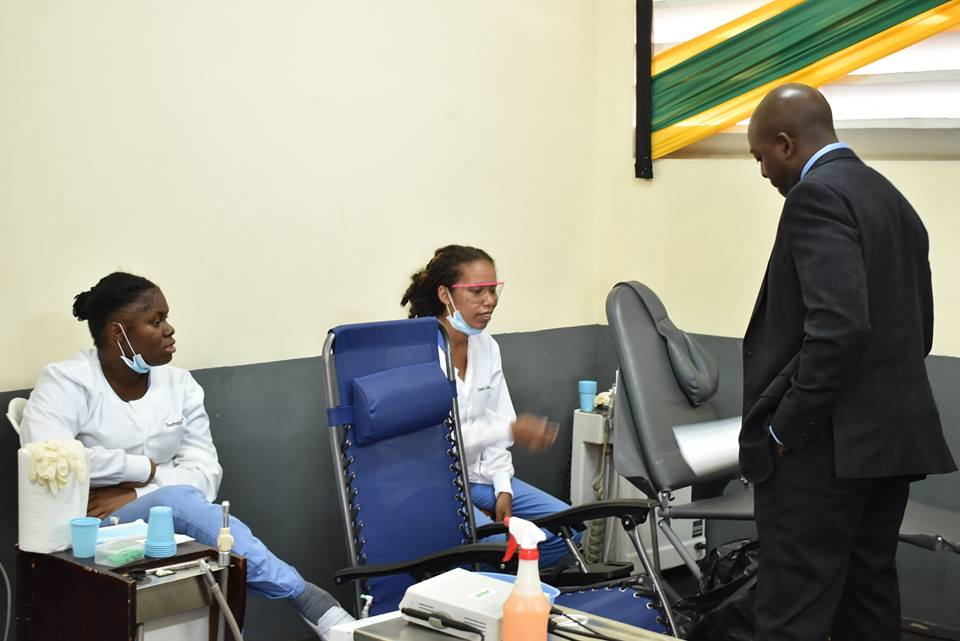
Charles (right) speaking with dental hygienists at the We Transform Health Fair in November 2017

=== Jamaica Combined Cadet Force ===
Charles with the Jamaica Combined Cadet Force

The Jamaica Combined Cadet Force (JCCF) is a voluntary youth organisation which has been in existence since 1943 and caters to children between ages of 11 to 17 years old. It is an essential arm of the Ministry of National Security which provides training to the nation's youth to develop strong and capable leaders. The JCCF falls within the responsibility of Charles, who has defined the JCCF as "one of the best vehicles to create a crime free Jamaica". He also highlighted the importance of the expansion of the cadet force as this is a part of social development pillar of the Ministry of National Security crime fighting strategy.

Charles, in his effort to advance the quality and quantity of resources in the cadet force, met with Audrey Marks, Jamaican ambassador to the US, to seek assistance in bolstering the capabilities of the JCCF. They discussed attractive avenues for recruiting youngsters to the force as well as how to actively engage them in crime fighting strategies.
