= Irtishad Ahmad =

American academic

Irishad Ahmad is professor and head of the Department of Civil Engineering at the American University of Sharjah in the United Arab Emirates. He was formerly professor and the Director of the Florida International University Moss School of Construction in Miami, Florida, and the former editor in chief of the Journal of Management in Engineering (ASCE).

He received the 2016 W.A. Klinger Construction Education Award from the American Institute of Constructors.

== Books ==
Tang, S.L. I. Ahmad, S.M. Ahmed and M. Lu, “Quantitative Techniques for Decision Making in Construction.” Hong Kong Polytechnic University Press. 2004.

== Edited Proceedings ==
- Ahmad, I., S.M. Ahmed, and S. Azhar, Proceedings of the First International Conference on Construction in the Twenty First Century, held in Miami, April, 2002.
- Ahmed, S.M., I. Ahmad, S.L. Tang, and S. Azhar, Proceedings of the Second International Conference on Construction in the Twenty First Century, held in Hong Kong, December, 2003.
