= Millicent A. Comrie =

Jamaican doctor

Millicent A. Comrie, born on August 6, 1948, and raised in Kingston, Jamaica, is a medical doctor specializing in obstetrics and gynecology. Over the time of her career, she has worked in Red Hook (Brooklyn, New York) and Jamaica. She is fluent in English and Spanish, and has working knowledge of German.

== Education ==
Comrie migrated to the US to attend Morgan University of Baltimore, Maryland, and Howard University in Washington, D.C. She attended State University of New York Downstate Health Science Center in Brooklyn, New York, where she earned her medical degree in 1976. Comrie later attended Columbia University Mailman School of Public Health where she received a Masters in Public Health with a focus on Maternal and Child Health.

== Career ==
Comrie currently works at Maimonides Medical Center in Brooklyn, New York, where she specializes in obstetrics and gynecology, focusing specifically on fibroids and abdominal myomectomies. She developed techniques that allowed women to keep their uterus and not require a hysterectomy. Comrie is the Medical Director and founder of Maimonides Brooklyn Heights Center for Women's Health. She established the Fibroid Center at Maimonides which is the only facility in Brooklyn that integrates gynecological, surgical, and radiological treatment. Comrie is also a member of the Organization for International Development and the Caribbean-American Outreach Association and the director of Myrtle Ferguson Girls Rescue Center in Kingston, Jamaica. She appeared as a guest speaker on BRIC TV in 2013 to discuss Bi-racial/Multi-racial Health. In the interview she discussed the importance of providing medical practitioners with personal ethnic information or background to provide information on any tests that should be conducted. Comrie serves on the Red Hook Initiative (RHI) Board of Directors for 17 years (the entirety of its existence) and is the longest serving board member.

== Awards and honors ==
"The Dr. Millicent Comrie Fund" was created in her honor which ensures reproductive health education and care in Red Hook, Brooklyn. From 2002 to 2014 she received the Top Doctors awards for the New York Metro Area. Comrie is recognized as one of the Top 10 Caribbean-Born Female Doctors in the U.S by News America. She won the Master Teacher Award in Obstetrics and Gynecology by the SUNY Downstate Alumni Association. In 2013, Comrie was awarded the Marcus Garvey Award for Community Service. In 2016, Comrie was conferred with the Order of Distinction (Officer's Class) from the Government of Jamaica. That same year, she received the Leader in Medicine Award by the Society of Foreign Consuls, an international organization representing the world's largest consular corps in New York. In 2021, Comrie was named by Carnegie Corporation of New York as an honoree of the Great Immigrants Award.

== Personal life ==
Comrie's brother, Fenton Ferguson, was Minister of Health for Jamaica. Dr. Comrie is married to Mr. Frederick Comrie and she has two daughters. Upon the death of one of her daughters in 2015, Comrie continued working at Maimonides Women's Center. Her surviving daughter, Sacha Comrie Jackson-Chin, is a practicing attorney in her own law firm, in Freeport, Long Island.
