= Yvonne Shaw =

Jamaican politician

MP for Saint Thomas Eastern
- Incumbent
- Assumed office 3 September 2025
- Preceded by: Michelle Charles

Personal details
- Born: March 23, 1960 (age 66)
- Party: People's National Party
- Education: University of the West Indies, Mona

Yvonne Rose-Marie Shaw (born March 23, 1960) is a Jamaican politician from the People's National Party who has been MP for Saint Thomas Eastern since 2025.

Shaw is the former Mayor of Morant Bay.
