= Ferrocement =

System of reinforced mortar or plaster

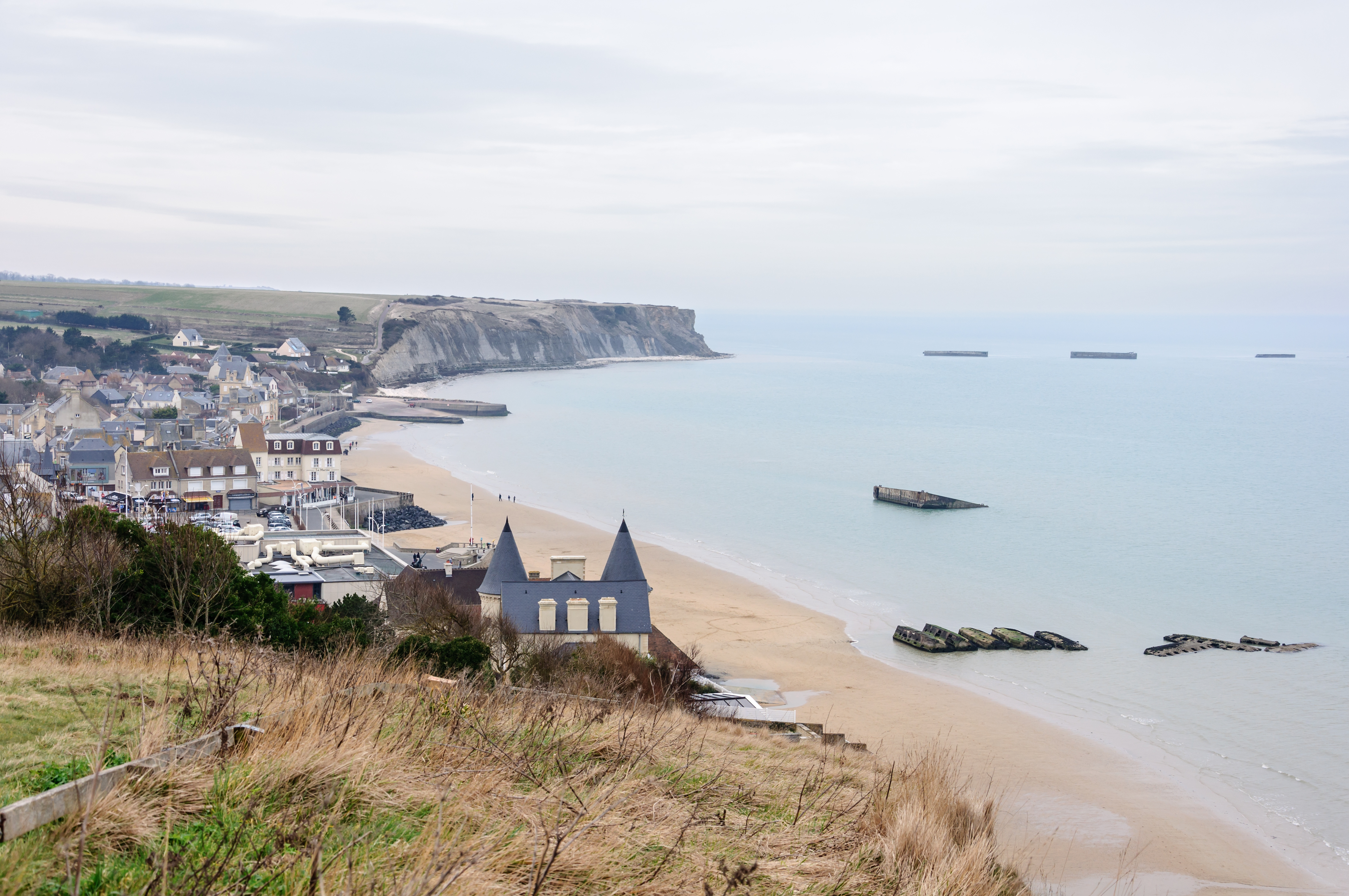
Mulberry harbour remains at Arromanches. The WWII harbor used ferrocement.

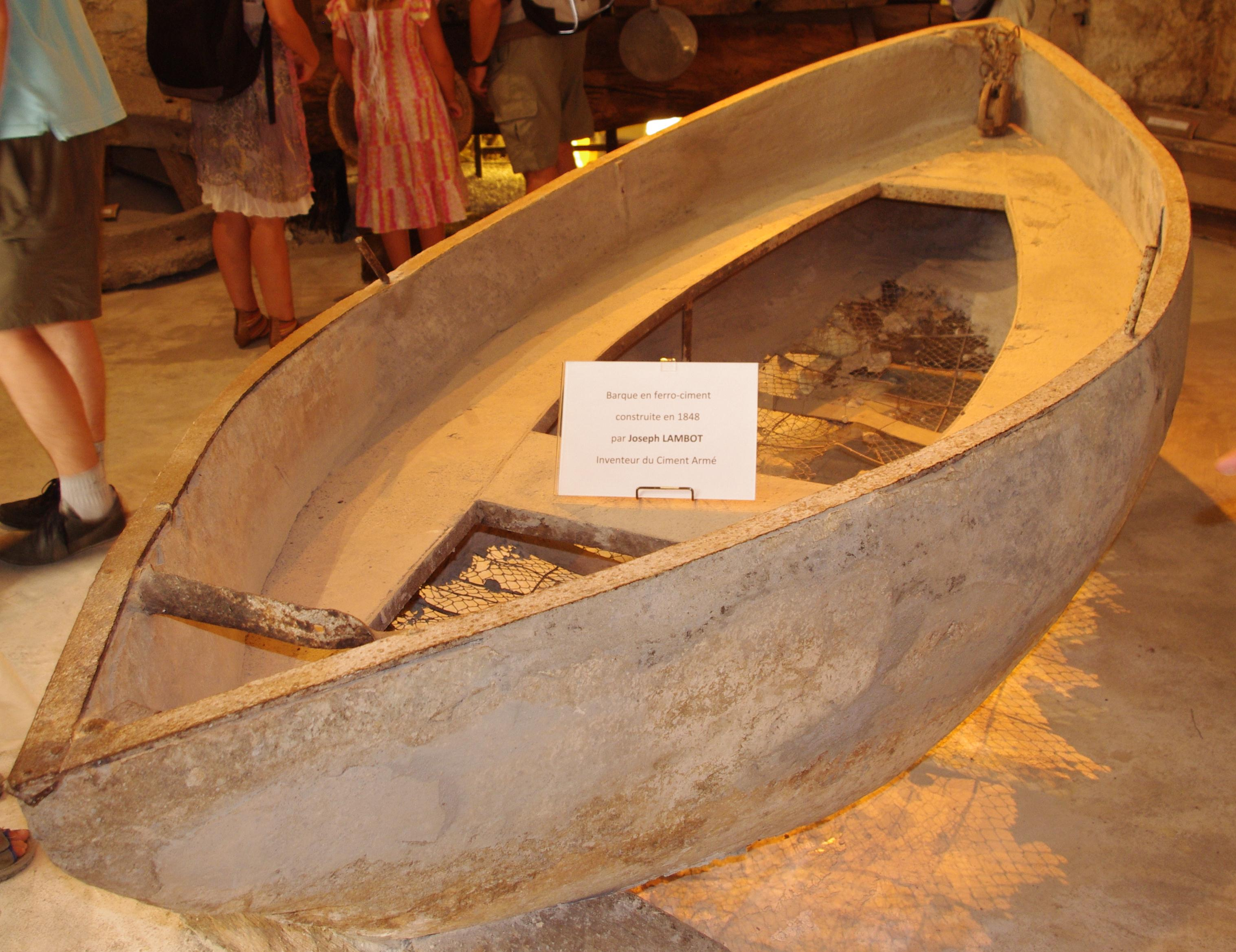
Lambot's original 1848 bateau in the Brignoles Museum in France.

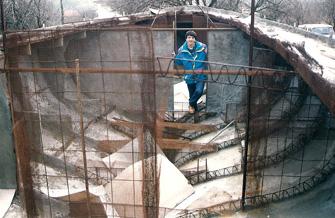
Ferrocement hull under construction

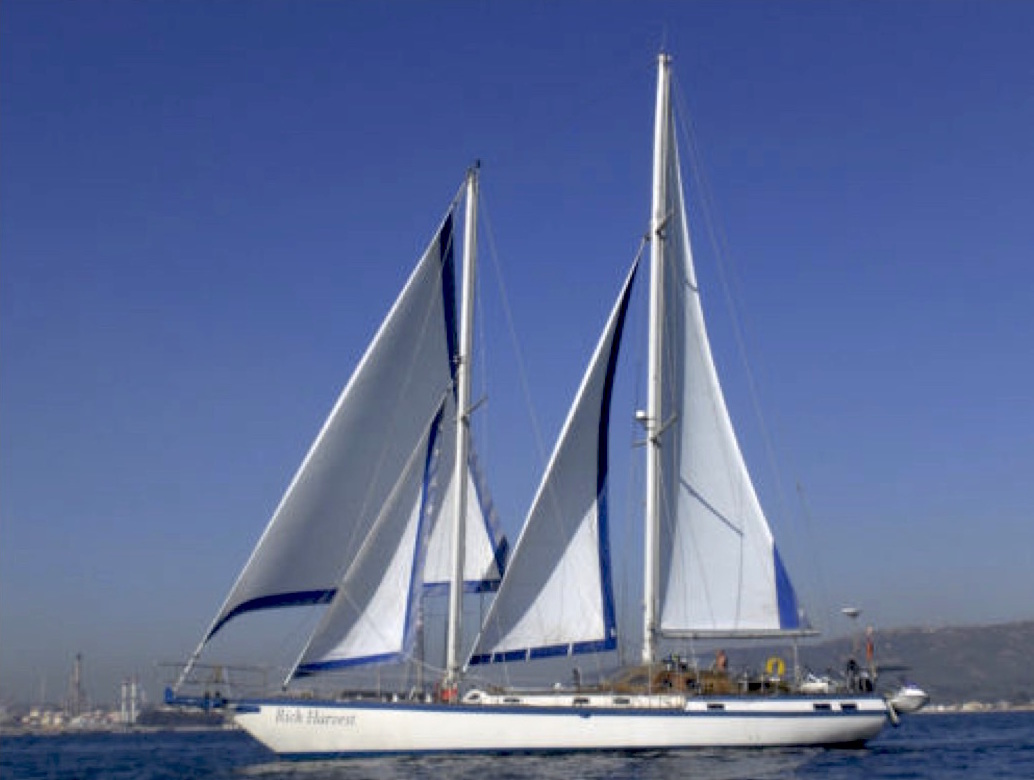
A particularly fair ferrocement vessel, the staysail schooner "Rich Harvest"

Ferrocement or ferro-cement is a system of construction using reinforced mortar or plaster (lime or cement, sand, and water) applied over an "armature" of metal mesh, woven, expanded metal, or metal-fibers, and closely spaced thin steel rods such as rebar. The metal commonly used is iron or some type of steel, and the mesh is made with wire with a diameter between 0.5 mm and 1 mm. The cement is typically a very rich mix of sand and cement in a 3:1 ratio; when used for making boards, no gravel is used, so that the material is not concrete.

Ferrocement is used to construct relatively thin, hard, strong surfaces and structures in many shapes such as hulls for boats, shell roofs, and water tanks. Ferrocement originated in the 1840s in France and the Netherlands and is the precursor to reinforced concrete. It has a wide range of other uses, including sculpture and prefabricated building components. The term "ferrocement" has been applied by extension to other composite materials, including some containing no cement and no ferrous material.

The "Mulberry harbours" used in the D-Day landings were made of ferrocement, and their remains may still be seen at resorts like Arromanches.

== Definitions ==
Cement and concrete are often used interchangeably but there are technical distinctions and the meaning of cement has changed since the mid-nineteenth century when ferrocement originated. Ferro- means iron although metal commonly used in ferro-cement is the iron alloy steel. Cement in the nineteenth century and earlier meant mortar or broken stone or tile mixed with lime and water to form a strong mortar. Today cement usually means Portland cement, Mortar is a paste of a binder (usually Portland cement), sand and water; and concrete is a fluid mixture of Portland cement, sand, water and crushed stone aggregate which is poured into formwork (shuttering). Ferro-concrete is the original name of reinforced concrete (armored concrete) known at least since the 1890s and in 1903 it was well described in London's Society of Engineer's Journal but is now widely confused with ferrocement.

== History ==
Ferrocement was independently developed by two French inventors: Joseph-Louis Lambot and Joseph Monier. In 1848, Lambot constructed a boat using a cement and iron mesh system, which he later exhibited at the Exposition Universelle in 1855 under the name ferciment. Although he patented the method in Belgium the same year, the patent applied only within that country.

Joseph Monier, initially a gardener, patented his version of reinforced cement in July 1867 for manufacturing urns, planters, and cisterns—traditionally made of fragile and costly ceramics. In 1875, he expanded his patent to include structural applications such as bridges, creating one of the first steel-reinforced concrete bridges. The structure's exterior was styled to resemble rustic timber, an early example of faux bois (fake wood) concrete.

In the first half of the 20th century, Italian engineer Pier Luigi Nervi advanced the use of ferrocement (Italian: ferro-cemento) in architectural and structural design.

Ferroconcrete has relatively good strength and resistance to impact. When used in house construction in developing countries, it can provide better resistance to fire, earthquake, and corrosion than traditional materials, such as wood, adobe and stone masonry. It has been popular in developed countries for yacht building because the technique can be learned relatively quickly, allowing people to cut costs by supplying their own labor. In the 1930s through 1950s, it became popular in the United States as a construction and sculpting method for novelty architecture, examples of which are the Cabazon Dinosaurs and the works of Albert Vrana.

== Construction formwork ==
The desired shape may be built from a multi-layered construction of mesh, supported by an armature, or grid, built with rebar and tied with wire. For optimum performance, steel should be rust-treated, (galvanized) or stainless steel. Over this finished framework, an appropriate mixture (grout or mortar) of Portland cement, sand and water and/or admixtures is applied to penetrate the mesh. During hardening, the assembly may be kept moist, to ensure that the concrete is able to set and harden slowly and to avoid developing cracks that can weaken the system. Steps should be taken to avoid trapped air in the internal structure during the wet stage of construction as this can also create cracks that will form as it dries. Trapped air will leave voids that allow water to collect and degrade (rust) the steel. Modern practice often includes spraying the mixture at pressure (a technique called shotcrete) or some other method of driving out trapped air.

Older structures that have failed offer clues to better practices. In addition to eliminating air where it contacts steel, modern concrete additives may include acrylic liquid "admixtures" to slow moisture absorption and increase shock resistance to the hardened product or to alter curing rates. These technologies, borrowed from the commercial tile installation trade, have greatly aided in the restoration of these structures. Chopped glass or poly fiber can be added to reduce crack development in the outer skin. (Chopped fiber could inhibit good penetration of the grout to steel mesh constructions. This should be taken into consideration and mitigated, or limited to use on outer subsequent layers. Chopped fibers may also alter or limit some wet sculpting techniques.)

== Economics ==
The economic advantage of ferro concrete structures is that they are stronger and more durable than some traditional building methods. Ferro concrete structures can be built quickly, which can have economic advantages.

In India, ferro concrete is used often because the constructions made from it are more resistant to earthquakes. Earthquake resistance is dependent on good construction technique.

In the 1970s, designers adapted their yacht designs to the then very popular backyard building scheme of building a boat using ferrocement. Its big attraction was that for minimum outlay and costs, a reasonable application of skill, an amateur could construct a smooth, strong and substantial yacht hull. A ferro-cement hull can prove to be of similar or lower weight than a fiber reinforced plastic (fiberglass), aluminium, or steel hull.

There are basically three types of methods of ferrocement. They are following

1. Armature system: In this method the skeleton steel is welded to the desired shape on either of sides of which are tied several layers of stretched meshes. This is strong enough, so that mortar can be filled in by pressing for one side and temporarily supporting from the other side. Filling in of mortar can also be administered by pressing in the mortar from both the sides. In this method the skeletal steel (bars) are at centre of the section and as such they add to the dead weight of without any contribution to strength.
2. Closed mould systems: Several layers of meshes are tied together against the surface of the mould which holds them in position while mortar is being filled in. The mould may be removed after curing or may remain in position as a permanent part of a finished structure. If the mould is to be removed for reuse, releasing agent must be used.
3. Integrated mould system: Using minimum reinforcement any integral mould is first to be considered to act as a framework. On this mould layers of meshes are fixed on either side and plastering is done onto them from both sides. As the name suggests, the mould remains permanently as an integral part of the finished structure. (e.g. double T-sections for flooring, roofing, etc.) Precaution should be taken to have firm connection between the mould and the layers filled in later, so that finished product as a whole integral structural unit.

== Advantages ==
The advantages of a well built ferro concrete construction are the low weight, maintenance costs, and long lifetime in comparison with purely steel constructions. However, meticulous building precision is considered crucial, especially with respect to the cementitious composition and the way in which it is applied in and on the framework, and how or if the framework has been treated to resist corrosion.

When a ferro concrete sheet is mechanically overloaded, it will tend to fold instead of break or crumble like stone or pottery. As a container, it may fail and leak but possibly hold together. Much depends on the techniques used in the construction.

Using the example of the Mulberry Harbours, pre-fabricated units could be made for ports (such as Jamestown on St Helena) where conventional civil engineering is difficult.

== Disadvantages ==
The disadvantage of ferro concrete construction is the labor-intensive nature of it, which makes it expensive for industrial application in the western world. In addition, threats to degradation (rust) of the steel components is a possibility if air voids are left in the original construction, due to too dry a mixture of the concrete being applied, or not forcing the air out of the structure while it is in its wet stage of construction, through vibration, pressurized spraying techniques, or other means. These air voids can turn to pools of water as the cured material absorbs moisture. If the voids occur where there is untreated steel, the steel will rust and expand, causing the system to fail.

In modern practice, the advent of liquid acrylic additives and other advances to the grout mixture create slower moisture absorption over the older formulas, and also increase bonding strength to mitigate these failures. Restoration steps should include treatment to the steel to arrest rust, using practices for treating old steel common in auto body repair.

=== Insurance issues ===
In the 1960s in Australia, New Zealand, and the UK, amateur boatbuilders turned to ferrocement to build larger hulls on limited budgets. However, many underestimated the high fitting-out costs of larger vessels. As a result, some projects remained unfinished or were poorly completed—often overweight and crudely built. In some cases, owners insured their unsellable boats and deliberately sank them to claim compensation. Due to such frauds, insurers became cautious, and today even well-built ferrocement boats face difficulties obtaining third-party coverage, while comprehensive insurance is rarely available.

== See also ==
- Types of concrete
- François Hennébique
- Faux Bois
- Concrete ship
- Big Duck
