= Saint Thomas Eastern =

Parliamentary constituency in Jamaica

Saint Thomas Eastern is number 48; the constituency furthest east.

Saint Thomas Eastern is a parliamentary constituency represented in the House of Representatives of the Jamaican Parliament. It covers the eastern part of Saint Thomas Parish.

Fenton Ferguson was the MP but lost his seat in the 2020 general election to Michelle Charles.

== Representatives ==
- Pearnel Charles (1972 to 1980)
- Pearnel Charles (defeated by Ferguson in 1993)
- Fenton Ferguson (1993 to 2020)
- Michelle Charles (2020 to 2025)
- Yvonne Shaw (from 2025)
