= Northern Caribbean University =

University in Jamaica

Coordinates: 18.016°N 77.499°W

- Motto: Latin: Ubi Semper Discimus
- Motto in English: "Where learning never ends"
- Type: Private
- Established: 1907; 119 years ago
- President: Balvin B. Braham, Ed.D.
- Faculty: 941
- Students: 5,993
- Location: Mandeville, Kingston, Montego Bay, Runaway Bay
- Campus: 200 acres (0.81 km^{2})
- Colours: Blue & Yellow
- Website: www.ncu.edu.jm

Northern Caribbean University (NCU) is a university in Mandeville, Manchester, Jamaica.

NCU, founded in 1907, is owned and operated by the Seventh-day Adventist Church, and also has campuses in Kingston, Montego Bay, and Runaway Bay. The university offers a number of professional, pre-professional and vocational programmes.

It is a part of the Seventh-day Adventist education system, the world's second largest Christian school system.

== History ==
Northern Caribbean University is the oldest private tertiary institution in Jamaica, and was first known as West Indian Training School. The school began with 8 students in 1907, as an institution offering courses only up to the twelfth grade. Following a temporary closure in 1913, it resumed operations in 1919. In 1936 the institution was renamed West Indian Training College. As its offerings developed to include theology, teacher education, secretarial science, business, and natural sciences, it became a junior college. The then institution achieved senior college status in the late 1950s, when it began to offer the bachelor's degree in Theology and was renamed West Indies College in 1959. Since then, baccalaureate programmes in several disciplines have been added. In 1999 the college was granted university status by the Jamaican Government, and was renamed Northern Caribbean University. Currently, the university offers over 70 graduate and post-graduate programs in the sciences, humanities, religion, business and education.

== Hyacinth Chen Nursing School ==
The Hyacinth Chen School of Nursing was officially opened on the 10th of August 2008 on a location directly across from the Northern Caribbean University campus across from NCU's Dental Centre located in Mandeville, Jamaica.

The school is owned by the Seventh-day Adventist Church in Jamaica. The school is named in honour of Mrs. Hyacinth Chen, the mother of major donor, Michael Lee-Chin, Jamaican/Canadian businessman.

== Awards ==
The university gained global exposure in the Microsoft Imagine Cup competition of 2007 where members of the school's Computer and Information Sciences department competing as Team ICAD took 3rd place.

NCU was crowned regional champions in 2005, 2007, and 2009. In 2007, NCU Imagine Cup Team ICAD represented Jamaica and the region at the world finals in South Korea where it outclassed competitors from across the globe to place 3rd in the world.

== Research ==
The university hosts a local research centre of the Ellen G. White Estate.

== Historic buildings ==
Several buildings on the NCU site have been declared as National Historic Sites by the Jamaica National Heritage Trust, including Rose Cottage and the school's chapel.

== Notable alumni ==
- Stennett H. Brooks, president of the Northeastern Conference of Seventh-Day Adventist Churches
- Patrece Charles-Freeman, Jamaican public health expert
- Robert Miller, Jamaican member of parliament

== See also ==
- List of Seventh-day Adventist colleges and universities
- Seventh-day Adventist education
