= Lynne Barrett =

American writer and editor

Lynne Barrett is an American writer and editor, best known for her short stories.

== Background ==
Born and raised in New Jersey, she received a B.A. in English Composition from Mount Holyoke College and her M.F.A. from the University of North Carolina at Greensboro.

== Career ==
Her story, “Elvis Lives”, was awarded the 1991 Edgar Allan Poe Award of the Mystery Writers of America for Best Mystery Short Story and has been widely anthologized. “Beauty” won the Best Short Story Award at the Moondance International Film Festival in 2001. She has received an NEA (1991), and an artist's fellowship from the Florida Division of Cultural Affairs (2001–02). Her short stories have appeared in Redbook, twice in Ellery Queen's Mystery Magazine, Mondo Barbie (St. Martin's), Literature: Reading and Responding to Fiction, Poetry, Drama and the Essay (HarperCollins), Simply the Best Mysteries (Carroll & Graf), Irrepressible Appetites (Rock Press), Marilyn: Shades of Blonde (Forge) and many other magazines and anthologies. Recent stories have appeared in A Dixie Christmas (Algonquin Books, 2005), Miami Noir (Akashic Books, 2006), One Year to a Writing Life (Marlowe & Company, 2007), Delta Blues (Tyrus Books, 2010), Fort Lauderdale Magazine (2014), Trouble in the Heartland: Crime Stories Inspired by the Songs of Bruce Springsteen (Gutter Books, 2014), Fifteen Views of Miami (Burrow Press, 2014) and the Southern Women's Review (2015)

She wrote the libretto for the children's opera Cricketina. She has co-edited a collection of James M. Cain's nonfiction and Birth: A Literary Companion, an anthology of poetry, fiction, and nonfiction about becoming a parent. She founded Gulf Stream Magazine and went on to edit it from 1989–2002.

Her essay "What Editors Want", published by The Review Review, earned coverage in the L.A. Times Book Blog "Jacket Copy" and the New Yorker's "The Book Bench" blog. It was republished in Glimmer Train's "Bulletin".

Barrett's third book Magpies won the 2011 Florida Book Award Gold Medal for general fiction.

Barrett is founder and editor of The Florida Book Review and Professor of English at Florida International University where she teaches in the M.F.A. program in Creative Writing.

== Works ==
- The Land of Go (short stories) (Carnegie Mellon University Press, 1988)
- The Secret Names of Women (short stories) (Carnegie Mellon, 1999), a BookSense selection of the American Booksellers Association
- Magpies (short stories) (Carnegie Mellon, 2011), winner of the 2011 Florida Book Award Gold Medal for General Fiction
- Cricketina (opera libretto), with music composed by Dr. Kristine Burns, debuted at the FIU Music Festival, Nov. 15, 2003, Miami, FL
- The James M. Cain Cookbook, Guide to Home Singing, Physical Fitness and Animals (Especially Cats) (Carnegie Mellon 1988) ed. by Roy Hoopes and Lynne Barrett
- Birth: A Literary Companion (University of Iowa Press, 2002) ed by Kristin Kovacic and Lynne Barrett
