= Henry Westmoreland =

American soccer player

Personal information
- Full name: Henry Westmoreland III
- Date of birth: July 16, 1958 (age 68)
- Place of birth: Miami, Florida, United States
- Position: Goalkeeper

Youth career
- 1979–1980: FIU Golden Panthers

Senior career*
Years	Team	Apps	(Gls)
1980–1982	Phoenix Inferno (indoor)	26	(0)
- * Club domestic league appearances and goals

Henry Westmoreland is a retired American soccer goalkeeper who played professionally in the Major Indoor Soccer League.

Westmoreland attended Florida International University, playing on the men's soccer team in 1979 and 1980. In 1980, he turned professional with the Phoenix Inferno of the Major Indoor Soccer League. Despite not having ever seen an indoor soccer match prior to joining the Inferno, Westmoreland was named MISL Player of the Week less than a month after his signing. He spent two seasons with the Inferno. He later coached the Florida State University School Girls' & Boys' soccer team.
