= American Institute of Constructors =

- Abbreviation: AIC
- Founded at: Oklahoma
- Type: Professional association
- Legal status: 501(c)(6)
- Purpose: Advancement of professionalism and ethics in the Construction industry
- Region served: USA
- Fields: Construction, Construction Management, Engineering, Education
- Official language: English
- President: Brian Holley, CPC
- Vice President: Brad Monson, CPC
- Treasurer: Mark Hall, CPC
- Secretary: Scott Cuthbertson, CPC
- Board of directors: Dennis Bausman, Greg Carender, Mark D. Hall, Bradley Monson, Joseph A. Rietman, Terry Foster, Joe Burgett, Ihab Saad, James Hogan, Saeed Goodman, Jason Lucas, Scott Cuthbertson, Jim Nissen, Chris Clifford,
- Key people: Tanya Matthews, David Fleming, Andy Wasiniak, Mark Giorgi, Paul Mattingly, Joe Sapp
- Main organ: The American Professional Constructor
- Subsidiaries: Constructor Certification Commission
- Budget: $650,000
- Website: aic-builds.org

The American Institute of Constructors (AIC), is a not-for-profit 501(c)(6) non-governmental professional association founded in 1971. Individuals involved in the AIC are typically found in the construction management Industry.

The AIC offers three different levels of certification: Associate Constructor (AC), Certified Professional Constructor (CPC), and Fellow (FC). American Institute of Constructors also offers a number of educational programs, including online courses, webinars, and in-person seminars.
