= Gregory Baker Wolfe =

American diplomat

Gregory Baker Wolfe (January 27, 1922 – December 12, 2015) was an American diplomat during the Kennedy and Johnson administrations, and later president of two urban institutions of higher education, Portland State University in Portland, Oregon, and Florida International University (FIU) in Miami, Florida.

== Early life, education, and military service ==
Born in Los Angeles to a Russian immigrant father and a mother of Irish descent., Wolfe received an undergraduate degree from Reed College in Portland, and a doctorate from the Fletcher School of Law and Diplomacy in Massachusetts. Wolfe served in World War II, and was thereafter an intelligence analyst for the U.S. State Department.

== Academic career ==
In 1968, Wolfe was named president of Portland State University, which position he held until 1974, when he ran for Congress in the Democratic primary in Portland. He finished third out of seven candidates, and then moved to teach at American University.

Wolfe was appointed president of Florida International University in 1979, over the objection of some state legislators who preferred a local candidate for the position. He served until his resignation in 1986, during which time he oversaw significant growth as the university progressed from being an exclusively upper-division school (having no freshman or sophomores) to becoming a four-year college granting post-graduate degrees. He also oversaw the addition of the university's engineering, nursing, and journalism programs. The Florida State Legislature recognized Wolfe's contributions to the growth and emergence of FIU by naming the Gregory Baker Wolfe University Center, located on FIU's Biscayne Bay Campus, in his honor.

== Personal life ==
Wolfe and his wife Mary Ann had three children, Gregory Nelson, Laura Ann and Melissa as well as three grandchildren. Wolfe died in Sunny Isles, Florida.

Preceded by Branford P. Millar	President of Portland State University; 1968 to 1974	Succeeded by Joseph C. Blumel
Preceded by Harold Crosby	President of Florida International University; 1979 - 1986	Succeeded by Modesto Maidique
