= Harold B. Crosby =

American university founder and president

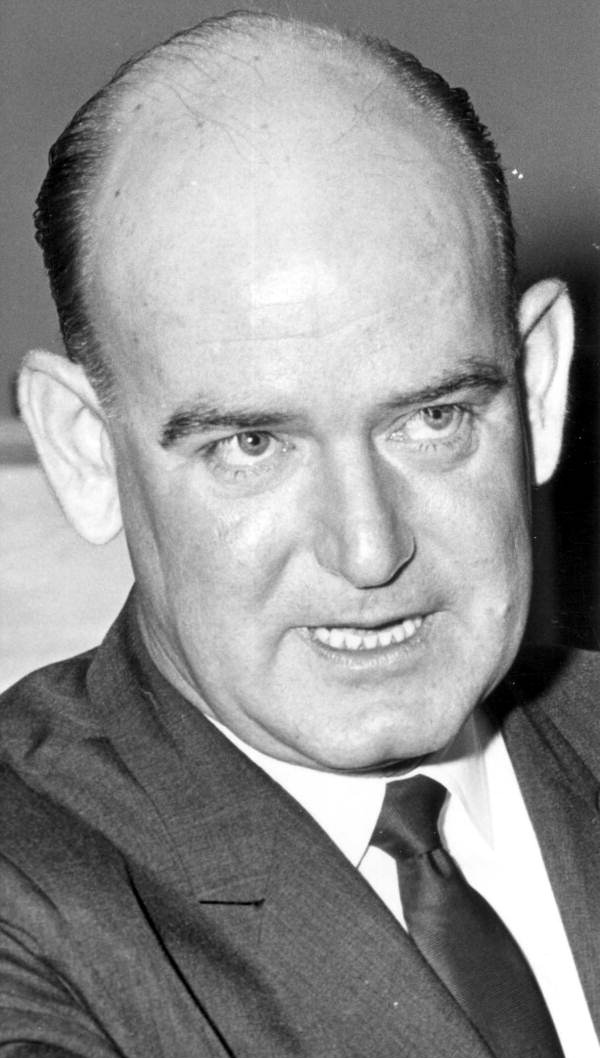

2nd President of Florida International University
- In office 1976–1979
- Preceded by: Chuck Perry
- Succeeded by: Gregory Baker Wolfe

Personal details
- Born: September 21, 1918 Jacksonville, Florida
- Died: January 10, 1996 (aged 77) Pensacola, Florida
- Education: University of Florida (JD); Northwestern University (BA)
- Known for: Being the President of FIU; Founder of UWF

Harold B. Crosby (September 21, 1918 – January 10, 1996) was the founding president of the University of West Florida and the second president of Florida International University. He received his Bachelor of Arts from Northwestern University, and his law degree from the University of Florida. He married Margaret Dutton Crosby, and they had two children: Susan Crosby Cross and Anne Bryan Crosby Higgins. He was remarried with Constance Westbury.

Soldier, lawyer, educator, judge, professor, dean, college president – Harold Crosby made his mark in many fields. He was the founding Editor-in-Chief of the College of Law’s Florida Law Review, honored by his alma mater and the state for his contributions to education, professor and assistant dean at UFLaw, UF Dean of University Relations and Development, and president of two state universities – University of West Florida (Pensacola) for 10 years, and interim and permanent president of Florida International University (Miami) for five. His efforts on behalf of the state’s legal system – serving as consultant to the Florida Constitutional Advisory Commission in the mid-50s and as Commissioner for the Promotion of Uniform State Laws in the mid-60s – also were noteworthy.

Preceded by NA	President of University of West Florida; 1964–1974	Succeeded by James A. Robinson
Preceded by Chuck Perry	President of Florida International University; 1976–1979	Succeeded by Gregory Baker Wolfe
