= Society for Crypto-Judaic Studies =

American nonprofit organization

- Abbreviation: SCJS
- Formation: 1991
- Founder: Rabbi Joshua Stampfer, Dr. Stanley Hordes, Rena Down
- Type: Non-profit
- Legal status: Active
- Purpose: Research on crypto-Judaism
- Headquarters: Aurora, Colorado, United States
- Website: www.cryptojews.com

The Society for Crypto-Judaic Studies (SCJS) is an American nonprofit organization that promotes historical research and contemporary scholarship on Sephardic crypto-Jews and their descendants. It focuses on members of the Jewish diaspora originating in Spain and Portugal who fled to the New World during the Inquisition. The society was founded in 1991 by three people in response to growing interest in Jewish ancestry in New Mexico and the broader Southwestern United States. The SCJS hosts an annual conference, publishes a biannual journal, and produces several newsletters.

== History ==
The SCJS was founded in 1991 by Rabbi Joshua Stampfer, Dr. Stanley Hordes, and playwright Rena Down. The organization was established in response to growing interest in Jewish ancestral ties in New Mexico and the broader southwestern United States, a region with historical connections to Sephardic Jews dating back to early colonization. The first SCJS meeting was held that year at Fort Burgwin, near Taos, New Mexico. In 1993, Sephardic Jewish historian Arthur Benveniste of Los Angeles, California, joined the SCJS. The following year, the society held its annual conference in two towns in Portugal, marking the first time it convened outside the United States. In 1995, it launched its first website. (Note: The SCJS website was hosted on a platform known as The Sephardi Connection, a virtual project serving Sephardic Jewish communities that is now discontinued.)

The SCJS grew rapidly in its early years, with many members discovering the organization through online searches. By the late 1990s, several other Sephardic Jewish organizations had emerged in the southwestern and western United States. During this period, the SCJS was also among the first organizations to promote the term "crypto-Jew", which refers to the secret practice of Judaism while outwardly professing another faith. In a 1997 interview, Benveniste explained that several SCJS members who discovered their Jewish heritage returned to Judaism, while others continued to profess the Christian faith but sought to maintain connections to their Jewish roots. Interest in the Jewish central roots in New Mexico led to the launch of a radio program covering crypto-Jewish topics in 1999, and the SCJS held a conference in Los Angeles attended by more than 50 scholars from the United States and Latin America that year.

In 2001, SCJS members met in Flagstaff, Arizona, to draft the society's bylaws, recognizing the need for formal governance as membership expanded. The bylaws were later approved at a conference in Pueblo, Colorado. That same year, Benveniste was appointed president of the SCJS, serving until 2003. In 2002, steps were taken to register the SCJS as a nonprofit organization to obtain tax-exempt status and apply for foundation grants. Attorney Martin Sosin of Santa Monica, California, provided pro bono legal assistance during the process. The organization declined an offer to advertise a bank in its publications until its nonprofit registration was finalized. That same year, the SCJS announced the launch of its current website and began migrating research articles and other publications to the new platform. The SCJS is a nonprofit organization based in Aurora, Colorado, incorporated as a domestic nonprofit corporation in California and granted 501(c)(3) status by the Internal Revenue Service in October 2004.

In January 2013, the SCJS affiliated with the University of Colorado Colorado Springs (UCCS) to establish a scholarly research program. The initiative aimed to promote interdisciplinary collaboration among faculty, students, community members, researchers, and the broader Jewish community. It was described as the "first university-based program in the United States" dedicated to advancing research in Sephardic Crypto-Jewish studies and sought to develop a formal curriculum on the subject. UCCS had previously hosted an SCJS annual conference on its campus. The affiliation between the SCJS and UCCS concluded in December 2015. The SCJS also maintained an affiliation with Florida International University (FIU), which was a registered member of the organization. One of its sociology and Jewish studies professors, Abraham Lavender, was also a SCJS member and president.

In 2014, crypto-Jewish author and researcher Genie Milgrom became president of the SCJS, a position she held until 2016.

== Objectives ==
The organization's primary mission is to promote historical research and contemporary scholarship related to Sephardic crypto-Jews and their descendants, members of the Jewish diaspora originating in Spain and Portugal who fled Europe during the 14th and 15th centuries amid the Inquisition and are now dispersed globally.

Initially founded as a strictly academic research institution, the organization later expanded into a multidisciplinary body that includes non-academics from diverse cultural backgrounds and engages both religious and secular communities. Secular in nature, the SCJS serves as a major repository of resource materials related to Sephardic Jews who fled Europe for the New World during the Inquisition.

The organization hosts an annual conference that bring together academics and non-academics to discuss recent research and personal narratives related to crypto-Jewish studies. A large portion of attendees come from New Mexico and other states in the Southwestern United States. The conferences typically feature a keynote address, research presentations, personal accounts from individuals reconnecting with their crypto-Jewish heritage, and cultural programming. The Sosin-Stratton-Pettit Foundation, a nonprofit established by the SCJS's former attorney Martin Sosin, sponsors the society's annual conferences to support the promotion of Jewish art. Funds provided by the foundation have also been used to support scholarships and fellowships for students interested in crypto-Judaic studies, to enable descendants of crypto-Jews to attend the SCJS conference, and to compensate keynote speakers.

The SCJS has also examined DNA studies concerning crypto-Jews, other European Jewish groups, and the broader Jewish population.

== Publications ==
The SCJS publishes a biannual journal titled HaLapid ('The Torch'), which features research articles and essays on topics related to Sephardic Jews and crypto-Judaism. Its name was inspired by a newsletter of the same title published by Artur Carlos de Barros Basto, a Portuguese military officer who wrote extensively on Judaism. HaLapid was founded in 1992 by Bob Hattem and has remained in continuous publication since its inception. Following Hattem's tenure, Benveniste assumed the role of editor of the journal. HaLapid publishes a range of material, including academic research articles by scholars of Sephardic Jewish history, personal narratives, news, and articles on the history of Sephardic Jews and their communities.

The SCJS also publishes La Granada, a free online newsletter founded in 2013 and managed by Debbie Wohl Isard, which is issued several times per year to provide updates between issues of HaLapid. In addition, the SCJS co-sponsored the Journal of Spanish, Portuguese, and Italian Crypto-Jews (JOSPIC-J), published by FIU, which featured scholarly research on Jewish communities from Spain, Portugal, and Italy. Italian Jewish studies were included due to Italy's status under Spanish rule during the Inquisition.

== Bibliography ==
- Benaim, Annette (1999). The proceedings of the Tenth British Conference on Judeo-Spanish Studies: 29 June—1 July 1997. Queen Mary and Westfield College. ISBN 0904188523.
- Herz, Cary (2007). New Mexico's Crypto-Jews: image and memory. University of New Mexico Press. ISBN 9780826342898. OCLC 124075008.
- Kunin, Seth Daniel (2009). Juggling Identities: Identity and Authenticity Among the Crypto-Jews. Columbia University Press. ISBN 9780231512572. OCLC 1091532912.
- Kunin, Seth Daniel (2023). Reflections on A New Mexican Crypto-Jewish Song Book. Rowman & Littlefield. ISBN 9781666926583. OCLC 1378934911.
- Liebman Jacobs, Janet (2002). Hidden Heritage: The Legacy of the Crypto-Jews. University of California Press. ISBN 9780520936614. OCLC 51822234.
- Melammed, Renée Levine (2004). A Question of Identity: Iberian Conversos in Historical Perspective. Oxford University Press. ISBN 9780195170719. OCLC 1014527259.
- Schuster, Diane Tickton (2022). Portraits of Adult Jewish Learning: Making Meaning at Many Tables. Wipf and Stock. ISBN 9781666724240. OCLC 1334718910.
- Sloan, Dolores (2015). The Sephardic Jews of Spain and Portugal: Survival of an Imperiled Culture in the Fifteenth and Sixteenth Centuries. McFarland & Company. ISBN 9781476615554. OCLC 680432065.
