= Chuck Perry =

Founding president of Florida International University

Chuck E. Perry

1st President of Florida International University
- In office 1965–1976
- Succeeded by: Harold B. Crosby

Personal details
- Born: Charles Edward Perry; 1937 Logan County, West Virginia, U.S.
- Died: August 30, 1999 (aged 61–62) Rockwall, Texas, U.S.
- Resting place: Primera Casa (Charles E. Perry Building), FIU, University Park, Florida, U.S.
- Spouse: Betty Laird (m. 1960)
- Education: Bowling Green State University
- Known for: Being the inaugural president of FIU

Charles Edward "Chuck" Perry (1937–1999) was the founding president of Florida International University in Miami, appointed in 1965. Perry died on August 30, 1999, at his home in Rockwall, Texas.

He is buried on the campus of FIU at the southeast corner of the Charles E. Perry building. The Charles E. Perry building located on the FIU campus is named in his honor.

Chuck Perry graduated from Bowling Green State University in 1959, where he was a member of Sigma Nu and played as a place kicker on Doyt Perry's football teams. He stayed on in fund raising for the university and has a building named for him at Bowling Green.

Later, he managed Jack Nicklaus's investments. Prior to being appointed to Florida International, he ran The Weekly Reader which was distributed to many secondary schools.

Preceded by NA	President of Florida International University; 1965 - 1976	Succeeded by Harold Crosby
