= Kern Spencer =

Jamaican politician

Kern Omar Spencer, MP (born 21 June 1974 in St. Elizabeth, Jamaica) is a Jamaican politician. A member of the People's National Party, Mr. Spencer served as Member of Parliament (MP) for St. Elizabeth North Eastern from 2007 to 2011.

== Education ==
Spencer attended the all-boys Munro College in the St. Elizabeth, Jamaica. He later attended the University of the West Indies (UWI) (1993–2000) where he earned a BSc in management and an MSc in International Relations. In addition to his academic achievements, he was involved in student and government activities at the U.W.I., serving as President and Vice President of the Guild of Students.

== Political life ==
Kern Spencer is a former president of the People's National Party Youth Organization (PNPYO) and was General Secretary of the organisation from 2001 to 2002.

In March 2005 when he was selected unopposed as the PNP caretaker for the St Elizabeth North East constituency, Spencer was serving as parliamentary secretary in the Ministry of National Security.

On 3 September 2007, Spencer won the St Elizabeth North East seat by defeating the Jamaica Labour Party's Corris Samuels. The final count was 9,047 votes to 6,909.

== Cuban Light Bulb Scandal ==
While a state minister in the energy ministry in the previous government led by the PNP, Spencer was placed in charge of an energy-saving project. The project involved the distribution of four million free Cuban light bulbs islandwide. The project was implemented in July 2006. Allegations of irregularities in the project were leveled against Spencer in Parliament in November 2007 by then Energy Minister Clive Mullings, who asked the auditor-general and the contractor-general to probe the matter Clive Mullings, told Parliament that $114 million was improperly spent on the distribution of four million energy-saving light bulbs donated by the Cuban Government to the people of Jamaica.

== Crying in Parliament ==
Clive Mullings, during his parliamentary presentation on the Cuban light bulb project, questioned Spencer's role in the project as well as the authorizing of payments. Mullings also raised the issue of fraud.

Unable the handle the questioning, Spencer broke down and began to cry. His crying became more evident as members of the Jamaica Labor Party (JLP) began to shout at him for answers. JLP Member of Parliament Audley Shaw was clearly amused by the feeble nature of his political opponent and began laughing at Spencer.

Leader of the PNP opposition, Portia Simpson Miller, tried to console him. This seemed to bring on more tears from Spencer. The incident saw Spencer being labeled as a "cry baby". The cry baby image resulted in Spencer being the butt of numerous political jokes and caricatures in the national newspapers.

== Arrest ==
In January 2008, the auditor-general reported that about 176,380 of the four million bulbs, costing approximately $92 million, could not be accounted for. There was also an absence of an effective system of budgetary control resulting in the making of payments and the incurring of unpaid obligations of $185.3 million over the approved financial support. On 26 February 2008 Kern Spencer was arrested and slapped with seven charges. He is facing three charges of conspiracy to defraud, one charge for breaching the Prevention of Corruption Act, and three charges for breaching the Money Laundering Act.

Spencer spent the night in jail and remained behind bars until he was able to post bail on 29 February 2008.
