= Gulf Stream Magazine =

American literary magazine

- Editor: John Dufresne
- Frequency: Bi-annual
- Founded: 1989
- Company: Florida International University
- Country: United States
- Based in: Miami, Florida
- Language: American English
- Website: Gulf Stream Magazine

Gulf Stream Magazine is a bi-annual literary magazine published by the Creative Writing Program at Florida International University. The headquarters of the magazine is in Miami, Florida.

== History and profile ==
Gulf Stream Magazine was founded in 1989 by Lynne Barrett, who edited it until 2002 when John Dufresne became editor. The magazine is published biannually and carries fiction, poetry, creative non-fiction, interviews and reviews.

Among the major writers published in Gulf Stream are Ha Jin, James Carlos Blake, Sherman Alexie, Stuart Dybek, Peter Meinke, Maureen Seaton, Jacob M. Appel, Ann Hood, Ryan Shoemaker and Susan Neville.

== See also ==
- List of literary magazines
