= Stephan Charman =

American forensic and legal psychologist

Stephen Charman is a forensic and legal psychologist who is known for his research in eyewitness memory. Charman is an associate professor of psychology at Florida International University.

== Education ==
Charman received his Bachelors of Science degree in Psychology from Queens University. He attended graduate school at Iowa State University where he obtained a Master in Science and a PhD in Social Psychology. Charman's dissertation was titled Using counterfactuals to assess eyewitnesses' abilities to estimate the effects of external influences on their lineup identifications and discusses the limitations to eyewitness reliability in a legal context. Charman was mentored by Dr. Gary Wells, who he collaborated with on a number of articles and book chapters.

== Career ==
Charman began his career at Florida international University in 2006 as an assistant professor. He became an associate professor in psychology in 2012 and has since continued to teach and produce research as of 2024. Iowa State University hosted The Psychology and Law Colloquia Series where Charman spoke on Improving lineup identification outcomes by screening out witnesses in September 2019.

== Research ==
Charman's research has explored applied lineup theory and the external bias that can affect eyewitness memory and testimony. Charman's research was awarded by the American Psychological Association (2011–2014), National Institute of Justice (2021–2022; 2019–2023), and the National Science Foundation (2019–2025). He has been the co-principal investigator on a grant awarded by the Federal Bureau of Investigation. As of 2024, Charman has served as a peer reviewer for the following journals: Law and Human Behavior, Journal of Experimental Psychology, Applied Cognitive Psychology, Journal of Applied Research in Memory and Cognition, Current Directions in Psychological Science.
