= Abraham Lavender =

American sociologist

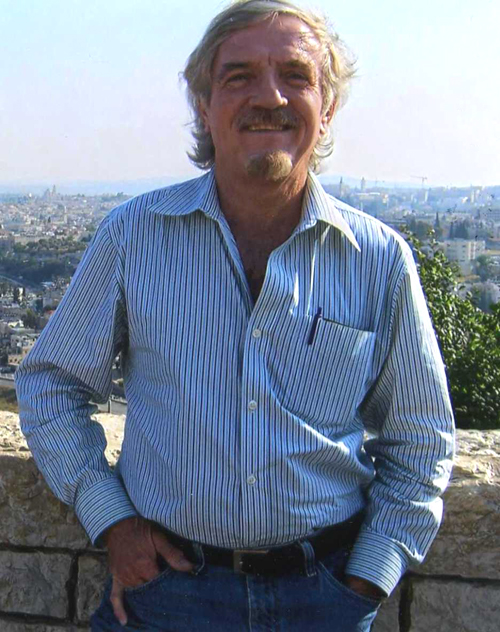
Lavender in Jerusalem, May 2006

Abraham Donald Lavender (November 14, 1940 – June 26, 2022) was a professor of sociology at Florida International University in Miami, Florida, where his special areas of interest include ethnic relations, Judaica, political sociology, urban sociology, the sociology of sexuality, and social deviance. He was editor-in-chief of Journal of Spanish, Portuguese, and Italian Crypto Jews, and had served as president of the Society for Crypto-Judaic Studies.

Having previously been a professor of sociology at St. Mary's College of Maryland and the University of Miami, he began teaching at Florida International University in 1990 and remained there until his death in 2022.

== Early life and education ==
Born in New Zion, South Carolina, Lavender's formal education started at Salem Elementary School in New Zion, and he graduated from East Clarendon High School in Turbeville, South Carolina. He received his B.A. and M.A. degrees in psychology from the University of South Carolina at Columbia, in 1963 and 1965 respectively. While at USC, he was a member of Phi Epsilon Pi (which later merged with Zeta Beta Tau) fraternity, and the AFROTC's Arnold Air Society, was president of the Hillel Foundation, and was elected to Phi Beta Kappa.

After completing military service, Lavender began his doctoral studies at the University of Maryland, College Park, with a doctoral dissertation on generational changes in Jewish identity. He received a Ph.D. in sociology in 1972.

== Career ==
Lavender served from 1964 to 1968 in the United States Air Force and completed his service as a captain, serving at Whiteman Air Force Base in Warrensburg, Missouri, where he was a Personnel Casualty Officer, and in Izmir, Turkey, as part of NATO (North Atlantic Treaty Organization).

Lavender wrote books and academic articles, mostly about ethnicity and Sephardic Jews, and other publications on sociology-related topics. Among his publications linking multiple areas of interest (Jews, Latins, ethnicity, political sociology) are A History of Jewish and Hispanic Interaction in Miami-Dade County (published by the American Jewish Committee) and Jews, Hispanics, Blacks, and Others in Miami Beach: An Ethnically Divided City or a Cosmopolitan Multiethnic City?, a monograph published by the Institute for Public Policy and Citizenship Studies at Florida International University to which the answer was Cosmopolitan Multiethnic City. In 1977, Lavender published a collection of studies on non-mainstream Jewish people in the United States, A Coat of Many Colors. As of 2014, he was completing a seventh book, Early Social Life in Miami Beach: From Mangroves and Mosquitoes to Mansions and Millionaires. He also was selected to write the article on Judaism for the Encyclopedia of Sociology, and to write seven articles on the relationship between anthropology and DNA for the Encyclopedia of Anthropology. Lavender argued that since Sephardic Jews constitute a separate group, they should be granted the same attention bestowed on other ethnic groups.

On six occasions, Lavender was honored (Distinguished Citizen Award, Key to the city, Certificate of Appreciation) for his civic activities in Miami Beach. Lavender also maintained close ties to Charleston, South Carolina, his second home, where he lived part-time, had many relatives and friends, visited frequently, had been a speaker at the historic (founded in the 1740s) Kahal Kadosh Beth Elohim Synagogue, conducted extensive research at the Huguenot Society, and was involved with the International Huguenot Conference held in Charleston in 1997.

=== Civic and political activities ===
Lavender also was active in civic and political affairs, serving as advisor to Miami Beach mayor Seymour Gelber, vice-chair and commissioner of the Miami Beach Housing Authority, chairperson of city's Homeless Committee, and as a member of the city's Safety Committee. He served on the board of directors of the Jewish Genealogical Society of Greater Miami, and conducted extensive genealogical research. An academic and personal area of interest, used in genealogical and historical research, was DNA.

Lavender was also a frequent speaker to academic, civic, and genealogical groups, with frequent presentations about the Sephardic Jews of Spain and Portugal, and their descendants in North America and South America. Recent presentations have included "The Secret Jews of Brazil." Other favorite topics include Miami Beach history, political behavior, and DNA, and recent presentations include "The Secret Society of Moses according to Flavio Barbiero." His academic visits included Portugal, Spain, and Israel.

== Organizations ==
Lavender was president of the Miami Beach Historical Association and president of the South Florida Association of Phi Beta Kappa. He was a member of Temple Beth Tov in West Miami, and was president of the Men's Club. He was a member of Hibiscus Lodge #275 of F. & A. M., and a 32nd degree Scottish Rite Freemason. He was a member of Mensa, and the board of directors of the Miami chapter of the American Civil Liberties Union (ACLU). He was a life member of the Jewish War Veterans of the United States.

== Books ==
- Miami Beach in 1920: The Making of a Winter Resort. Charleston: Arcadia Publishing, 2002.
- Black Communities in Transition: Voices from South Florida. Lanham, Maryland: University Press of America, 1996 (edited, with Adele S. Newson).
- Jewish Farmers of the Catskills: A Century of Survival. Gainesville: University Press of Florida, 1995 (with Clarence Steinberg).
- French Huguenots: From Mediterranean Catholics to White Anglo-Saxon Protestants. New York, Bern: Peter Lang Publishing, Inc., 1990.
- Ethnic Women and Feminist Values: Toward a 'New' Value System. Lanham, Maryland: University Press of America, 1986.
- A Coat of Many Colors: Jewish Subcommunities in the United States. Westport, Connecticut: Greenwood Press, 1977 (edited).
- Journal of Spanish, Portuguese, and Italian Crypto Jews. Miami, Florida. Volume 1, 2, 3, 4, 5, 6, 7, and 8. (from 2009 to 2016)
