= DDS =

DDS may refer to:

== Arts and media ==
- Digimon Data Squad, season 5 of the anime Digimon.
- Shin Megami Tensei: Digital Devil Saga, a 2004 video game spun off from the Shin Megami Tensei series
- Dmitri Dmitriyevich Shostakovich, Russian composer
- Death's Dynamic Shroud, American electronic and vaporwave trio

== Organizations ==
=== Government agencies ===
- Disability Determination Service, a state agency in the United States that determines eligibility for federal disability benefits
- Department of Driver Services, also known as Department of Motor Vehicles
- Department of Social Security, a defunct governmental agency in the United Kingdom
- Due Diligence System

=== Private organizations ===
- Davao Death Squad, a vigilante group in Davao City, Philippines
- Davidson Day School, a pre-K–12 school in Davidson, North Carolina, United States
- De Danske Skytteforeninger, a Danish sports organization
- Diehard Duterte Supporters, supporters of Rodrigo Duterte, 16th president of the Philippines
- Donovan Data Systems, a software and computer services company
- Dutchess Day School, private pre-K through 8th grade school in Millbrook, New York, United States

== Science and technology ==
=== Chemistry ===
- Dimethyldichlorosilane, an organosilicon compound
- Dammarenediol II synthase, an enzyme

=== Computing and information technology ===
- Direct Digital Synthesis / Direct digital synthesizer, a method for generation of periodic digital signals and used for creating arbitrary waveforms from a reference clock
- Data Definition Specification, in software data management
- Data Description Specifications, in AS/400 programming
- Data Distribution Service, an Object Management Group standard for publish/subscribe middleware for distributed systems
- Data dictionary system of ICL's VME operating system; see ICL VME#QuickBuild
- Dataphone Digital Service or Digital Data System, types of leased line
- Digital Data Storage, a storage tape format related to Digital Audio Tape (DAT)
- Dimensional Data Storage
- DirectDraw Surface, .dds texture files
- Dynamic digital signage

=== Medicine ===
- Dapsone, also known as diaminodiphenyl sulfone (DDS), an antibiotic commonly used for the treatment of leprosy
- Doctor of Dental Surgery, a professional dental degree
- Dopamine dysregulation syndrome, a condition connected with treatment for Parkinson's disease
- Drug delivery systems, how drugs are delivered to relevant areas or tissues

=== Other uses in science and technology ===
- Dark dune spot, a feature of the Martian landscape
- Deflation Detection System, on motor vehicle tires
- Dry deck shelter, a module that allows divers easy exit and entrance while a submarine is submerged

== Other uses ==
- Dewey Decimal Classification, often called the Dewey Decimal System
- Direct Delivery Scheme, of the Society of Independent Brewers
- Danaher Death Squad, a former submission grappling team.
- Duterte Diehard Supporters, a label mostly associated with the supporters of former Philippine president Rodrigo Duterte
