= James A. Robinson (American political scientist) =

American academic (1932–2018)

James Arthur Robinson (1932 – May 7, 2018) was an American academic who from 1974 to 1987 served as the second president of the University of West Florida (UWF).

== Life and career ==
Robinson received his doctorate in political science from Northwestern University in 1958. After a stint at Ohio State University, he subsequently became a professor at UWF, where as president, he established the Marion Viccars Award, which recognizes superior performance and accomplishments of faculty and administrators at UWF. In 1979, as president, Robinson restructured the university's colleges to traditional arts and sciences, business and education, and switched the university to a semester basis in 1981.

Following his tenure as UWF president, Robinson focused his academic efforts on issues such as democratization and Taiwan electoral politics.

Robinson died on May 7, 2018, at the age of 85.

== Selected works ==
- Decision-making in Congress (1965)
- State Legislative Innovation (1973)
- He is also the author of a biography of President Richard Nixon.

Educational offices
Preceded by Harold Crosby	President of University of West Florida; 1974 – 1987	Succeeded by Morris L. Marx
