= Patrece Charles-Freeman =

- Education: Northern Caribbean University
- Occupations: Environmental health consultant, politician for Jamaica Labour Party

Patrece Charles-Freeman is a Jamaican public and environmental health consultant, as well as a political candidate with the Jamaica Labour Party (JLP).

== Early life and education ==
Charles-Freeman lived in the United States while doing her bachelor's at the University of Miami and her Master of Public Health at Florida International University.

She returned to Jamaica for her doctorate in environmental and public health at the University of the West Indies, where she wrote her dissertation on the health effects of the Halse Hall bauxite mines and alumina refineries on residents of Clarendon Parish.

== Career ==
After graduating from the University of the West Indies, Charles-Freeman worked as the director of health care with Food for the Poor. She went on to complete a master's degree in counselling psychology at the Northern Caribbean University in 2010. Later that year, she founded the Phoenix Counselling Centre, an organisation which aims to improve the physical, emotional, psychological, and social well-being of inner-city families; her work there includes play therapy with disadvantaged children.

=== In government and politics ===
Charles-Freeman rose to public attention through her work with the Jamaica Anti-Doping Commission (JADCO), of which she served as executive director from the passage of The Anti-Doping in Sport Act (2008) until her resignation in September 2011. Under Charles-Freeman's tenure, JADCO implemented programmes to combat doping in sport as mandated by the World Anti-Doping Agency, focusing particularly on education of junior athletes.

In 2010, she began efforts to introduce doping control in schools, as well as to expand out-of-competition testing. A major test for her during her work with JADCO was the case she pursued against Steve Mullings, whose positive test for a banned substance resulted in his disqualification from the 2011 World Championships in Athletics in Daegu, South Korea.

After stepping down from her position at JADCO, Charles-Freeman ran in the 2011 election as the JLP candidate for East St Thomas, succeeding Jairzenho Bailey as the JLP's caretaker in the constituency.

She renounced U.S. citizenship in August that year to qualify for nomination. Charles-Freeman faced off against Fenton Ferguson of the People's National Party in the election; Ferguson was the man who had originally defeated her father Pearnel Charles in the 1993 election which ended the JLP's forty-five year hold on the same East St Thomas constituency. In the end, Ferguson defeated Charles-Freeman, though by just 8,018 votes to Charles-Freeman's 7,547, a far smaller margin than the two thousand votes he had originally predicted. Ferguson credited Charles-Freeman's strong performance to efforts at improving turnout among erstwhile JLP voters who had not cast ballots in a long time.

== Personal life ==
Charles-Freeman is the daughter of JLP stalwart Pearnel Charles. She was married to Horace Freeman, with whom she has two children.
