= Pearnel Charles =

Jamaican politician

The Honourable Pearnel Charles OJ, CD, MP

Member of the Jamaica Parliament for Clarendon North Central
- In office 2002–2020
- Preceded by: George Lyn
- Succeeded by: Robert Nesta Morgan

Speaker of the Jamaica House of Representatives
- In office 10 March 2016 – 11 August 2020
- Preceded by: Michael Peart
- Succeeded by: Marisa Dalrymple-Philibert

Minister of Labour and Social Security
- In office 2007–2012

Personal details
- Born: August 31, 1936 (age 90) Brown's Town, Colony of Jamaica, British Empire
- Party: JLP
- Spouse: Gloria Charles (m. 1970)
- Children: Pearnel Jr.; Patrece; Michelle
- Education: City College of New York, Northern Caribbean University

Pearnel Patroe Charles OJ CD (born 31 August 1936) is a Jamaican politician with the Jamaica Labour Party who was the Speaker of the House of Representatives.

== Early life ==
Charles was born in Brown’s Town, St. Ann on 31 August 1936. He attended Lime Tree Garden Elementary School, West Indies College, and the City College of the University of New York where he was President of the West Indian Students' Association. He graduated from City College with a bachelor's degree in political science, after which he returned to Jamaica.

== Career ==
Charles became vice-president of the Bustamante Industrial Trade Union. In 1969, he was appointed as a Parish Councillor in the Kingston and St. Andrew Corporation. From 1972 to 1980 he was a senator and an elected member of parliament representing Eastern St. Thomas. Charles was the deputy leader of the Jamaica Labour Party (JLP) from 1972 to 1991. In June 1976, after a state of emergency was declared by the People's National Party, Charles was detained by armed forces and brought to Kingston for questioning. In 2002, he successfully ran as a JLP candidate for North Central Clarendon. He served as the Minister of Labour and Social Security in Jamaica from 2007 to 2012. In March 2016, he was elected as Speaker of the House of Representatives.

== 1992 Jamaica Labour Party conference incident ==
On 18 July 1992, during the private session of the Jamaica Labour Party’s 49th annual conference at the National Arena in Kingston, Pearnel Charles and several of his delegates from the East St. Thomas constituency were assaulted while attempting to enter the venue. Men wearing T-shirts marked “Security” reportedly attacked them and tore up some of their admission cards. Charles later stated that he was struck by bottles and was saved from further harm by other members of the security team. One of the assailants was reported to have said that Charles and his supporters would not be allowed to enter because they intended to “diss” (disrespect) party leader Edward Seaga.

Fellow former minister Douglas Vaz, who arrived later with delegates from North Central St. Andrew, described the events as “the most shameful day” in the party’s history and said the disruption appeared organised. Vaz stated that his own delegates left the Arena early and advised him not to enter.

The incident took place against the background of lingering tensions from the earlier “Gang of Five” dispute within the party. A subsequent internal enquiry by the three-member Bovell Committee investigated the allegations of harassment and security failures. The JLP’s standing committee accepted the committee’s findings and recommendations on improved security arrangements for future conferences, while maintaining that there had been no plan by the party leadership to exclude Charles or his delegates.

Charles later characterised the episode as a challenge that ultimately strengthened his political resolve. He continued his career in the JLP and returned to Parliament in 2002 as the member for North Central Clarendon.

== 1990 Spy Scandal and the "Gang of Five" Rebellion ==
Following the Jamaica Labour Party's (JLP) defeat in the 1989 general election, Charles became a leading voice calling for structural reforms and greater internal democracy within the party's leadership. This friction precipitated a severe internal crisis in April 1990 when former JLP Senator Abe Dabdoub presented an intercepted letter and audio recordings to the JLP Central Executive exposing an illegal, internal wiretapping operation. The evidence revealed that Charles' private telephone lines and strategic meeting spaces had been tapped by an operative, John "Jackie" Bell, who was supplied with equipment by former Senator Olivia "Babsy" Grange to monitor Charles' inner circle for signs of a leadership challenge.

The exposure of the espionage apparatus solidified a distinct dissident faction consisting of Charles and four other former cabinet ministers: Karl Samuda, Edmund Bartlett, Errol Anderson, and Douglas Vaz. Dubbed the "Gang of Five" by pollster Professor Carl Stone, the group launched an open challenge against the autocratic leadership style of JLP Leader Edward Seaga. In response, Seaga deployed administrative and disciplinary counter-measures. In May 1990, Charles and his faction exercised heavy backdoor influence during internal party elections, routing Seaga's inner circle by voting down Grange's nomination to the Standing Committee by a crushing landslide margin of 21 out of roughly 200 votes.

The leadership sought to neutralize the dissidents by requiring all JLP parliamentarians to sign a strict loyalty oath regarding collective responsibility, which Charles and other members of the five strongly resisted. Seeking to divide the faction, Seaga extended a conditional olive branch in October 1990, offering to restore official lines of communication with Charles, Bartlett, Anderson, and Vaz on the condition that they individually and in writing denounce their affiliation with the group, while completely isolating Karl Samuda for expulsion.

In a public analysis on October 22, 1990, Carl Stone accused Charles of executing a media-centered warfare strategy to force Seaga's psychological withdrawal without mounting a direct constitutional challenge, aiming to clear a path for his own leadership ambitions against Seaga's preferred successor, Bruce Golding. Concurrently, Golding broadcast an ultimatum stating that the faction would be permanently removed if they did not publicly dissociate from Dabdoub's spying charges, which Charles flatly refused to do, stating he had no quarrel with the whistleblower. While the crisis fractured the group, Charles suffered deep political and financial strain, funding social programs in his constituency out of pocket as official party goodwill withered. Charles characterized the expulsions as exceptionally harsh and "one of the darker decisions taken by a political party," maintaining that the conspiracy charges were completely contrived. Charles would later publish his account of the era in his book, A Cry from the Grassroots, alleging that the "Gang of Five" never existed as a coherent plot but was an invention weaponized by his political rivals.

=== Legal Challenge: Charles v. Golding (1991) ===
Charles challenged the party's central executive in the landmark lawsuit Pearnel Charles v. Bruce Golding and Ryan Peralto (1991), following an October 1990 letter delivered by Golding that stripped Charles of his approved candidate status. Presided over by Justice Chester Orr and later reaching the Court of Appeal (Bruce Golding v. Pearnel Charles), the case set a historic precedent regarding judicial review over the internal rules of political organizations.

== Personal life ==
His daughter Patrece Charles-Freeman is a public health consultant and Counselling Psychologist, and also ran as the JLP candidate in East St Thomas in the 2011 election. His son Pearnel Patroe Charles Jr. serves the people of Jamaica as the member of parliament for Clarendon South Eastern and the Minister of Labour and Social Security.
