= Frost Art Museum =

Art museum and sculpture park in Florida, United States

The Patricia & Phillip Frost Art Museum
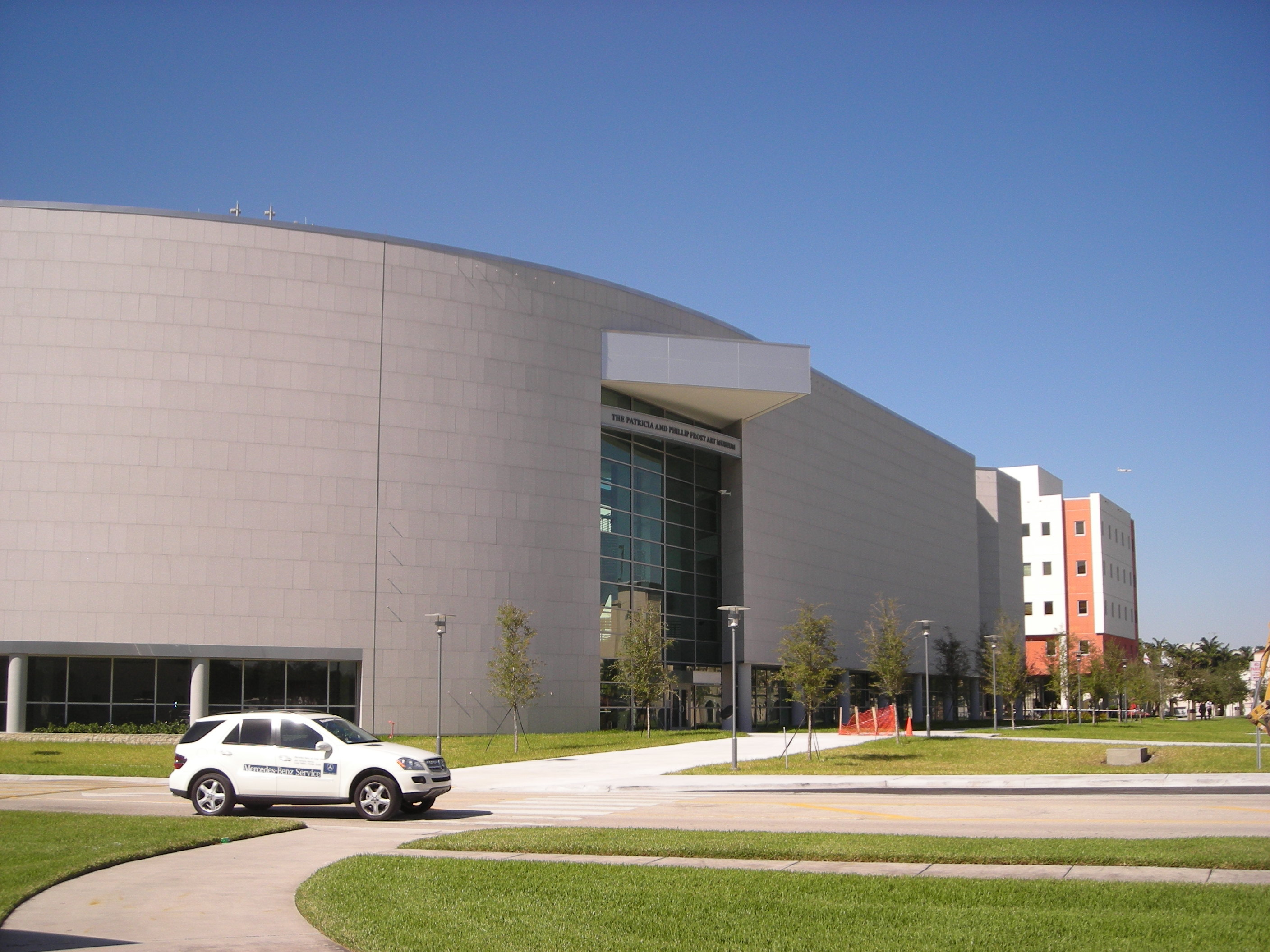
- Frost Art Museum
- Interactive fullscreen map
- Established: 1977
- Location: Florida International University; University Park, Florida, United States
- Coordinates: 25°45′13″N 80°22′23″W
- Type: Art museum, Sculpture park
- Director: Miriam Machado
- Curator: Natalia Zuluaga
- Website: frost.fiu.edu

The Patricia and Phillip Frost Art Museum (Note: or simply known as Frost Art Museum) is an art museum located in the Modesto A. Maidique campus of Florida International University in Miami, Florida. Founded in 1977 as 'The Art Museum at Florida International University', it was renamed after Phillip Frost and Patricia Frost in 2003.

The museum's collection includes contemporary art from the United States, Latin America, and the Caribbean. The museum was accredited by the American Alliance of Museums in 1999, and it is also a member of the Smithsonian Affiliations program. It was ranked as "Miami's Best Art Museum" by the Miami New Times in 2009.

== Principal collections ==
The Frost Art Museum's Permanent Collection includes nearly 6,000 objects from several different collections: the General Collection, the Metropolitan Museum and Art Center Collection and the Betty Laird Perry Emerging Artist Collection.

The General Collection holds American printmaking from the 1960s and 1970s, photography, Pre-Columbian objects dating from 200 to 500 AD, and a growing number of works by contemporary Caribbean and Latin American artists. The museum continues to expand the collection through private donations, purchases and acquisitions.

The Metropolitan Museum and Art Center Collection was donated to the Frost Art Museum to ensure its intact survival in 1989, when the Metropolitan Museum and Art Center of Coral Gables, Florida closed. This collection of more than 2,300 objects includes sculptures, photographs, paintings by 20th-century figures, a collection of American prints from the 1960s, sculptural works, photographs, Japanese Netsukes and ancient bronzes from Asian and African cultures.

In support of the university's studio arts program, the Betty Laird Perry Emerging Artist Collection comprises artworks obtained through purchase awards granted to selected BFA and MFA students graduating from the program since 1980. Numerous award recipients have continued to garner national and international recognition as mature artists.

== Architecture ==
The museum was originally housed in an administrative building on Florida International University's campus. It later added numerous outdoor scultupres, and, in 2008, the museum expanded to a much large dedicated facility (46,000 square feet, compared to less than 7,000 at the previous location). The new Frost Art Museum was designed by Yann Weymouth of Hellmuth Obata + Kassabaum (HOK) and features a three-story glass entrance atrium with a suspended staircase leading to the second and third floors. The ground floor houses a café and museum shop, the Dahlia Morgan Members' Lounge, as well as the Steven & Dorothea Green Auditorium and Lecture Hall.

To protect the collection from potential flooding, the 10,000 sq ft (930 m^{2}) of gallery space is located on the upper two floors of the building, alongside room to store the collection and space for research, preparation, and conservation of artworks. The gallery lighting was designed by Arup Group Lighting and makes heavy use of natural light via a system of skylights and diffusing petal arrays. Three of the nine galleries are dedicated to the permanent collection, while the remaining six galleries feature temporary exhibitions.

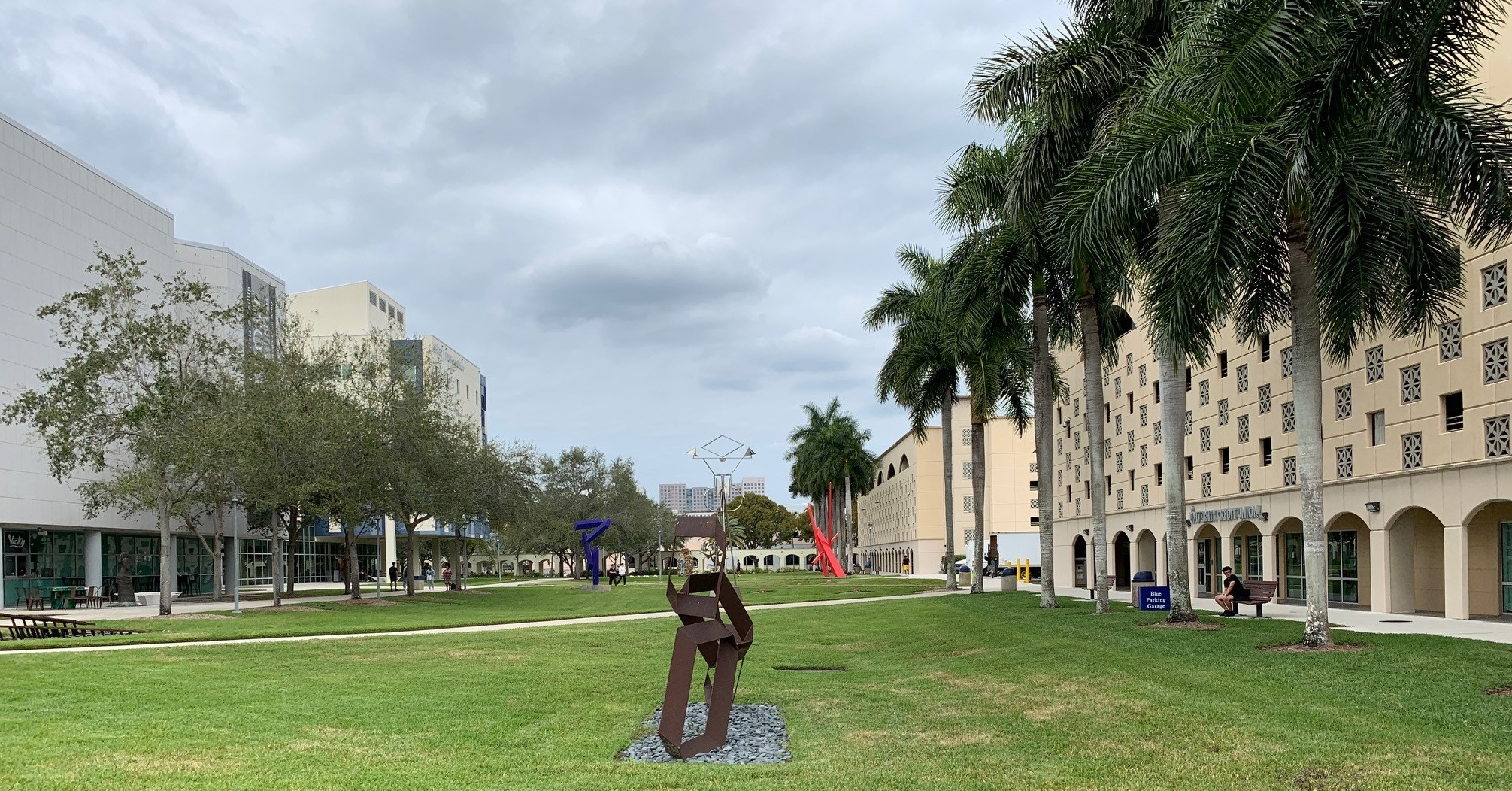
The Sculpture Park located by the Frost Art Museum.

On its lakeside site, the new building frames the "Avenue of the Arts." Selected works from the museum's outdoor sculpture collection line the Avenue of the Arts, which connects the museum, the Wertheim Performing Arts Center and the Management and Advanced Research Center (MARC) on the Modesto A. Maidique campus.

== Gallery ==
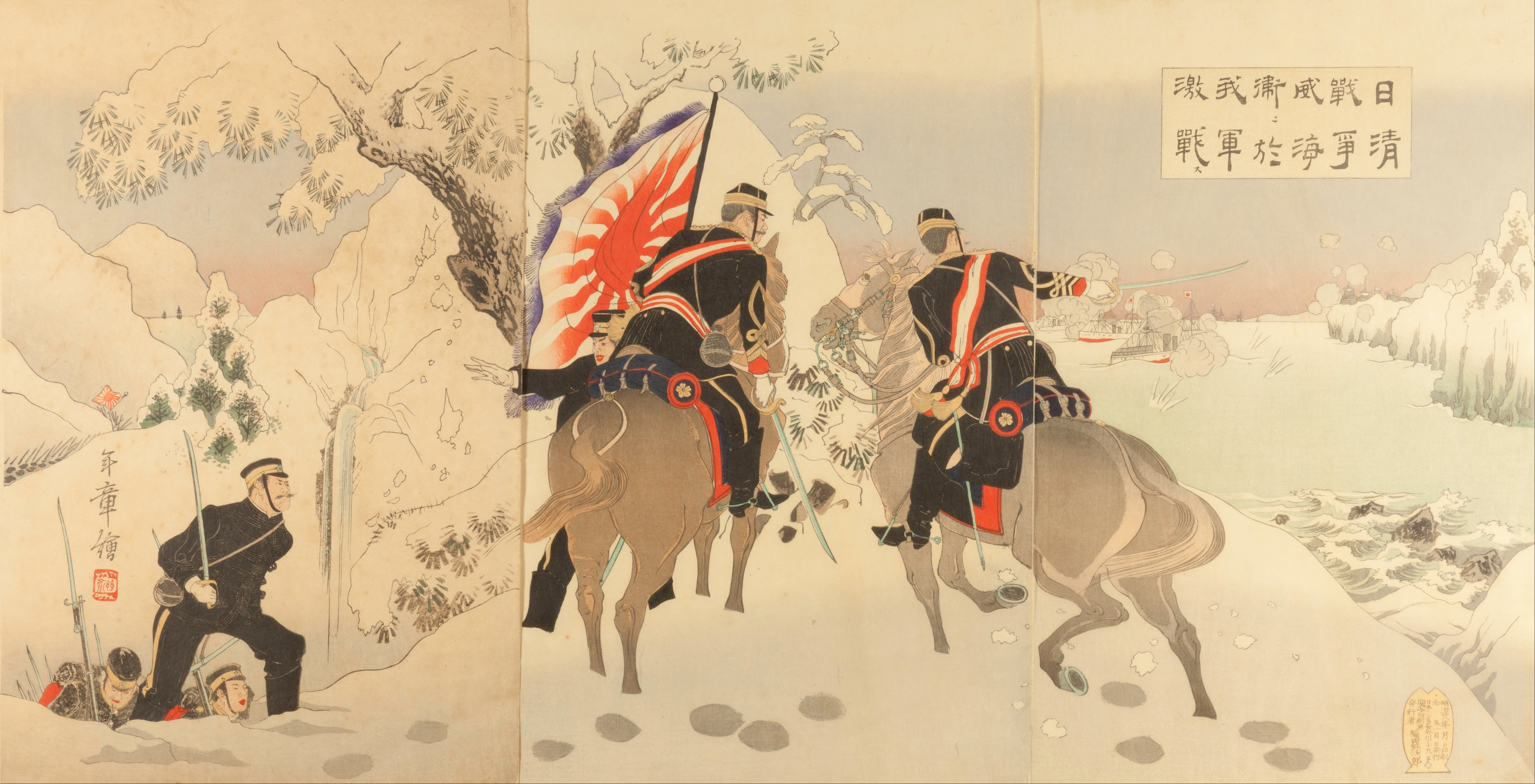
Toshiaki - Sino-Japanese War

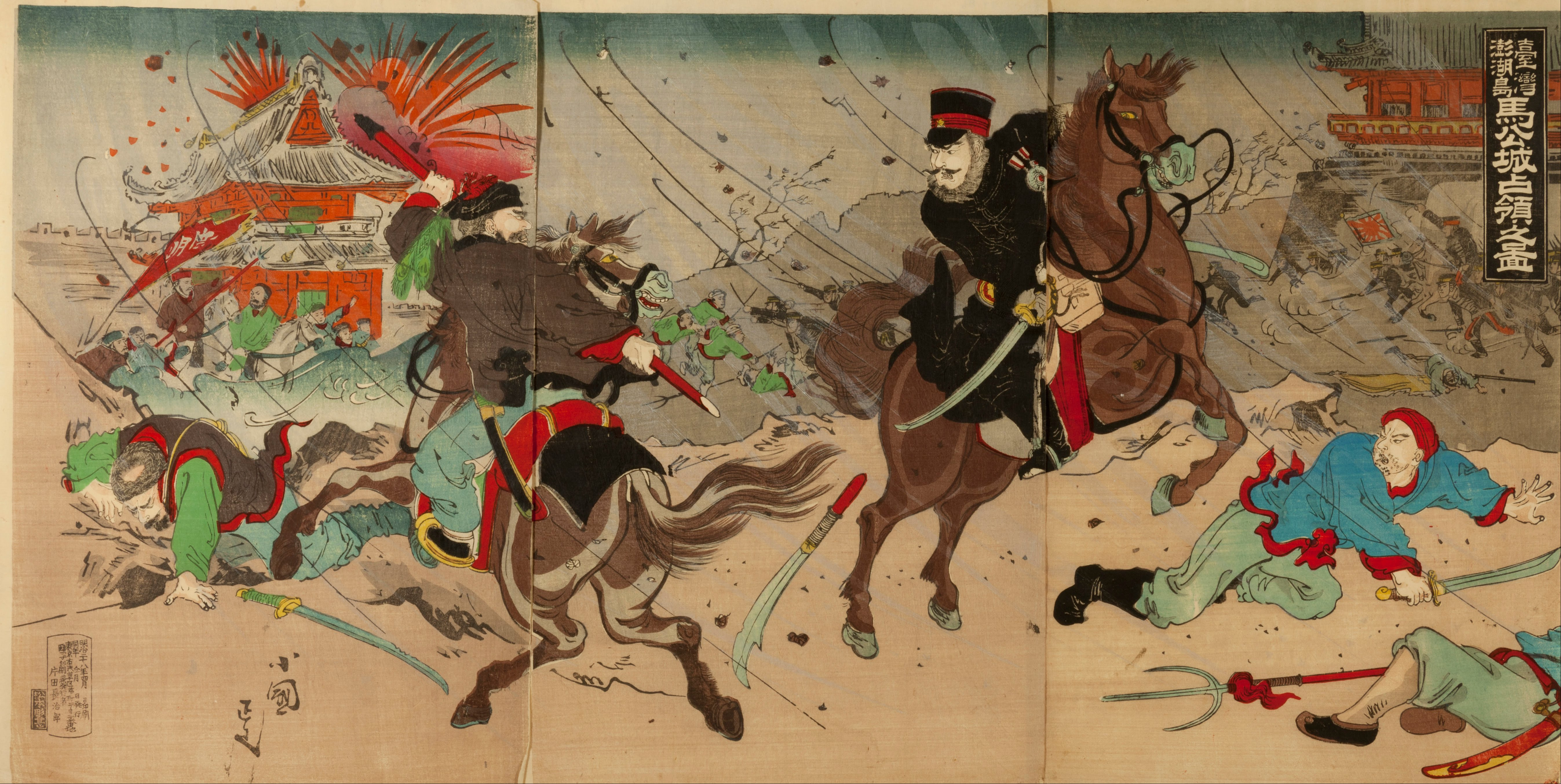
UtagawaKokunimasa - Illustration of Capture of Bakō castle

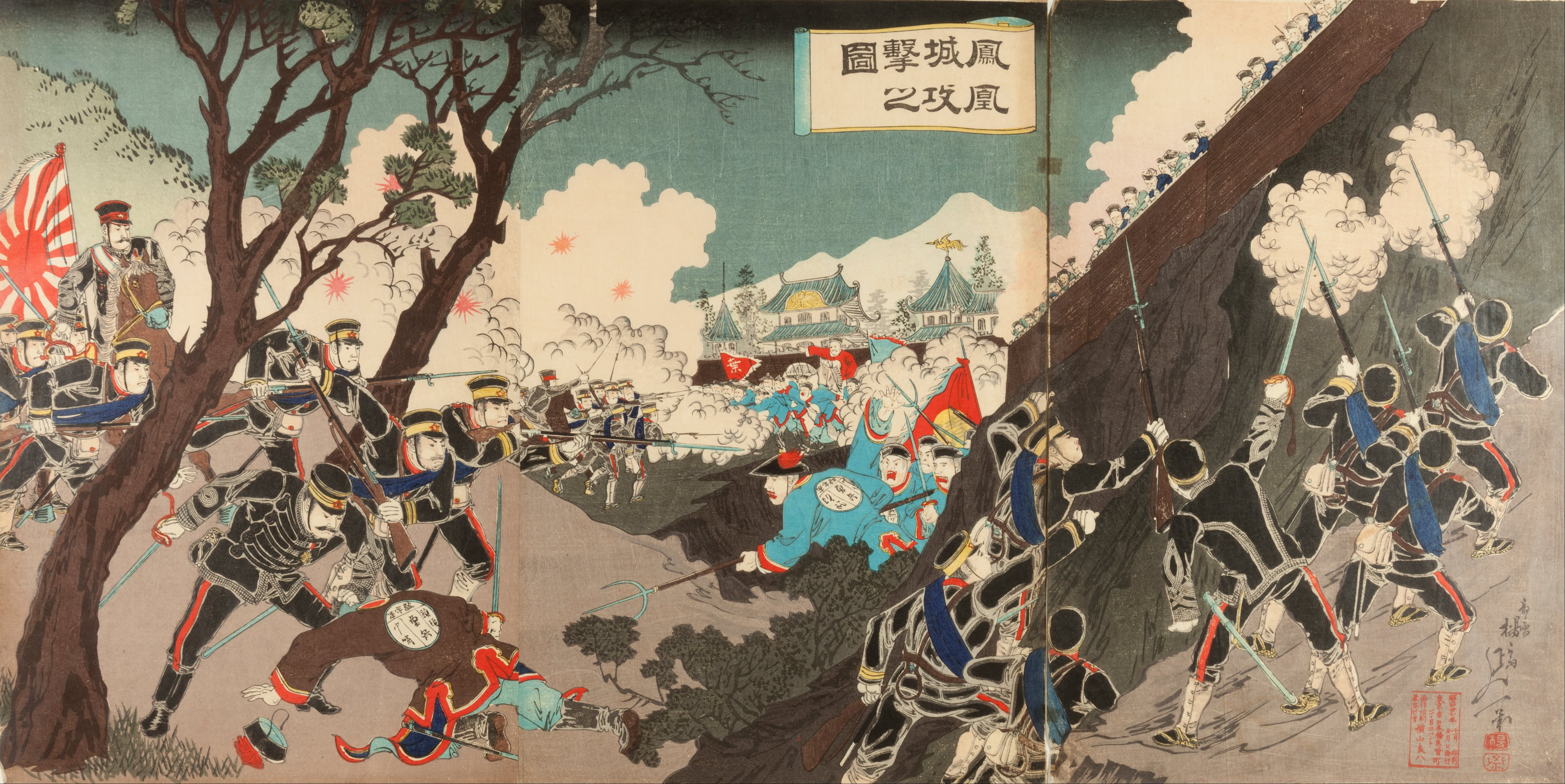
Watanabe Nobukazu - Illustration of the Attack on the Hōōjyo

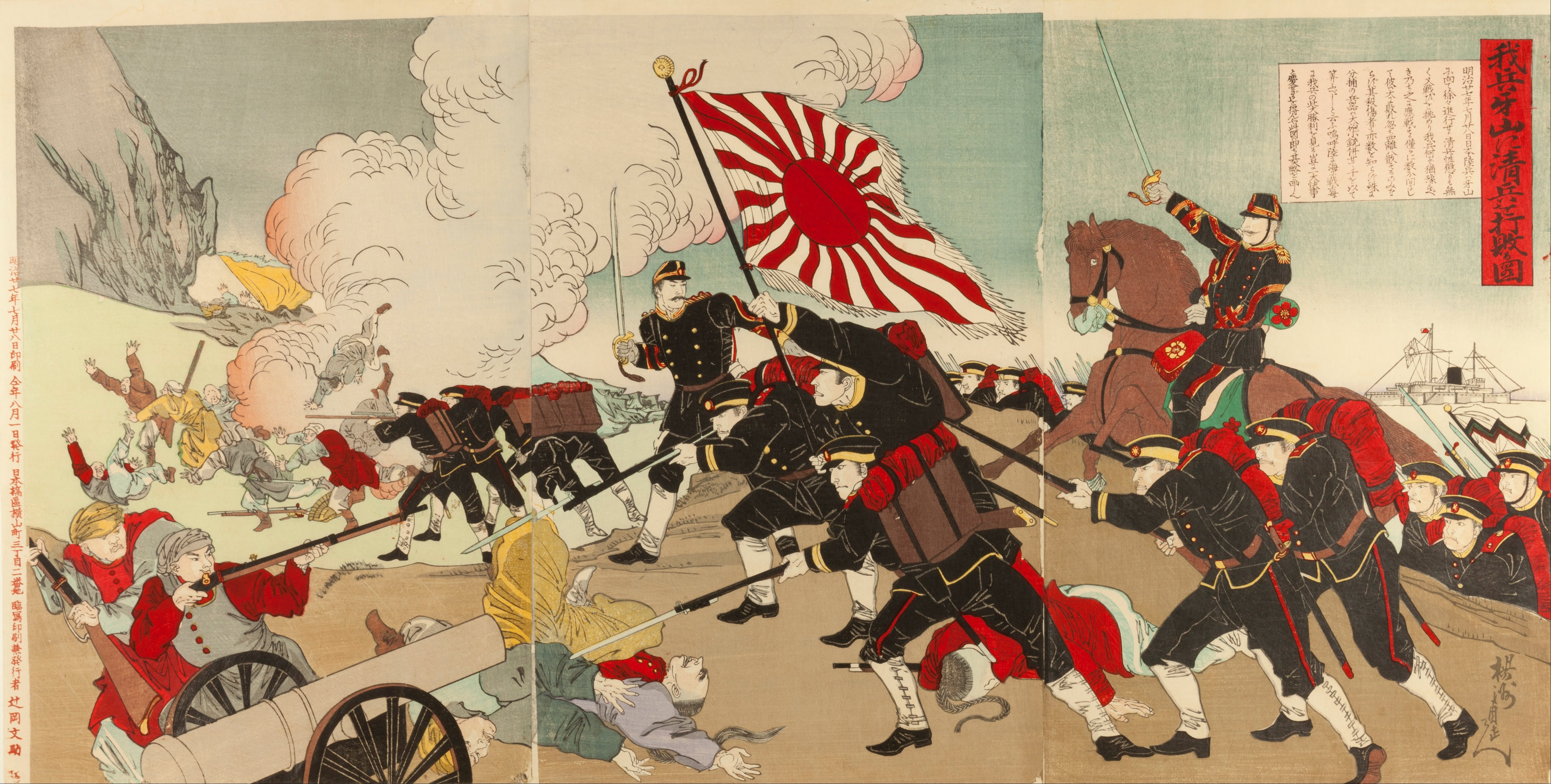
Yoshu Chikanobu - Our Army Crushes the Manchu Army

== See also ==
- Education in Miami
