= American Beauty =

American Beauty may refer to:

== Arts and media ==
=== Books ===
- American Beauty (Ferber novel), a 1931 novel by Edna Ferber
- American Beauty (Dean novel), a 2006 novel by Zoey Dean in the A-List series

=== Film ===
- American Beauty (1999 film), a 1999 film starring Kevin Spacey and Annette Bening
- American Beauty (1927 film), a lost 1927 silent film romantic drama
- The American Beauty (1916 film), a lost silent film
- La Belle Américaine (The American Beauty), a 1961 film by and starring Robert Dhéry

=== Music ===
==== Albums ====
- American Beauty (album), a 1970 album by the Grateful Dead
- American Beauty: Original Motion Picture Score, the original score to the 1999 film
- American Beauty (soundtrack), a soundtrack to the 1999 film
- American Beauty (EP), a 2014 EP by Bruce Springsteen (or its title track)
- American Beauty/American Psycho, a 2015 album by Fall Out Boy (or its title track)
- American Beauty, 1998 album by The Nashville Bluegrass Band

==== Songs ====
- "American Beauty", by Bruce Springsteen from American Beauty (EP), 2014
- "American Beauty", by Pat Boone from Yes Indeed!, 1958
- "American Beauty", by Fall Out Boy from American Beauty/American Psycho, 2015
- "American Beauty", by Nessa Barrett from Aftercare (Deluxe Edition), 2025

==== Other ====
- American Beauty Rag, a 1913 composition for solo piano by Joseph Lamb.

== Other uses ==
- Rosa 'American Beauty', a hybrid perpetual rose
- The chess game Levitsky versus Marshall

== See also ==
- "American Beauty Rose" (song), a 1961 single by Frank Sinatra
- American Beauty/American Psycho (album), 2015 album by Fall Out Boy
- American Beauty/American Psycho Tour (concert tour), a 2015 concert tour by Fall Out Boy
- "American Beauty/American Psycho" (song), a 2014 song by Fall Out Boy off the eponymous album American Beauty/American Psycho
- American (disambiguation)
- Beauty (disambiguation)
