= University Park, Florida =

- Neighborhood and Former CDP
- Location in Miami-Dade County and the state of Florida

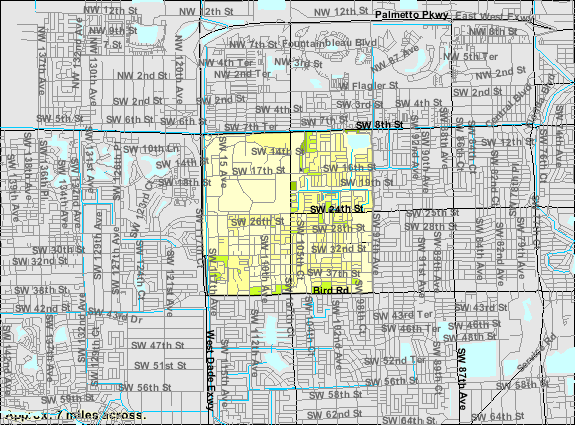
- U.S. Census Bureau map showing CDP boundaries
- Coordinates: 25°44′43″N 80°21′58″W
- Country: United States
- State: Florida
- County: Miami-Dade

Area
  - Total: 4.1 sq mi (10.6 km^{2})
  - Land: 4.1 sq mi (10.5 km^{2})
  - Water: 0.039 sq mi (0.1 km^{2})
- Elevation: 3.3 ft (1 m)

Population (2000)
  - Total: 26,538
  - Density: 6,484/sq mi (2,503.6/km^{2})
- Time zone: UTC-5 (Eastern (EST))
  - Summer (DST): UTC-4 (EDT)
- ZIP codes: 33165, 33174, 33175, 33199
- FIPS code: 12-73287
- GNIS feature ID: 1853297

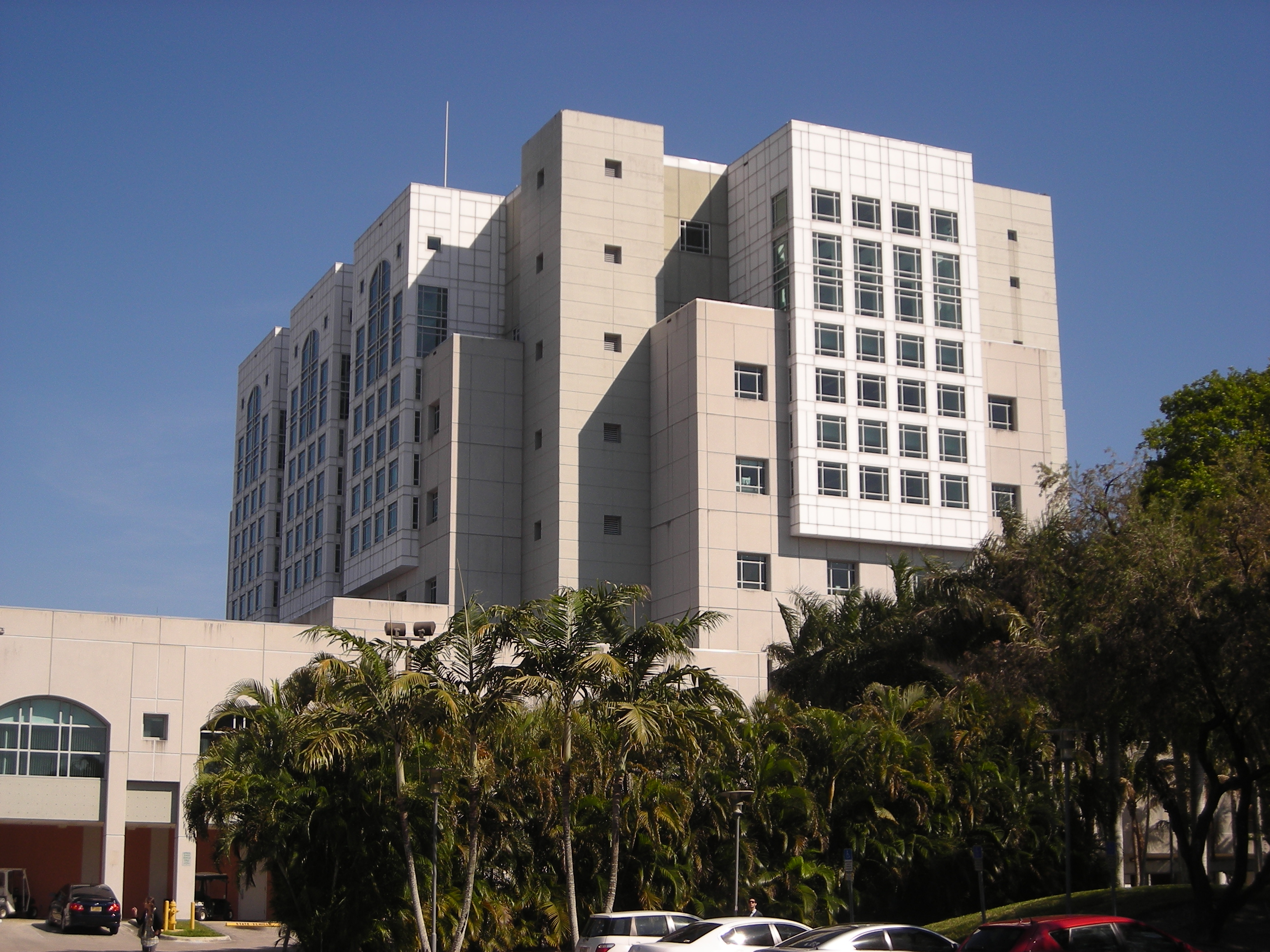
Green Library at FIU's University Park campus is the university's largest building and the largest library in the Southeastern United States.

University Park is a neighborhood and former census-designated place (CDP) located in an unincorporated area of western Miami-Dade County, Florida, United States. It was merged into Westchester CDP for the 2020 U.S. census. In 2010, the population was 26,995. It encompasses the Modesto A. Maidique Campus of Florida International University and the Fair Expo Center, and was the former name of the former's campus.

== History ==
The area developed around the Tamiami Campus of Florida International University, which was established on the site of the former Tamiami Airport. During FIU’s early years, airport hangars were repurposed as classrooms and portions of the former runways were used for parking. As development expanded westward in Miami-Dade County, the surrounding area became known as University Park after the university campus. In June 2009, the Florida International University Board of Trustees approved renaming the University Park Campus as the Modesto A. Maidique Campus in honour of former university president Modesto A. Maidique. The official naming ceremony was scheduled for autumn the same year.

== Description ==
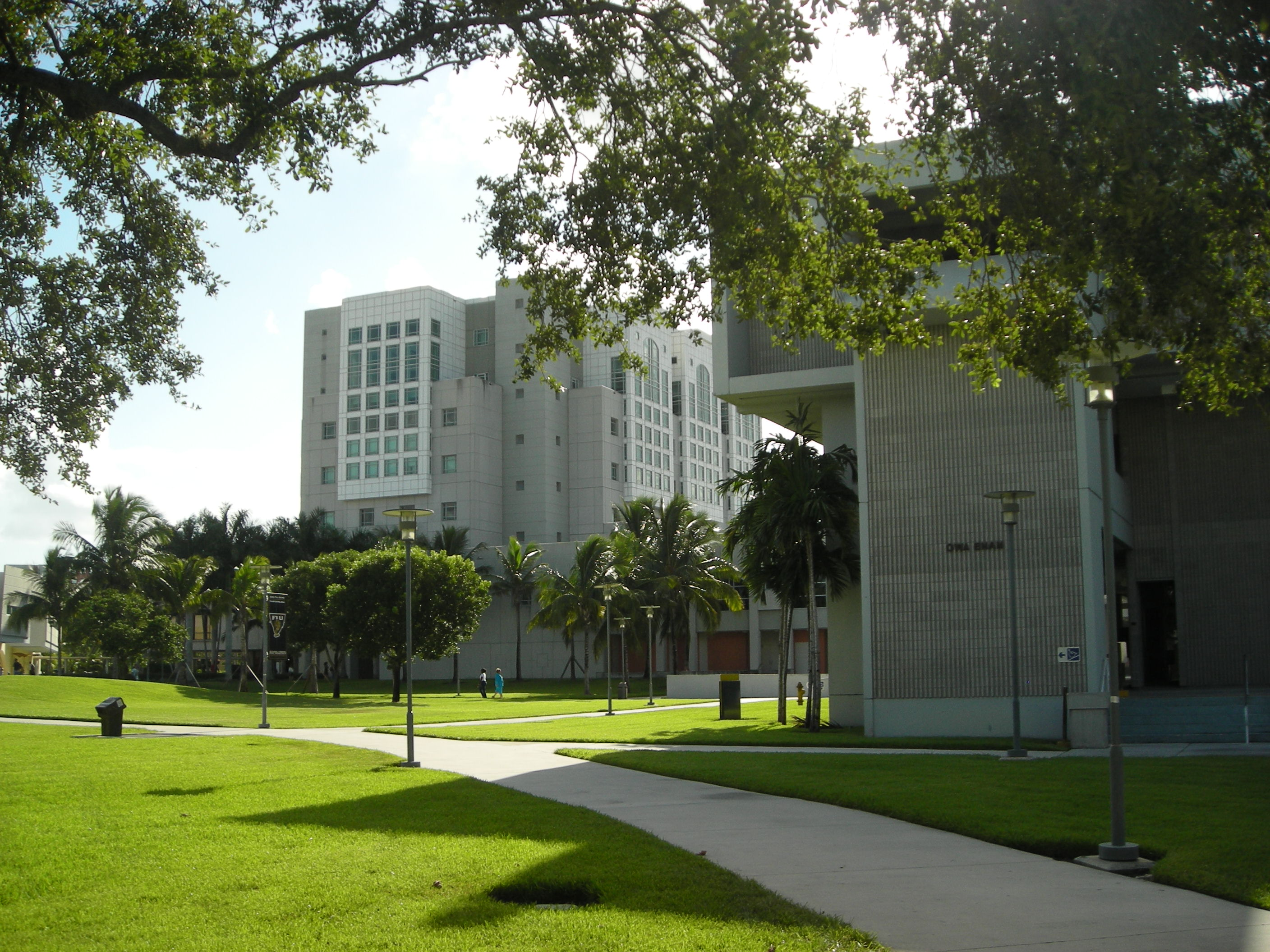
Green Library and Owa Ehan at Florida International University.

The Modesto A. Maidique Campus of Florida International University is located in University Park and serves as the university’s principal campus. The campus encompasses approximately 342 acres (1.38 km^{2}). Today, University Park houses all of the campus's colleges and schools as well as all the administrative offices and main university facilities. Since 2001 University Park is also home to Reagan House (formally known as University House), the home of FIU's president. Further facilities include the Wertheim Performing Arts Center, the Frost Art Museum, the International Hurricane Research Center, and the university's athletic facilities such as Pitbull Stadium, FIU Baseball Stadium, and FIU Arena.

The Patricia and Phillip Frost Art Museum is a Smithsonian affiliate. Admission is free, and the museum houses a range of collections, from pre-Columbian objects dating from 200-500 AD to contemporary art.

Until the early-1990s, aerial pictures of the campus clearly revealed the features of the airport that used to occupy the land until 1969. Construction has obliterated all of these features, and only the University Tower remains as memory of the university's past. Today, the Modesto A. Maidique Campus is home to about 87% of the student population and 94% of housing students and serves as FIU’s principal campus. University Park is a lush, heavily vegetated campus, with many lakes and nature preserves, as well as an arboretum and has 92 buildings.FIU’s Nature Preserve occupies approximately 11 acres, designated as and contains three distinct ecosystems that provide habitat for 266 species of wildlife and numerous native plant species. Current and planned construction projects include new academic facilities, research buildings, student housing developments and an academic medical centre developed in partnership with Baptist Health South Florida.

In 2026, FIU announced plans for its first affiliated off-campus housing development near the Modesto A. Maidique Campus. The proposed 21-storey building is expected to provide approximately 820 student beds and is scheduled to open in Fall 2028.

== Geography ==
University Park is located at 25°44′43″N 80°21′58″W (25.745178, -80.366124).

According to the United States Census Bureau, the CDP has a total area of 10.6 km^{2} (4.1 mi^{2}). 10.5 km^{2} (4.1 mi^{2}) of it is land and 0.1 km^{2} (0.04 mi^{2}) of it (0.98%) is water.

== Demographics ==
Historical population
Census	Pop.	Note	%±
2000	26,538		—
2010	26,995		1.7%

The CDP was deleted prior to the 2020 U.S. census.

=== Racial and ethnic composition ===
University Park CDP, Florida – Racial and ethnic composition Note: the US Census treats Hispanic/Latino as an ethnic category. This table excludes Latinos from the racial categories and assigns them to a separate category. Hispanics/Latinos may be of any race.
Race / Ethnicity (NH = Non-Hispanic)	Pop 2000	Pop 2010	% 2000	% 2010
White alone (NH)	3,329	2,501	12.54%	9.26%
Black or African American alone (NH)	717	865	2.70%	3.20%
Native American or Alaska Native alone (NH)	7	4	0.03%	0.01%
Asian alone (NH)	403	502	1.52%	1.86%
Native Hawaiian or Pacific Islander alone (NH)	1	5	0.00%	0.02%
Other race alone (NH)	20	37	0.08%	0.14%
Mixed race or Multiracial (NH)	116	143	0.44%	0.53%
Hispanic or Latino (any race)	21,945	22,938	82.69%	84.97%
Total	26,538	26,995	100.00%	100.00%

According to the census of 2000, there were 26,538 people, 8,646 households, and 6,501 families residing in the CDP. The population density was 6,535.1 inhabitants per square mile (2,523.2/km^{2}). There were 9,047 housing units at an average density of 2,227.9 units per square mile (860.2 units/km^{2}). The racial makeup of the CDP was 89.04% White (of which 12.5% were non-Hispanic) 3.40% Black, 0.06% Native American, 1.59% Asian, 0.02% Pacific Islander, 3.38% from other races, and 2.51% from two or more races. Hispanic or Latino of any race were 82.69% of the population.

There were 8,646 households, out of which 27.1% had children under the age of 18 living with them, 55.3% were married couples living together, 15.2% had a female householder with no husband present, and 24.8% were non-families. 18.1% of all households were made up of individuals, and 9.4% had someone living alone who was 65 years of age or older. The average household size was 2.96 and the average family size was 3.32.

In the CDP, the population was spread out, with 17.6% under the age of 18, 14.7% from 18 to 24, 25.0% from 25 to 44, 23.7% from 45 to 64, and 19.0% who were 65 years of age or older. The median age was 39 years. For every 100 females, there were 84.3 males. For every 100 females age 18 and over, there were 80.6 males.

The median income for a household in the CDP was $40,039, and the median income for a family was $48,451. Males had a median income of $30,884 versus $25,861 for females. The per capita income for the CDP was $17,249. About 9.8% of families and 14.4% of the population were below the poverty line, including 13.3% of those under age 18 and 15.7% of those age 65 or over.

As of 2000, speakers of Spanish as a first language accounted for 86.45% of residents, while English made up 12.06%, and French as a mother tongue was at 0.45% of the population.

== Government and infrastructure ==
The National Weather Service Miami Office is on subleased area on the FIU campus, where it is co-located with the National Hurricane Center.

== Education ==
=== Colleges and universities ===
Florida International University Modesto A. Maidique Campus is located in University Park.

=== Primary and secondary schools ===
Miami-Dade County Public Schools operates public schools in University Park. Dr. Carlos J. Finlay Elementary School and Olympia Heights Elementary School are in University Park. Finlay is on the FIU campus.

St. Agatha Catholic School of the Roman Catholic Archdiocese of Miami is located in University Park.

== Athletics ==
FIU Baseball Stadium is located on the Modesto A. Maidique Campus and has a seating capacity of approximately 2,000 spectators. The playing field has a natural grass surface and measures of 325 feet (99 m) down the foul lines, 375 feet (114 m) to the power alleys, and 400 feet (120 m) to straightaway centre field.

In August 2024, FIU announced a ten-year naming rights agreement with the recording artist Pitbull, renaming FIU Stadium as Pitbull Stadium. The agreement was reported as the first instance of a college athletics venue being named after an artist.
