= Ragtime Nightingale =

1915 rag by Joseph Lamb

- by Joseph Lamb
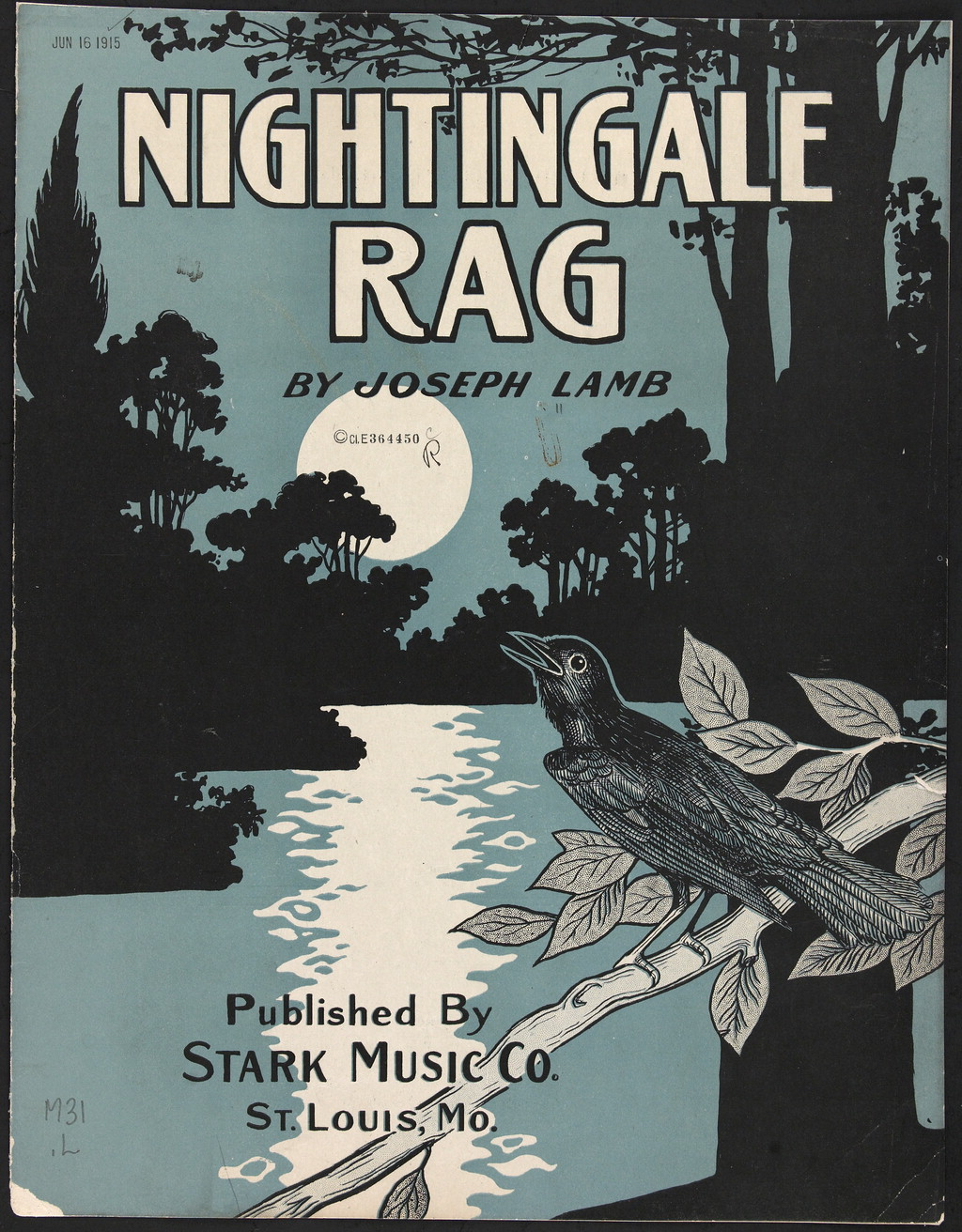
- Cover of the original score
- Key: C minor
- Year: 1915
- Time: 2/4
- Published: 1915 - St. Louis
- Publisher: Stark Music Co.
- Duration: 4 minutes approximately
- Scoring: Solo piano

Ragtime Nightingale, also known as Nightingale Rag, is a 1915 rag for solo piano by American composer Joseph Lamb. Considered by the composer to be one of his most difficult piano works, it is also among his best-known compositions.

== Background ==
Lamb's Nightingale Rag was inspired by James Scott's Ragtime Oriole (1911), as Lamb wanted to compose a piece that incorporated birdsong, despite the fact that Scott's composition itself did not actually contain any musical imitation of birdsong. The piece was written during the most prolific period of Lamb’s life, which lasted roughly from 1909 to 1919 and took place while he was living in and around New York City. Although composition was not his principal occupation and he primarily worked in the textile trade, these years produced many of his most significant ragtime works. During this period he also met Scott Joplin, who later introduced him to the well-known ragtime publisher John Stillwell Stark. The work was eventually published by Stark Music Co. in St. Louis on June 10, 1915.

== Structure ==
Lamb, Nightingale Rag
Performed by Constantin Stephan

This composition is approximately four minutes long and is scored for solo piano. It is centered around C minor, although it features significant key changes in different sections. Written in a constant 2/4 meter, it is marked Slow March Tempo at the beginning of the piece, with no further tempo indications appearing throughout. Dynamic changes are also relatively limited, generally fluctuating between mezzo-forte and mezzo-piano, with occasional sforzandos and a fortissimo final section. It was described by the composer himself as a “heavy” rag, meaning that its harmonies synthesize those of Joplin and Scott and are therefore more complex and difficult to perform. This contrasts with “light” rags, which are typically simpler and remain closer to the cakewalk tradition. The structure of the piece follows that of a common ragtime piece and can be summarized as follows:

- Introduction, in which the composer uses the theme from Section A to introduce the piece. It is a four-bar segment in C minor and is played mf.
- Section A. The main theme in the piece is presented in C minor and mp.
- Section A. This 16-bar section is repeated, as is customary in rags, with a different ending to introduce the next theme.
- Section B. The second theme appears, this time in the relative major of the key of the piece: E♭ major. This theme, a bit brighter than the previous one, is played mf. It also consists of 16 bars.
- Section B. The theme is presented again for consistency and, as with the other repetition, it has a different ending to introduce the next theme.
- Section A, which marks the return to C minor and mp. This time, this section is not repeated.
- Section C. The trio section modulates to A♭ major. Also brighter than the first theme, it features melodies in the upper register of the keyboard, probably imitating birdsong.
- Section C, restating the melody for consistency and finishing with a sforzando, therefore closing the segment and not leading into the next one.
- Transition, using a short motif from the last bar of Section C to lead into the next segment. This segment, which features a large crescendo, is in the dominant of E♭ major.
- Section B is presented for the last time, this time ff, bringing the work to its conclusion.

Although this rag incorporates elements that resemble and evoke birdsong, Lamb himself reportedly did not know what a nightingale actually sounded like. Consequently, the musical portrait of birds appears to derive from a more general impression of birdsong. The left-hand arpeggiated motif in the main theme of Section A was, in fact, adapted from the accompaniment to the melody of Frédéric Chopin’s Revolutionary Étude, which Lamb knew through The Etude magazine, of which his sister was an avid reader. It also drew influence from Ethelbert Nevin’s Nightingale Song, which was likewise published in The Etude and served as inspiration for Lamb, who quoted it in the trio and echoed it in the title itself, according to jazz historian Rudi Blesh.

== Recordings ==
One of Lamb's most famous rags, it was recorded frequently in the composer's lifetime. However, after ragtime declined in popularity, the work came to be performed primarily on albums dedicated to the preservation and presentation of ragtime history. The following is a list of recordings of the piece:

Recordings of Joseph Lamb's Ragtime Nightingale
| Piano | Date of recording | Place of recording | Label | Notes |
|---|---|---|---|---|
| Joshua Rifkin | August 1990 | St. George's Church, Bristol, England, UK | Decca | |
| Morten Gunnar Larsen | March 1998 | Potton Hall, Dunwich, Suffolk, England, UK | Decca | |
| Richard Dowling | August 2000 | Wertheim Performing Arts Center Concert Hall, Florida International University, Miami, Florida, USA | Klavier | |
| Marcus Schwarz | November 2012 | Pianocentrum franke, Marburg-Michelbach, Hesse, Germany | Antes Edition | |
