= Top Liner Rag =

1916 rag by Joseph Lamb

- Rag by Joseph Lamb
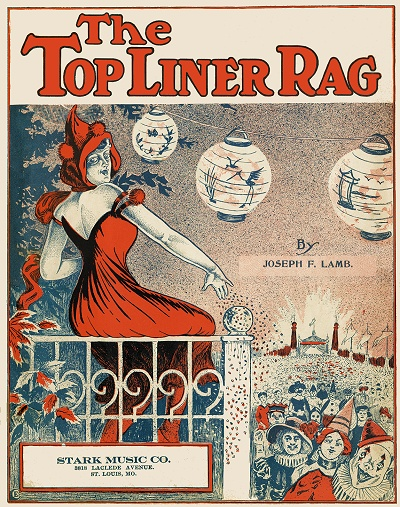
- Cover of the score
- Key: A♭ major
- Year: 1916
- Time: 2/4
- Published: 1916 - St. Louis
- Publisher: Stark Music Co.
- Duration: 4 minutes approximately
- Movements: 1
- Scoring: Solo piano

Top Liner Rag, sometimes entitled Topliner Rag, is a rag for solo piano by American ragtime composer Joseph Lamb. One of Lamb's most successful compositions, it was written in 1916.

== Background ==
Top Liner Rag was written at the height of Lamb's popularity and the ragtime era. It is one of the rags written for ragtime publisher John Stillwell Stark between 1909 and 1919. At the time, Lamb was working as an accountant for a textile firm, L. F. Dommerich & Co., based in New York, while composing popular music on the side. It was first published by Stark Music Co. on January 4, 1916, in St. Louis, Missouri. Two piano rolls were produced to preserve the piece: Felix Arndt, a pianist and composer from the 1920s, made a roll that was released by Metro Art and, subsequently, Howard Lutter, another famous musician who specialized in making piano rolls, also made another roll for Artempo.

== Structure ==
The structure of Top Liner Rag is similar to that of other rags. Including repeats, the piece is approximately four minutes long and consists of 148 bars. It is in a constant 2/4 meter and is in the key of A♭ major, although it modulates to D♭ major for the unnamed trio section. The score is marked "Slow march tempo", with no further tempo changes indicated. The piece is structured as follows:

Structure of Lamb's Top Liner Rag
Section		Bars	Key	Dynamics
Section A		16	A-flat major	mf
Section A (Repeat)		16	A-flat major	mf
Section B		16	A-flat major	f
Section B (Repeat)		16	A-flat major	f
Section A (Repeat)		16	A-flat major	mf
Trio	Introduction	4	D-flat major	f - p
Trio	Section C	16	D-flat major	mp
Trio	Section C (repeat)	16	D-flat major	mp
Trio	Section D	16	D-flat major	f
Trio	Section D (repeat)	16	D-flat major	f

This composition is one of Lamb's self-described "heavy" rags, that is, rags that are closer in style to the works of the major ragtime composers, Scott Joplin and James Scott, and are therefore denser in fingering, technique, and harmonic and melodic complexity. Like most ragtime compositions, Top Liner Rag makes extensive use of syncopation, which appears on a total of 82 out of the piece's 148 total bars.

== Recordings ==
The following is a list of recordings of the piece:

Recordings of Lamb's Top Liner Rag
Piano	Date of recording	Place of recording	Label	Notes
Joshua Rifkin	August 1990	St. George's Church, Bristol, England, UK	Decca	

== Reception ==
The rag was very well received in Lamb's lifetime, both by his contemporaries and by Lamb himself, who considered it his finest rag. He also described Wally Rose's recording of the piece, made in December 1957, as the best recording of any of his rags. Musicologists David Jasen and Trebor Tichenor wrote that Top Liner Rag was "undoubtedly [Lamb]'s best rag and among the three greatest rags of all time."
