= Kenneth A. Jessell =

American university administrator

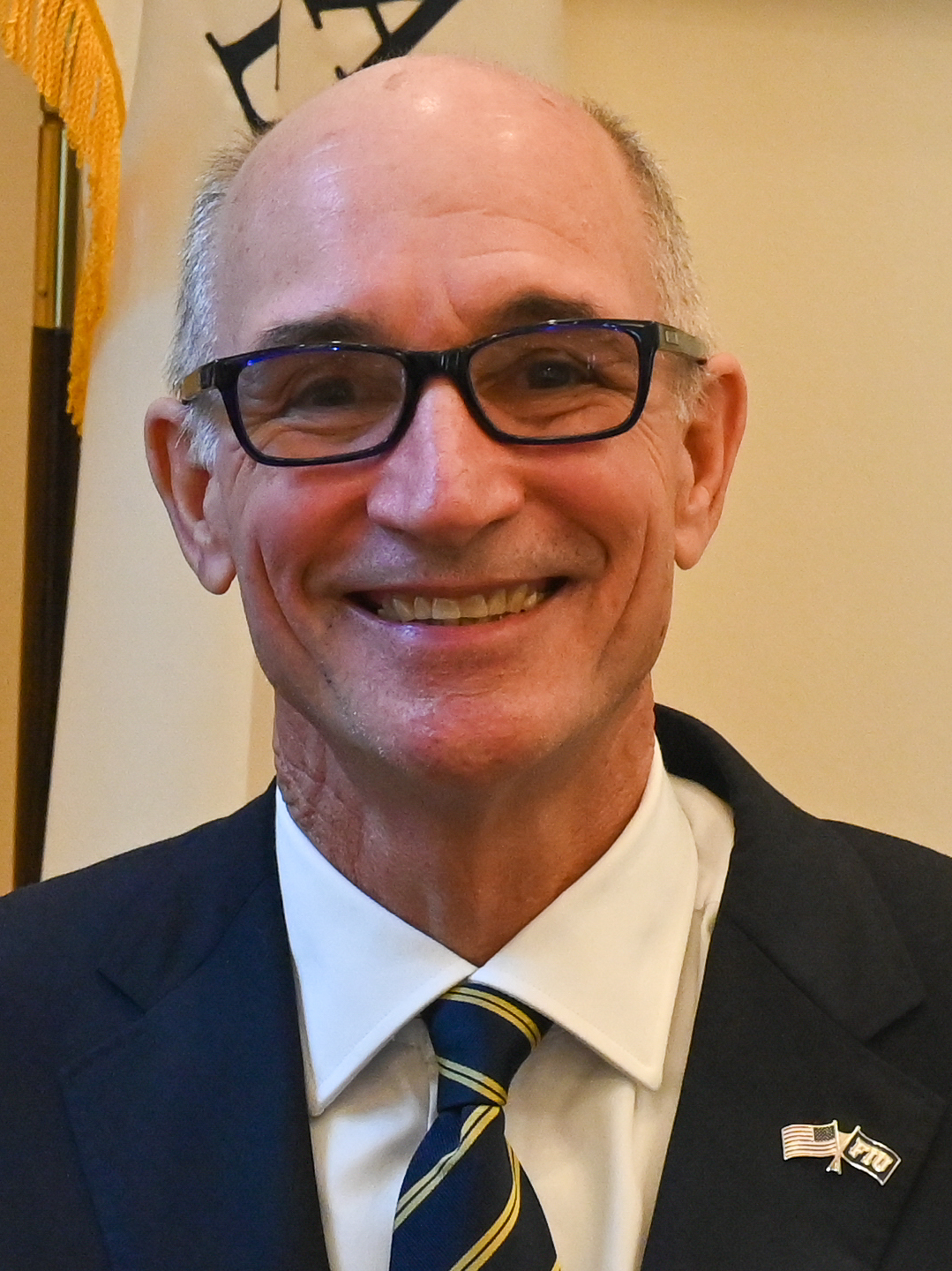

6th President of Florida International University
- In office January 21, 2022 – February 17, 2025
- Preceded by: Mark B. Rosenberg
- Succeeded by: Jeanette Nuñez

Personal details
- Born: July 10, 1955 (age 71) Fort Lauderdale, Florida, U.S.
- Spouse: Lori Jessell
- Education: Florida State University (BA, MBA, PhD)

Kenneth Arthur Jessell (born July 10, 1955) is an American educator, university administrator, and professor who was the sixth president of Florida International University. He succeeded Mark B. Rosenberg as president in January 2022, following Rosenberg's resignation amidst allegations of sexual harassment. Jeanette Nuñez succeeded him as president in February 2025.

== Education and career ==
Jessell received his Bachelor of Arts in political science from Florida State University. He also holds a Master of Business Administration degree and a Doctor of Philosophy degree in finance from FSU.

Prior to becoming president, Jessell had served as the senior vice president for finance and administration and chief financial officer at FIU since 2009. He is also a professor of finance at the Florida International University College of Business.

=== President of FIU ===
Jessell agreed to a three-year contract and an annual base salary of $650,000 as president of Florida International University and a performance-based bonus of $175,000, with his total compensation package coming out to $996,081, and was approved by the FIU Board of Trustees on October 17, 2022. He was confirmed as president by the Florida Board of Governors on November 9, 2022. His three year contract was set to end in 2025. He was replaced by Florida's lieutenant governor and FIU alumna Jeanette Nuñez as interim president on February 17, 2025.

== Personal life ==
Jessell is a native South Floridian and he and his wife Lori reside in Lauderdale-by-the-Sea, Florida, and have two adult children, Amanda and John, and a grandson James.

Academic offices
Preceded by Mark B. Rosenberg	President of Florida International University; 2022–2025	Succeeded by Jeanette Nuñez
