= University of Florida College of Engineering =

Engineering college in Gainesville, Florida

Herbert Wertheim College of Engineering
- Type: Public engineering school
- Established: 1910
- Parent institution: University of Florida
- Dean: Mark Tehranipoor
- Faculty: 438
- Undergraduates: 5,800
- Postgraduates: 2,500
- Location: Gainesville, Florida, United States; 29°38′54.3″N 82°20′54.5″W
- Website: www.eng.ufl.edu

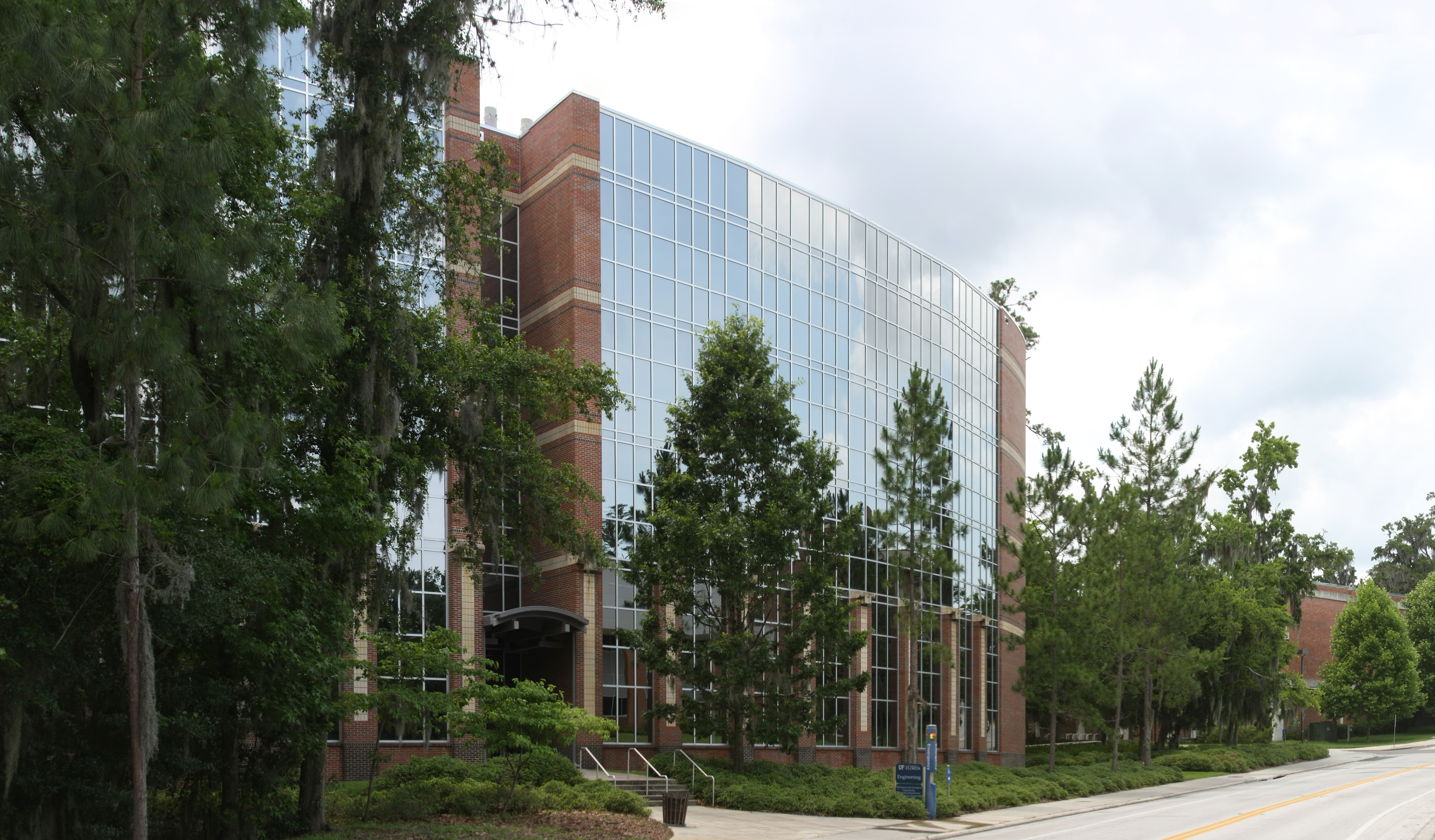
New Engineering Building

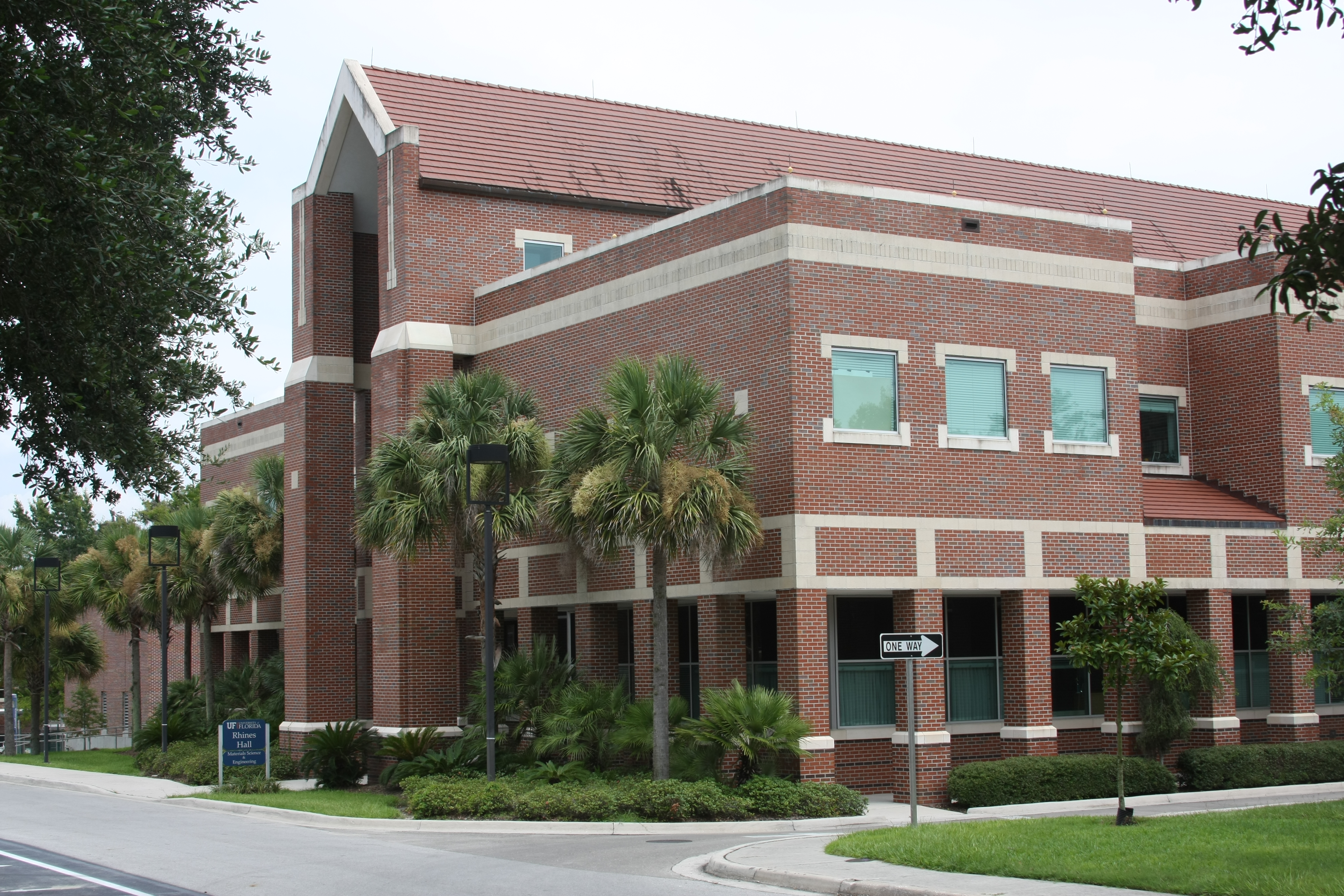
Rhines Hall

The Herbert Wertheim College of Engineering is the engineering school of the University of Florida. It is named after its alumnus, Herbert Wertheim.

== Schools and departments ==
- Engineering School of Sustainable Infrastructure & Environment
- Department of Agricultural & Biological Engineering
- J. Crayton Pruitt Family Department of Biomedical Engineering
- Department of Chemical Engineering
- Department of Computer & Information Science & Engineering
- Department of Engineering Education
- Department of Electrical & Computer Engineering
- Department of Industrial & Systems Engineering
- Department of Materials Science & Engineering
- Department of Mechanical & Aerospace Engineering

== Academics ==
The University of Florida College of Engineering was awarded $130.7 million in annual research expenditures in sponsored research for 2024.

=== Rankings ===
Graduate rankings according to U.S. News & World Report (2020 edition):

Department	Ranking
Overall College of Engineering	46th overall in the United States
Biological/Agricultural Engineering	8th overall

Undergraduate Ranking according to U.S. News & World Report (2021 edition):

- 32nd overall by the U.S. News & World Report, 2021
  - 7th for Biological/Agricultural Engineering
  - 48th for Computer Science
