= Bohemia Rag =

1919 rag by Joseph Lamb

- Rag by Joseph Lamb
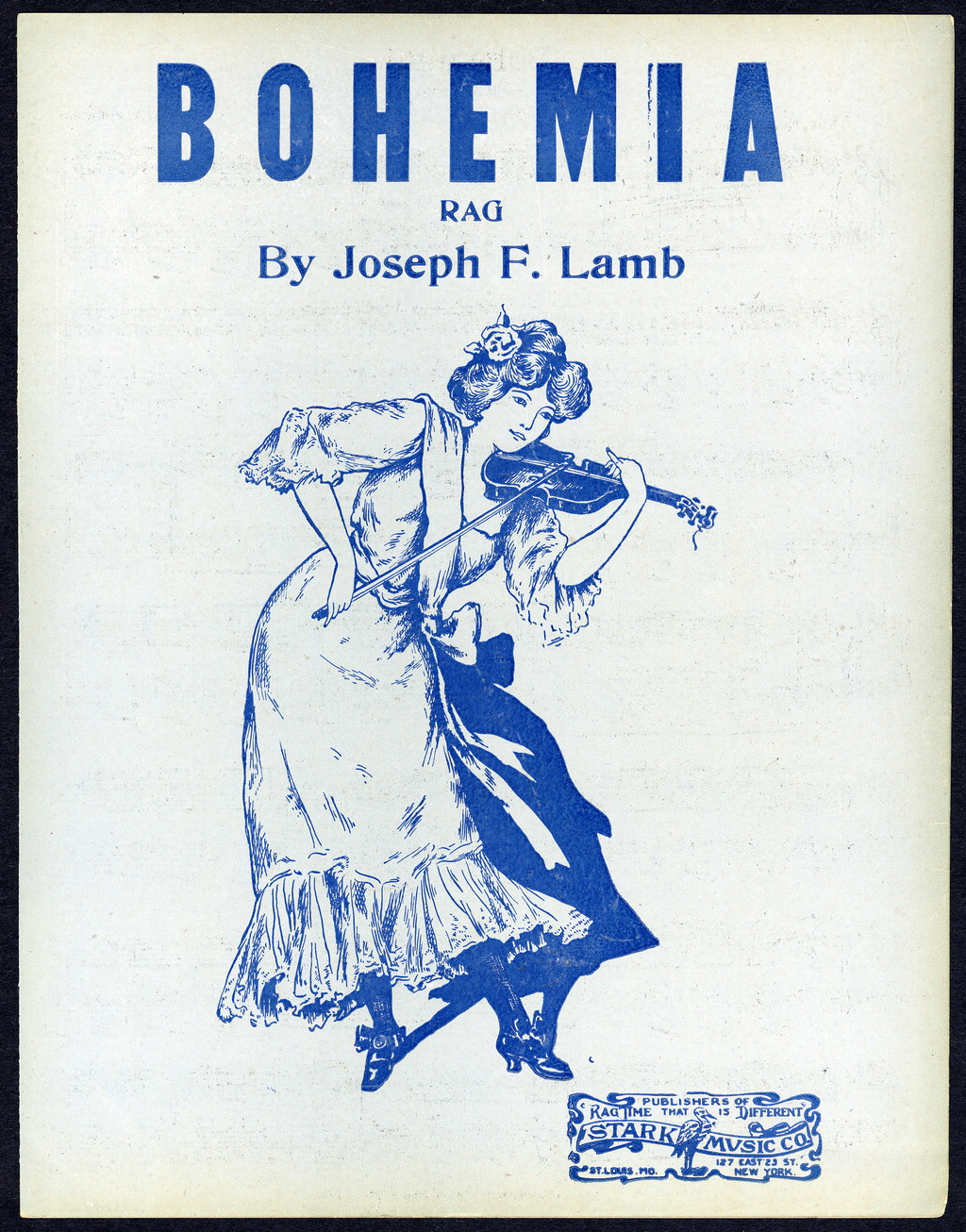
- Cover of the score
- Key: G major
- Year: 1919
- Published: 1919 - St. Louis
- Publisher: Stark Music Co.
- Duration: 4 minutes approximately
- Movements: 1
- Scoring: Solo piano

Bohemia Rag, also known as Bohemia, is a 1919 rag for solo piano by American composer Joseph Lamb. It is the composer's last published rag.

== Background ==
Lamb's Bohemia Rag was written at the end of the most prolific period of Lamb’s career. After meeting Scott Joplin in 1907, he was introduced to John Stillwell Stark, a music publisher best known for promoting ragtime music. Between 1909 and 1919, Lamb composed a number of rags while also working as an accountant for the textile firm L. F. Dommerich & Co., a position he held until his retirement in 1957. Bohemia was copyrighted in February 17, 1919 and was published that same year by Stark Music Co. in St. Louis. However, the score listed New York as the place of publication, likely to appeal to the local market, as Lamb was living there at the time. After finishing this piece, two major developments contributed to his withdrawal from professional composition and only composing as a hobby. First, ragtime fell out of fashion as jazz emerged and gained prominence in the early 1920s. Second, Lamb's wife, Henrietta Schultz, passed away on February 20, 1920 during the influenza epidemic. Even though Lamb remarried just two years later, he rejected early jazz and was sidelined, gradually withdrawing from the music publishing world as Stark had also moved from New York to St. Louis some years prior. As a result, Bohemia became his last published composition.

== Structure ==
This rag is scored for solo piano and in the key of G major, even though the main theme moves through several different keys, and the piece ends in C major. Its total duration is around four minutes and 156 bars, including repeats. It is in a constant 2/4 meter. It is marked “Not fast” in the score, with no further tempo changes. Dynamic changes are also uncommon and range from mp to ff. The structure of the piece is as follows:

Structure of Lamb's Bohemia Rag
Section		Bars	Key	Dynamics
Introduction		4	G major	f
Section A		16	G major	mf
Section A (Repeat)		16	G major	mf
Section B		16	G major	f
Section B (Repeat)		16	G major	f
Section A (Repeat)		16	G major	mf
Trio	Section C	16	C major	mp
Trio	Interlude	12	C major	mf
Trio	Section C (repeat)	16	C major	ff
Trio	Interlude (repeat)	12	C major	mf
Trio	Section C (repeat)	16	C major	ff

The use of tonality in this composition is unusual for Lamb. The key of G major does not emerge clearly until the thirteenth bar of Section A. The introduction is centred on E minor through the use of accidentals, and from that point the main theme moves through A minor, G major, and E minor before finally settling in G major. An ad libitum ossia passage appears in Section B, beginning with the left hand playing octaves.

Lamb described this piece as a “light rag,” a term he used for compositions that were technically and harmonically less complex and more closely associated with the cakewalk tradition. The use of an interlude to introduce the repeat of Section C is a characteristic feature of cakewalk forms, a device that Scott Joplin also employed in Eugenia (1906).

== Recordings ==
The following is a list of recordings of the piece:

Recordings of Lamb's Bohemia Rag
Piano	Date of recording	Place of recording	Label	Notes
Joshua Rifkin	August 1990	St. George's Church, Bristol, England, UK	Decca	

== Reception ==
Musicologists David Janes and Trebor Tichenor described the rag as "thoroughly delightful".
