= American Beauty Rag =

1913 rag by Joseph Lamb

- Rag by Joseph Lamb
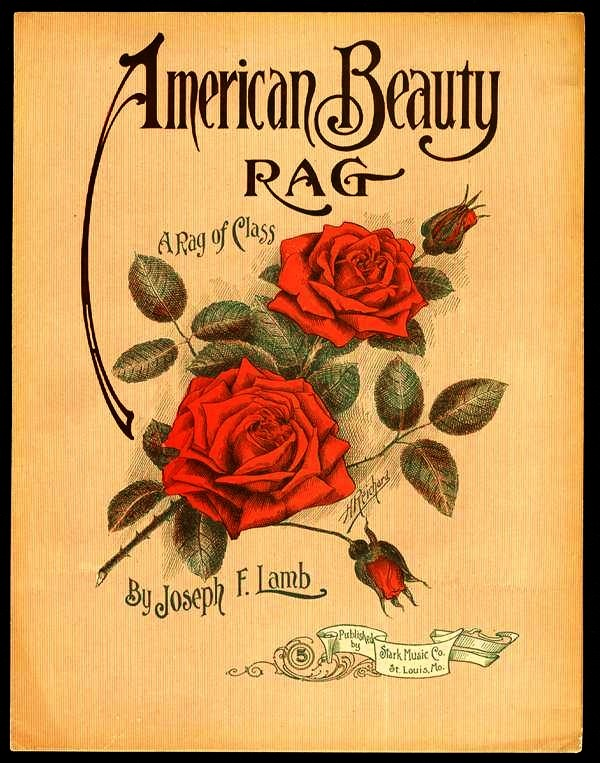
- Cover of the original score
- Key: E♭ major
- Year: 1913
- Time: 2/4
- Published: 1913 - St. Louis
- Publisher: Stark Music Co.
- Duration: 4 minutes approximately
- Movements: 1
- Scoring: Solo piano

American Beauty Rag is a 1913 rag for solo piano by American composer Joseph Lamb.

== Background ==
American Beauty Rag was written in one of Lamb's most prolific years, following his meeting with ragtime composer Scott Joplin in 1909. After meeting, Joplin introduced Lamb to John Stillwell Stark, a well-known ragtime publisher and champion. Stark published the rag in 1913 under his own publishing house, Stark Music Co., in St Louis, Missouri. The published version carried a subtitle reading "A rag of class", even though it was omitted in later reprints. The piece was copyrighted on December 27 of that year. Even though, as most other rags from its era, American Beauty Rag was not formally premiered, Lamb considered it was one of his best rags, along with Topliner Rag (1916) and Patricia Rag (1916). The piece was also released in piano roll format.

== Structure ==
The composition is around four minutes long. It is scored for solo piano and has a total of 148 bars, including repeats. It is marked "Slow march tempo" at the beginning of the piece and features no further tempo changes. It is in a stable 2/4. It is in the key of E♭ major, even though major key changes occur throughout the piece. According to musicologist John Edward Hesse, Lamb's melodic invention was "somewhat limited", even though he also "contribute[d] to some of the most powerful ragtime composition in the field" and "made more use of the full register of the piano's register than any other significant ragtime composer." The piece is structured as follows:

- Section A, in E♭ major, where the main theme is presented mf.
- Section A, repeated with an alternate ending leading into the next section.
- Section B, also in E♭ major. The second theme is presented f. Accents on the left hand are used much more prominently.
- Section B, repeated with an alternate ending while otherwise remaining unchanged.
- Section A. The opening section returns once more, marked mf.
- Transition, set in E♭ major as the dominant of the next key, A♭ major. Played f, the four-bar function as a bridge to the next section.
- Section C, in A♭ major. It begins with a fz, before quickly settling into mp. The third theme is presented.
- Section C, repeated, leading into the next section.
- Section D, also in A♭ major. A dialogue between different registers of the piano, with the contrasting voices marked f and mf so the listener can tell them apart easily.
- Section D, repeated, which closes the piece.

The composer himself described it as a “heavy” rag, a term he used for works with richer and more advanced harmonies. In this case, Lamb combined elements of the harmonic styles of Joplin and Scott, resulting in more complex fingerings and more challenging passages to play. This is in contrast to “light” rags, which tend to be more straightforward and closer in style to the traditional cakewalk.

== Recordings ==
The following is a list of recordings of the piece:

Recordings of Joseph Lamb's American Beauty Rag
Piano	Date of recording	Place of recording	Label	Notes
Joshua Rifkin	August 1990	St. George's Church, Bristol, England, UK	Decca	
Morten Gunnar Larsen	March 1998	Potton Hall, Dunwich, Suffolk, England, UK	Decca	
Richard Dowling	August 2000	Wertheim Performing Arts Center Concert Hall, Florida International University, Miami, Florida, USA	Klavier	
