= Jeanette Nuñez =

President of FIU since 2025

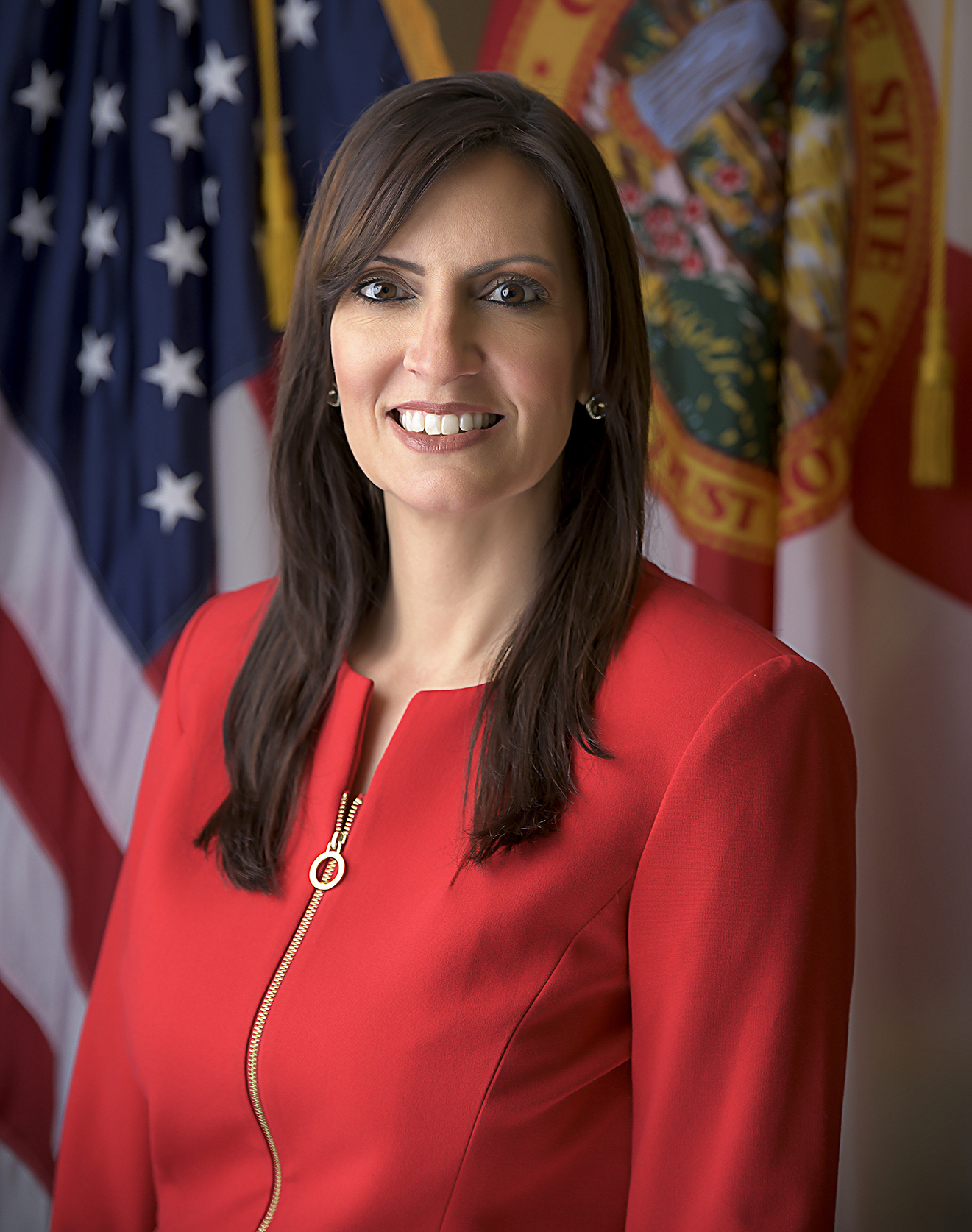
- Official portrait, 2019

7th President of Florida International University
- Incumbent
- Assumed office February 17, 2025 (Note: Acting: February 17, 2025 – June 18, 2025)
- Preceded by: Kenneth A. Jessell

20th Lieutenant Governor of Florida
- In office January 8, 2019 – February 16, 2025
- Governor: Ron DeSantis
- Preceded by: Carlos Lopez-Cantera
- Succeeded by: Jay Collins

Speaker pro tempore of the Florida House of Representatives
- In office November 22, 2016 – November 20, 2018
- Preceded by: Matt Hudson
- Succeeded by: MaryLynn Magar

Member of the Florida House of Representatives
- In office November 2, 2010 – November 6, 2018
- Preceded by: David Rivera
- Succeeded by: Juan Fernandez-Barquin
- Constituency: 112th district (2010–2012); 119th district (2012–2018)

Personal details
- Born: Jeanette Marie Sánchez; June 6, 1972 (age 54) Miami, Florida, U.S.
- Party: Republican
- Spouse: Adrian Nuñez (m. 1997)
- Children: 3
- Education: Florida International University (BA, MPA)

Jeanette Marie Nuñez (née Sánchez; born June 6, 1972) is an American university administrator and politician who currently serves as the president of Florida International University. Nuñez previously served as the 20th lieutenant governor of Florida from 2019 to 2025. A member of the Republican Party, she represented Miami-Dade County in the Florida House of Representatives from 2010 to 2018, also serving as speaker pro tempore for her last two years in the office. Nuñez is the first Hispanic American woman to serve as Florida's lieutenant governor.

On February 16, 2025, Nuñez resigned as lieutenant governor to become interim president of Florida International University (FIU). In June 2025, she was confirmed as the seventh FIU president, and the first ever woman to hold the position.

== Early life and education ==
Nuñez was born in Miami to Cuban parents Victor C. and Teresa Sánchez as one of their three daughters. In 1994, she earned a BA in political science and international relations from Florida International University (FIU). In 1998, Nuñez completed her Master of Public Administration at FIU.

== Career ==
Nuñez's first job was as an aide to state senator Alex Diaz de la Portilla. Later, Nuñez became vice president of government affairs at Jackson Health System. She became an adjunct professor and advisor at Florida International University. She served as vice president of external affairs at Kendall Regional Medical Center and Aventura Hospital & Medical Center. She became Lieutenant Governor of Florida.

=== Florida House of Representatives ===
When incumbent state representative David Rivera could not seek reelection in 2010 due to term limits, Nuñez ran to succeed him in the 112th district, which included parts of Broward, Collier, and Miami-Dade Counties, stretching from Doral to Naples. She faced Juan D'Arce and James Patrick Guerrero in the Republican primary, and promised to pass legislation to "improve the economy" and "reform the Medicaid program in order to contain the ever-growing costs that affect taxpayers." Nuñez won the primary, receiving 66% of the vote to D'Arce's 19% and Guerrero's 15%.

In the general election, she faced Democratic nominee Sandra Ruiz, a Doral City councilwoman, and Robert Van Name, an independent candidate. Nuñez campaigned on job creation, saying, "For me, the most important issue for District 112 and in fact for the entire state of Florida is creating jobs, improving the economy and lowering the tax burden for businesses and property owners." The Naples Daily News wrote, "If there is a textbook reason for redistricting reform, this race...would be it" and opined that "there is little sense of Collier connection from either Miami-based candidate", but endorsed Nuñez because she met with the editorial board and Ruiz did not, which it called "a dreadful measuring stick for picking such a high-ranking public servant". Nuñez won the election with 56% of the vote to Ruiz's 39% and Van Name's 5%.

When the state's legislative districts were redrawn in 2012, Nuñez was drawn into the 119th district, where she opted to seek reelection. She was challenged in the Republican primary by Libby Perez, but won renomination with 73% of the vote. In the general election, Nuñez only faced write-in opposition and won easily.

During the 2014 legislative session, Nuñez worked with state senator Jack Latvala to sponsor legislation that "would allow the children of undocumented immigrants to pay the same in-state tuition rates for college as other Floridians," which was passed by the legislature.

As reported by The Hill in 2018, Nuñez introduced legislation in Florida "to standardize daylight saving time for the entire calendar year". To make the "Sunshine Protection Act" nationwide, Senator Marco Rubio sponsored a bill in the Senate, because the state bill could not take effect until the federal government made the change. That was because the "provision would shift the state into a different time zone permanently", something which requires a federal regulatory action or an act of Congress.

=== Lieutenant Governor of Florida ===
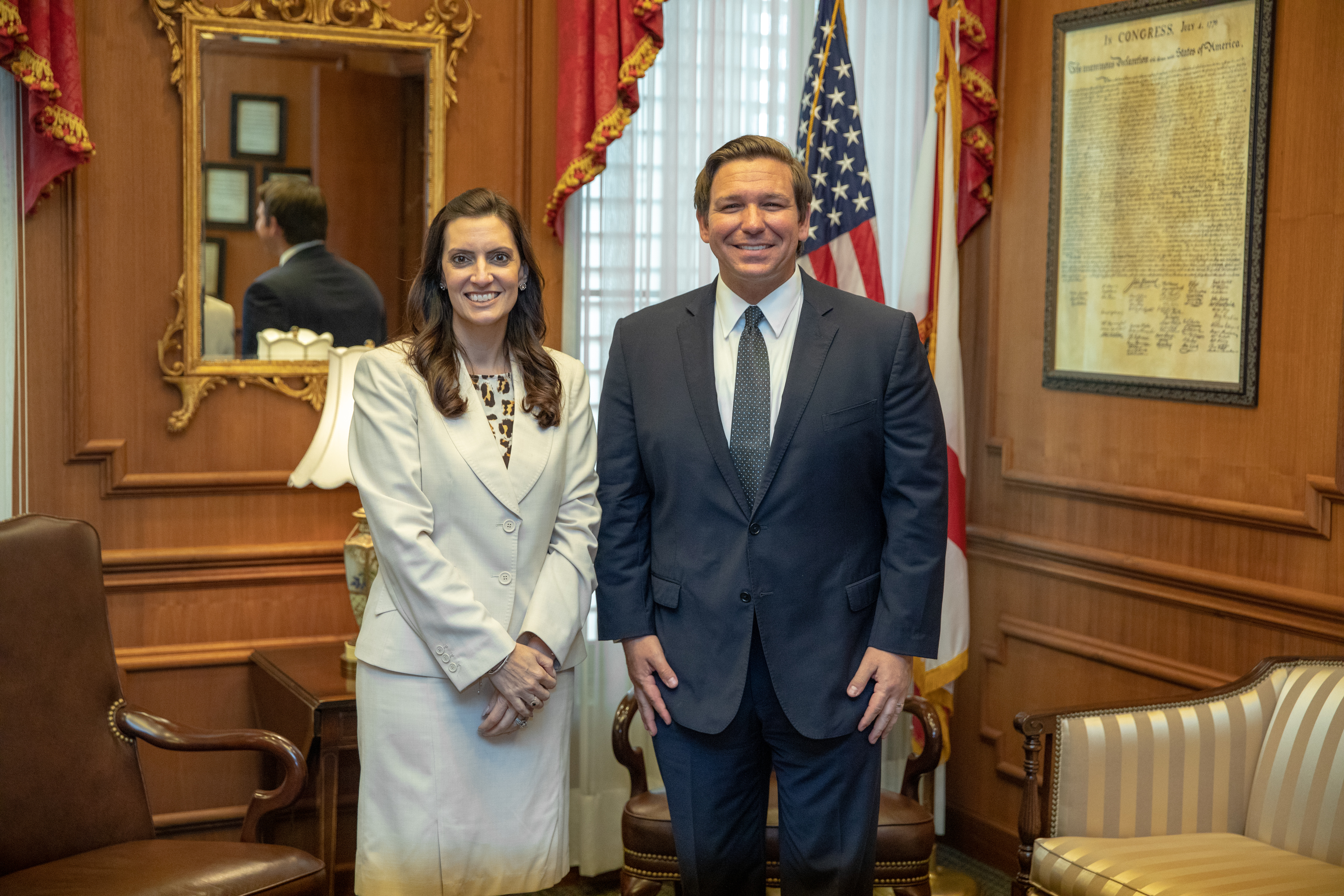
DeSantis and Nuñez, 2019

==== Selection ====
On September 5, 2018, Representative Ron DeSantis selected Nuñez to be his running mate in the 2018 Florida gubernatorial election, facing off against Andrew Gillum and his running mate Chris King. DeSantis and Nuñez would go on to win the election by a margin of less than half of a percentage point. Nuñez is the first Latina woman to serve as lieutenant governor of Florida.

In 2022 DeSantis and Nuñez were reelected with 59.4% of the vote, representing a more than 1.6 million vote margin over Charlie Crist. It was the largest margin of any Republican ever elected governor of Florida and included wins in Miami-Dade for a Republican gubernatorial candidate the first time since 2002, as well as other counties that had similarly voted for Democrats even longer.

==== Tenure ====
Nuñez was sworn in as lieutenant governor on January 8, 2019, succeeding Carlos Lopez-Cantera. During her time in office, she hosted various roundtables and events in support of exiles from Venezuela.

In February 2025, Nuñez resigned as lieutenant governor to be appointed as interim president of Florida International University.

=== Florida International University ===
On February 17, 2025, Nuñez was appointed as the interim president of Florida International University by DeSantis. In June 2025, she was confirmed as the seventh president of FIU.

== Personal life ==
Jeanette Nuñez married Adrian Nuñez in 1997. They have three children. Nuñez is Roman Catholic.

== See also ==
- List of minority governors and lieutenant governors in the United States

== Notes ==
Florida House of Representatives
Preceded by Tim Stubson	Speaker pro tempore of the Florida House of Representatives; 2016–2018	Succeeded by MaryLynn Magar
Party political offices
Preceded by Carlos Lopez-Cantera	Republican nominee for Lieutenant Governor of Florida; 2018, 2022	Succeeded by Bryan Avila
Political offices
Preceded by Carlos Lopez-Cantera	Lieutenant Governor of Florida; 2019–2025	Succeeded by Jay Collins
Academic offices
Preceded by Kenneth A. Jessell	President of Florida International University; 2025–present	Incumbent
