= Mark B. Rosenberg =

American academic administrator

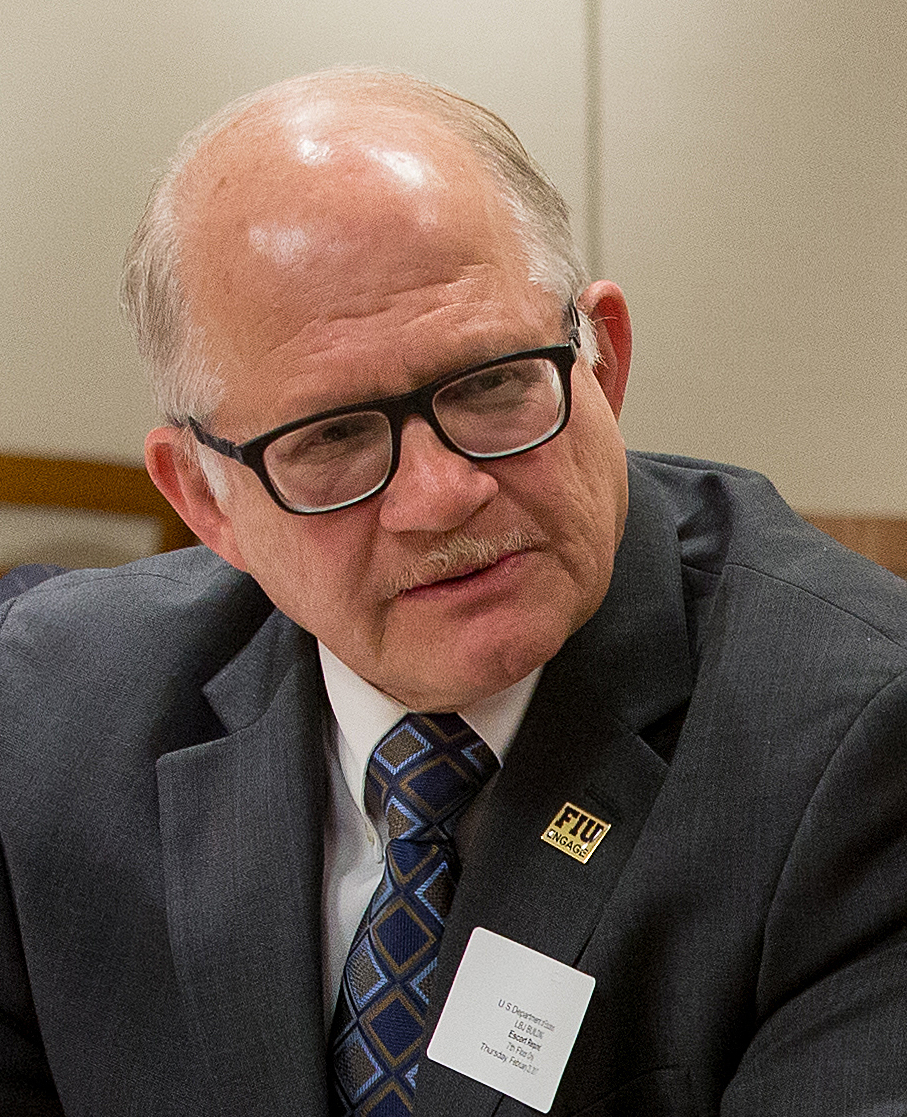

5th President of Florida International University
- In office August 28, 2009 – January 21, 2022
- Preceded by: Modesto A. Maidique
- Succeeded by: Kenneth A. Jessell

9th Chancellor of the State University System of Florida
- In office November 2005 – February 2009
- Preceded by: Debra D. Austin
- Succeeded by: John Delaney (interim); Frank Brogan

Personal details
- Born: August 15, 1949 (age 77)
- Spouse: Rosalie Rosenberg
- Children: 2
- Education: Miami University (BA); University of Pittsburgh (MA, PhD)
- Profession: Educator

Mark B. Rosenberg (born August 15, 1949) is an American professor and former university administrator who served as the fifth president of Florida International University from August 2009 until January 2022 and former Chancellor of the State University System of Florida. He is member of the Council on Foreign Relations think tank and has testified before the United States Congress numerous times. He also served as a consultant to the U.S. Department of State and the U.S. Agency for International Development.

== Early life ==
Rosenberg earned a Bachelor of Arts degree in political science with Omicron Delta Kappa honors in 1971 from Miami University in Ohio. He earned his Master of Arts in political science in 1971 and a Ph.D. in political science with a graduate certificate in Latin American and Caribbean Studies in 1976 from the University of Pittsburgh.

== Career ==
Rosenberg's academic career began at FIU in 1976 as an assistant professor of political science. In 1979, he founded the FIU Latin American and Caribbean Center, a National Center on Latin America, designated by the US Department of Education, funded by Title VI, recognizing it as one of the top Latin American and Caribbean Centers in the country. Rosenberg subsequently served as the Founding Dean of the College of Urban and Public Affairs and Vice Provost for International Studies. He has also been a Visiting Distinguished Research Professor at The Peabody College of Vanderbilt University, and a visiting professor at the Instituto Tecnologico de Monterrey (ITESM) in Mexico.

Rosenberg resigned as president of Florida International University effective January 21, 2022. Media reports stated that his resignation followed complaints that his interactions with a female employee had caused discomfort, prompting an internal investigation.

An independent investigation commissioned by the university later concluded that there was no evidence that Rosenberg’s conduct constituted sexual harassment, though the report found that both engaged in inappropriate informal contact.

Following his resignation as president, Rosenberg continued his academic affiliation with Florida International University as a faculty member. He was succeeded by Kenneth A. Jessell, previously FIU's Chief Financial Officer and Senior Vice President for Finance and Administration.

== See also ==
Academic offices
| Preceded by Modesto Maidique | President of Florida International University; 2009–2022 | Succeeded by Kenneth A. Jessell |
| Preceded by Debra D. Austin | 9th Chancellor of the State University System of Florida; 2005–2009 | Succeeded by John Delaney |
