= Debra D. Austin =

American academic

Debra Austin
- Education: University of Florida; Florida State University; Michigan State University
- Occupations: Professor at FSU; Former Chancellor

Debra Dabney Austin is a professor at Florida State University, and she served as chancellor of the State University System of Florida from 2003 to 2005.

Austin is originally from Michigan. She earned a bachelor's degree in English from Michigan State University, and a master's degree in English from the University of Florida. She received her master's in business administration and a doctorate in higher education administration from Florida State University. Prior to becoming chancellor, Austin served as assistant vice president for academic affairs at Florida State University.

Academic offices
| Preceded by Judy Hample | 8th Chancellor of the State University System of Florida; 2003–2005 | Succeeded by Mark B. Rosenberg |
