= Modesto Maidique =

Modesto A. Maidique
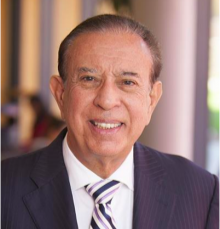
- Modesto Maidique in early 2020s

4th President of Florida International University
- In office 1986–2009
- Preceded by: Gregory Baker Wolfe
- Succeeded by: Mark B. Rosenberg

Personal details
- Born: March 20, 1940 (age 86) Havana, Cuba
- Party: Republican
- Education: Massachusetts Institute of Technology (BS, MS, PhD)
- Occupation: Administrator; Engineer

Modesto Alex "Mitch" Maidique (pronounced /maɪdiːkɛ/; born March 20, 1940) is a Cuban-American electrical engineer, businessman, and educator. He was the fourth president of Florida International University (FIU), a public university in the United States, whose main campus is named after him. On November 14, 2008, Maidique presented his resignation to the FIU Board of trustees. On April 25, 2009, Mark B. Rosenberg was chosen to succeed Maidique and assumed office on August 3, 2009.

== President of FIU ==
Modesto Maidique was president of FIU for 23 years. During his tenure, the Colleges of Law and Engineering and a School of Architecture were established. The FIU College of Medicine was also founded in 2006. The first class of medical students began their studies in August 2009.

In 2006, Maidique had a dispute with long-time University supporter Herbert Wertheim over the naming of the medical school building, which resulted in the revocation of a $20 million donation. Wertheim had initially offered to donate the funds to have the medical facility named in his honor. However, Wertheim wanted to pay the donation over a period of months, and Maidique insisted that it would have to be paid in a lump sum in order for the school to get crucial matching funds from the state. During discussions of the matter, Maidique told Wertheim that he was getting the naming rights "on the cheap", and that they were really worth $100 million, prompting Wertheim to withdraw his offer.

On November 14, 2008, Maidique announced his resignation from his post as President of FIU. On June 12, 2009, FIU's board of trustees voted to rename the University Park campus to the Modesto A. Maidique Campus.

== Professional background ==
Maidique was born in Havana, Cuba on March 20, 1940.

In 1989, US President George H. W. Bush appointed him to the President’s Educational Policy Advisory Committee, and he served in a similar capacity for President George W. Bush. Maidique was a member of the Presidential Scholars Commission.

An article he co-authored, "The Art of High Technology Management" was published in the Sloan Management Review.

== Personal ==
Maidique earned a Bachelor of Science (1962), Master of Science (1964), and Doctor of Philosophy (1970) in electrical engineering from the Massachusetts Institute of Technology.

Preceded by Gregory Baker Wolfe	President of Florida International University; 1986 - 2009	Succeeded by Mark B. Rosenberg
