= FIU Herbert Wertheim College of Medicine =

Medical school of Florida International University

Coordinates: 25.75816°N 80.37132°W

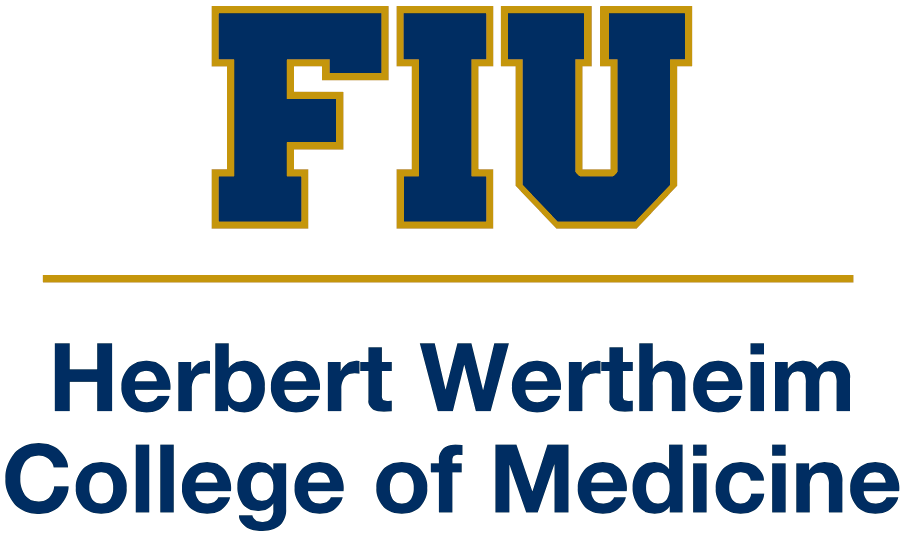
- Type: Public
- Established: 2006
- Dean: Juan C. Cendan
- Students: 493 (2022)
- Location: Miami, Florida, U.S.
- Website: medicine.fiu.edu

The Herbert Wertheim College of Medicine is the medical school of Florida International University, located in Modesto A. Maidique Campus in unincorporated Miami-Dade County, Florida. The College of Medicine is one of the university's 26 schools and colleges. Degrees and programs offered at the College of Medicine include a Doctor of Medicine (MD), a Master in Physician Assistant, a Ph.D. in Biomedical Sciences, and a Graduate Certificate in Molecular and Biomedical Sciences.

The College of Medicine was founded by the Florida Board of Governors on March 23, 2006. Its inaugural class of 43 students entered in fall 2009 and was the first graduating class in 2013.

For Fall 2010, 3,606 students applied for 43 spots.

The College of Medicine received full accreditation from the Liaison Committee on Medical Education in February 2013.

== History ==
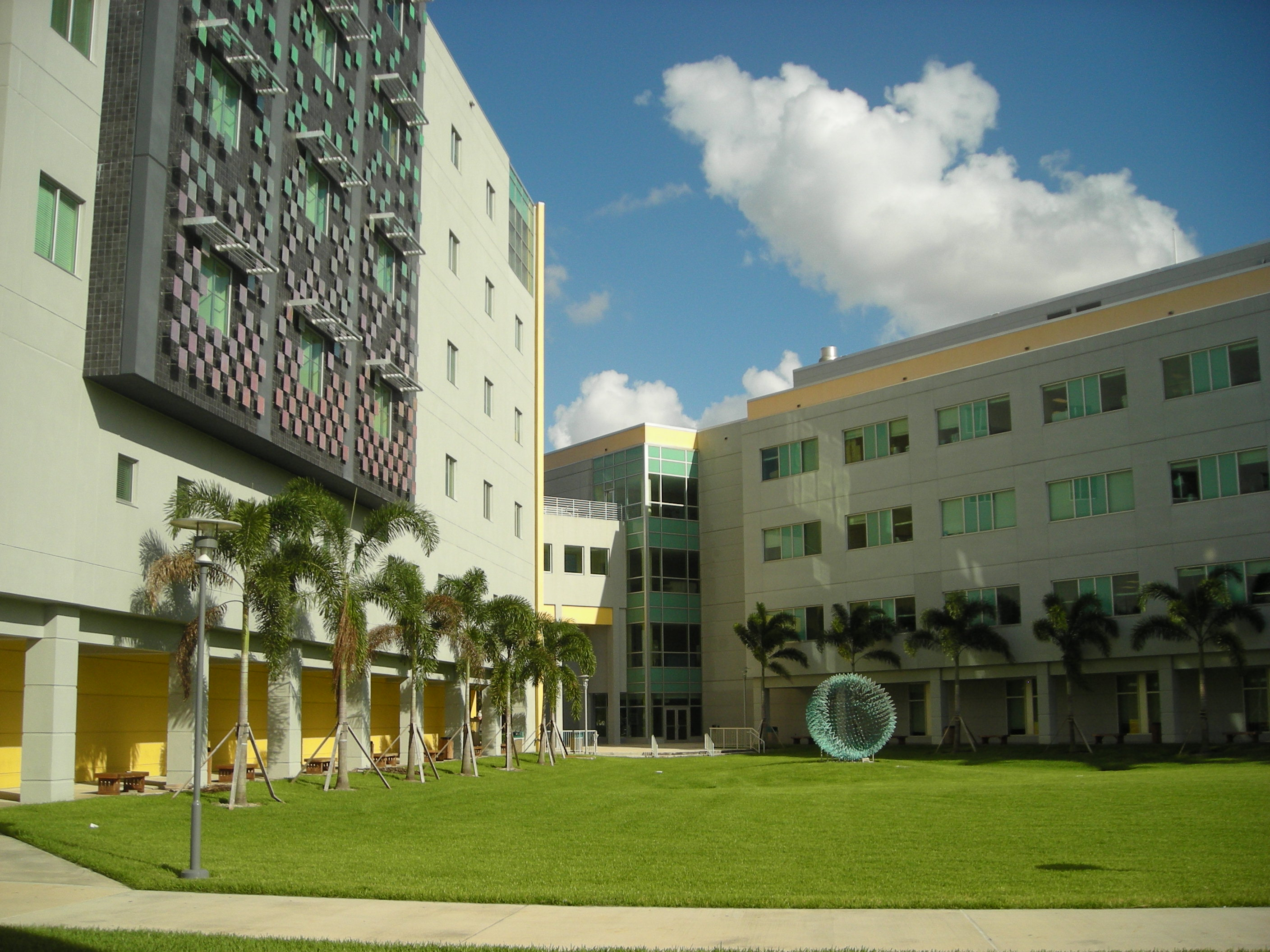
Health and Life Sciences Building I and II house the College of Medicine.

The College of Medicine was founded by the Florida Board of Governors on March 23, 2006. Its inaugural class of 43 students entered in fall 2009 and was the first graduating class in 2013.

On June 12, 2009, longtime FIU benefactor Herbert Wertheim announced that he and his wife Nicole Wertheim, would donate $20 million to the FIU College of Medicine through their Dr. Herbert and Nicole Wertheim Family Foundation, to be matched by state funds for a total of $40 million. Following this, the college was renamed in his honor. Funds from the donation will go to the establishment of the Dr. Herbert and Nicole Wertheim Endowments for Medical Education and Research and Dr. Herbert and Nicole Wertheim Medical Scholarship Endowment. Half of the endowment, which will be funded over the course of three years to 2012, will be set aside to support scholarships for College of Medicine students and other students pursuing advanced degrees in other scientific fields, such as engineering.

In April 2023, medical school dean Dr. Juan C. Cendan announced that the Wertheim College of Medicine is partnering with Baptist Health South Florida, the largest healthcare organization in the region, to form an academic healthcare system that would serve Miami-Dade and Broward counties.

On May 2, 2023, the Wertheim College of Medicine graduated its 11th class of medical students, including its 1000th MD.

== Administration ==
In 2022, Dr. Juan C. Cendan was appointed dean of the Herbert Wertheim College of Medicine and senior vice president for Health Affairs for Florida International University and spearheaded the partnership with Baptist Health. He’d been serving as interim dean since 2021. Dr. John A. Rock was the school’s founding dean and served from 2006-2018. He was succeeded by Dr. Robert Sackstein (2018-2021).

== Admissions ==
College of Medicine Admissions
	2025	2024	2023	2022	
Applicants	6,013	6,073	6,236	6,749	
Matriculated Students	121	120	121	120	This table does not count deferred applications or other unique situations.

In its inaugural 2009 class, the FIU College of Medicine received 3,247 applicants; 126 were admitted, and 43 were enrolled. The average undergraduate GPA was 3.7. Students of the Class of 2014 came from Alaska, California, Florida, Maryland, and Michigan. 84% of students were from Florida, and 54% were Miamians.

The Wertheim College of Medicine has a full capacity of 480 medical students—120 students per class. In 2023, the school received more than 6236 applications for the incoming class.

== Affiliations ==
FIU Herbert Wertheim College of Medicine has announced that it is finalizing a comprehensive alliance with Baptist Health South Florida that will expand undergraduate and graduate medical education programs, develop clinical and teaching facilities, grow faculty-physician practices, and deepen capabilities around research.

Currently, the college works in affiliation with a variety of clinical community partners, including Baptist Health South Florida, Broward Health, Citrus Health Network, Cleveland Clinic Foundation Florida, Jackson Health System, Memorial Health Care System (Hollywood), Mercy Hospital (Miami), Mount Sinai Medical Center (Miami), Miami VA Healthcare System, North Shore Medical Center, Westchester General Hospital, Palmetto General Hospital, Kendall Regional Medical Center, South Florida Evaluation and Treatment Center.
