= Joseph Lamb (composer) =

American composer of ragtime music (1887–1960)

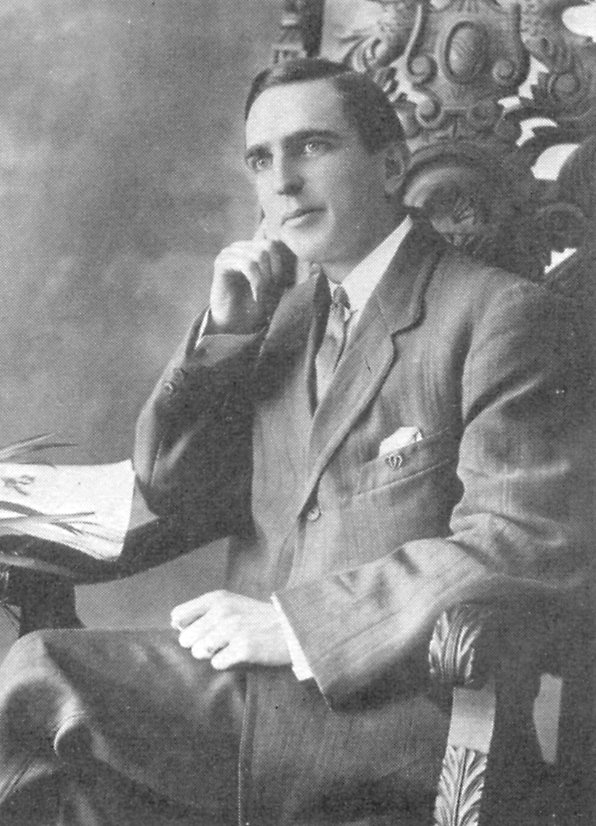
Joseph Lamb, ca. 1915

Joseph Francis Lamb (December 6, 1887 – September 3, 1960) was an American composer of ragtime music. Lamb, of Irish descent, was the only non-African American of the "Big Three" composers of classical ragtime, the other two being Scott Joplin and James Scott. The ragtime of Joseph Lamb ranges from standard popular fare to complex and highly engaging. His use of long phrases was influenced by classical works he had learned from his sister and others while growing up, but his sense of structure was potentially derived from his study of Joplin's piano rags. By the time he added some polish to his later works in the 1950s, Lamb had mastered the classic rag genre in a way that almost no other composer was able to approach at that time, and continued to play it passably as well, as evidenced by at least two separate recordings done in his home, as well as a few recorded interviews.

== Early life and education ==
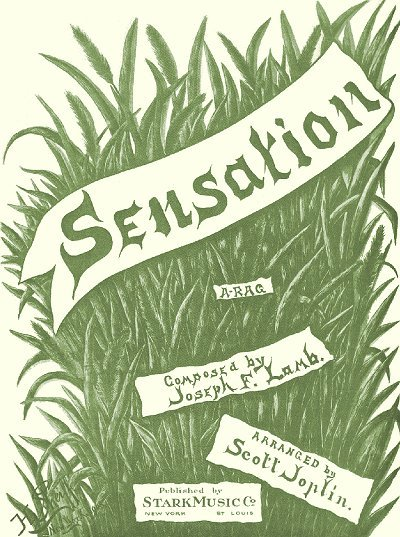
"Sensation", Joseph Lamb's first rag was published under John Stark's label.

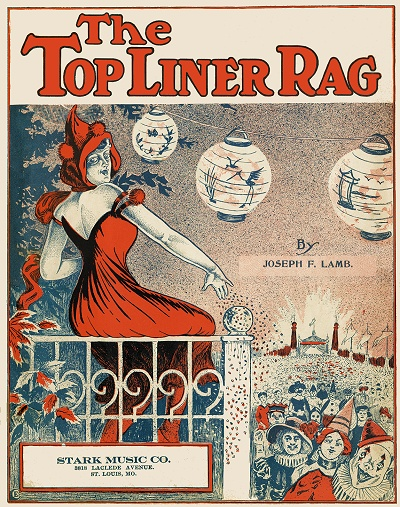
"The Top Liner Rag" from 1916

Lamb was born in Montclair, New Jersey. The youngest of four children, he taught himself to play the piano and admired the early ragtime publications of Scott Joplin. His first known works were "Meet Me at the Chutes," and "Idle Dreams", at the age of 13 in 1900, but they are unpublished and assumed lost.

While living in Toronto, Canada in his teenage years, he published several march and waltz compositions for Harry H. Sparks Music Publisher. Most notable were "The Lilliputian's Bazaar", "Celestine Waltzes", and "Florentine". Most were published after he left Canada.

== Career ==
Lamb dropped out of St. Jerome's College in 1904 to work for a dry goods company. He met Joplin in 1907 while purchasing the latest Joplin and Scott sheet music in the offices of John Stark & Son. Joplin was impressed with Lamb's compositions and recommended him to ragtime publisher John Stark. Stark published Lamb's music for the next decade, starting with "Sensation".

Lamb's twelve rags published by Stark from 1908 to 1919 can be divided into two groups. The "heavy" rags are incorporated with Joplin's melody–dominated style and Scott's expansive use of the keyboard registers. This style includes "Ethiopia Rag" (1909), "Excelsior Rag" (1909), "American Beauty Rag" (1913), "Nightingale Rag" (1915), and "Top Liner Rag" (1916). The "light" rags with the cakewalk tradition show the narrow-range melodies inspired by Joplin. This style of rags includes "Champagne Rag" (1910), "Cleopatra Rag" (1915), "Reindeer: Ragtime Two Step" (1915), and "Bohemia Rag" (1919). "Contentment Rag" (1915) and "Patricia Rag" (1916) have characteristics of both "heavy" and "light" rags.

Lamb used sequence for development purposes. He emphasized the harmonic sonority of the diminished seventh with upper-neighbor appoggiatura. He surpassed ragtime's usual four-measure phrase structure.

Lamb, Nightingale Rag
Performed by Constantin Stephan

In 1911, Lamb married his first wife, Henrietta Schultz, and moved to Brooklyn, New York. He worked as an arranger for the J. Fred Helf Music Publishing Company and later, starting in April 1914, as an accountant for L. F. Dommerich & Company. They had one son, Joseph Jr., together, in 1915. Henrietta died of influenza in 1920 about the same time that popular music interest shifted from ragtime to jazz. Lamb stopped publishing his music, playing and composing only as a hobby. "Bohemia Rag" was published in 1919.

Jack Mills, Inc. hired Lamb to write four novelty piano solos, (being "Cinders", "Shooting the Works", "Chime In", and "Crimson Rambler") in the early 1920s, but these were unpublished and lost until the 2010s.

== Personal life ==
Lamb married Amelia Collins in 1922. They had four children: Patricia (1924–2022), Richard (1926–?), Robert (1927–2023), and Donald (1930–2003).

With the revival of interest in ragtime in the 1950s, Lamb shared his memories of Joplin and other early ragtime figures with music historians. Many were surprised to find that not only was he still living but that he was white. He composed new rags, brought out compositions that had never been published, and made recordings. A year before his death in 1960 the album Joseph Lamb: A Study in Classic Ragtime was released by Folkways Records. He died of a heart attack in Brooklyn at age 72.

== Rags published by John Stark ==
- Sensation Rag (1908)
- Ethiopia Rag (1909)
- Excelsior Rag (1909)
- Champagne Rag (1910)
- American Beauty Rag (1913)
- Contentment Rag (1915)
- Ragtime Nightingale (1915)
- Cleopatra Rag (1915)
- Reindeer Rag (1915)
- Top Liner Rag (1916)
- Patricia Rag (1916)
- Bohemia Rag (1919)

Sensation Rag (1908)
MIDI file

== Additional rags (1959–1966) ==
- Alabama Rag
- Alaskan Rag
- Arctic Sunset
- Beehive Rag
- Bird Brain Rag
- Blue Grass Rag
- Chasin' the Chippies (1914)
- Chimes of Dixie
- Chime In
- Cinders
- Cottontail Rag
- Crimson Rambler
- Firefly Rag
- Good and Plenty Rag
- Greased Lightning (c. 1907)
- Hot Cinders
- Hyacinth - A Rag (1907)
- Jersey Rag
- Joe Lamb's Old Rag (c. 1908, originally titled "Dynamite Rag")
- The Old Home Rag
- Ragged Rapids Rag (1905)
- Ragtime Bobolink
- Ragtime Special (c. 1908)
- Rapid Transit (c. 1907)
- Ragtime Reverie
- Shootin' the Works
- Spanish Fly (1912)
- Thoroughbred Rag
- Toad Stool Rag
- Walper House Rag (1903)

== Other selected songs, waltzes, and marches ==
- Celestine Waltzes (1905)
- Doin' the Lonesome Slow Drag
- Don't You Be Lonely
- Florentine (1906)
- Florida (1905)
- Golden Leaves (1903)
- Gee, Kid! But I Like You (1908)
- I'd Like You to Love Me
- I'll Follow the Crowd to Coney (1913)
- Ilo-Ilo
- I'm Going to Somewhere
- I Want to Be a Birdman (1913)
- Joe Lamb's Medley Overture No.1 (1908)
- Joe Lamb's Medley Overture No. 2
- Le Premier (1903)
- The Lilliputian's Bazaar (1905)
- Lorne Scots on Parade (1904)
- Love In Absence (1909)
- Mignonne (1901)
- Muskoka Falls (1902)
- My Queen of Zanzibar (1904)
- Red Feather (1906)
- Since You Took My Heart Away
- Sourdough March (1906)
- 22nd Regiment March
