= Herbert Wertheim =

American businessman (born 1939)

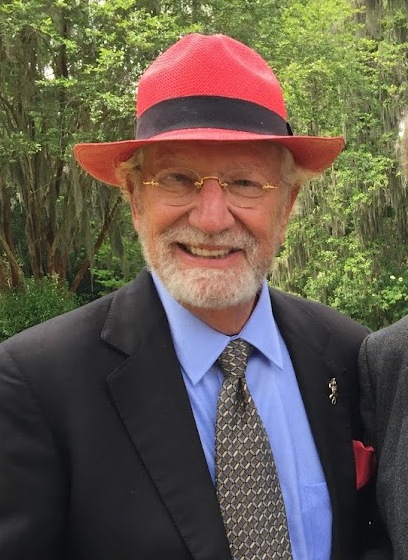
- Born: Herbert A. Wertheim; May 23, 1939 (age 87); Philadelphia, Pennsylvania, USA
- Education: Brevard Community College (attended); University of Florida (attended); Southern College of Optometry (BS, OD)
- Political party: Republican

Herbert A. Wertheim (born May 23, 1939) is an American optometrist, inventor, billionaire businessman, and philanthropist. He is the founder and president of Brain Power Incorporated (BPI).

Wertheim developed ultraviolet (UV) light-absorbing dyes for plastic ophthalmic lenses during the late 1960s. His work contributed to the widespread adoption of UV-protective eyeglass lenses and led to the founding of Brain Power Incorporated in 1970.

He and his then wife co-founded the Dr. Herbert and Nicole Wertheim Family Foundation in 1977. Wertheim serves as the Founding Chairman of the FIU Herbert Wertheim College of Medicine, as advisor to The Nicole Wertheim College of Nursing and Health Sciences at Florida International University, and as honorary chairman of The Herbert Wertheim College of Engineering at the University of Florida.

As of June 2026, his net worth is estimated at US$4.6 billion.

== Positions and affiliations ==
- Founding Chairman, Herbert Wertheim College of Medicine, Florida International University.
- Trustee Emeritus, Florida International University.
- Honorary Chairman, Herbert Wertheim College of Engineering, University of Florida.
- Founder and chairman, Brain Power Incorporated (BPI).
- Chairman, Dr. Herbert and Nicole Wertheim Family Foundation.
- Chairman, Global Foundation for Oceanographic and Atmospheric Research.

== Institutions named in his honor ==
Following major philanthropic gifts, several academic institutions, healthcare organizations, and research centers have been named in honor of Wertheim, including:

- Herbert Wertheim College of Medicine, Florida International University.
- Herbert Wertheim College of Engineering, University of Florida.
- Herbert Wertheim School of Public Health and Human Longevity Science, University of California, San Diego.
- Herbert Wertheim School of Optometry & Vision Science, University of California, Berkeley.
- Herbert Wertheim UF Scripps Institute for Biomedical Innovation & Technology, University of Florida.
- Nicole Wertheim College of Nursing & Health Sciences, Florida International University.
- Herbert and Nicole School of Music and the Performing Arts, Florida International University.
- Herbert Wertheim College of Business, Florida State University.
- Baptist Health Herbert Wertheim Cancer Institute, Baptist Health South Florida.

== Early life and education ==
Wertheim was born on May 23, 1939, in Philadelphia to Jewish parents. His father immigrated from Europe in 1907, while his mother was born in Brooklyn. In 1945, he and his family moved to Miami Beach, Florida. They later moved to an apartment above the family's bakery. He was diagnosed with dyslexia. At age 16, he faced a judge on truancy charges before enlisting in the United States Navy and being stationed in San Diego. He studied physics and chemistry in the Navy before working in naval aviation. It was here that he made his first investment, buying stock in the aviation company Learjet.

Wertheim is a graduate of Brevard Community College (now Eastern Florida State College). He studied electrical engineering at the University of Florida for a year, before receiving his B.S. in optical engineering and a Doctor of Optometry from the Southern College of Optometry. He has nine patents.

== Philanthropy ==
=== Baptist Health South Florida ===
In May 2026, Wertheim donated $100 million to Baptist Health South Florida, the largest single philanthropic gift in the organization's history. In recognition of the gift, Baptist Health Miami Cancer Institute was renamed the Baptist Health Herbert Wertheim Cancer Institute, and the Herbert Wertheim Cancer Institute Transformational Impact Fund was established to support cancer care, research, prevention, education, and clinical innovation.

A major component of the gift supports Baptist Health's academic partnership with the Herbert Wertheim College of Medicine at Florida International University (FIU). The funding is intended to expand physician training, graduate medical education, cancer research, and collaboration between clinicians, researchers, and medical students while supporting Baptist Health's efforts to obtain designation as a National Cancer Institute (NCI)-designated cancer center.

The donation builds upon the expanded academic affiliation established between Baptist Health and FIU in 2023. Under the partnership, Baptist Health serves as FIU's principal academic health system, supporting undergraduate and graduate medical education, physician residency and fellowship programs, clinical research, and the development of a new academic medical center on FIU's main campus.

=== Florida International University ===
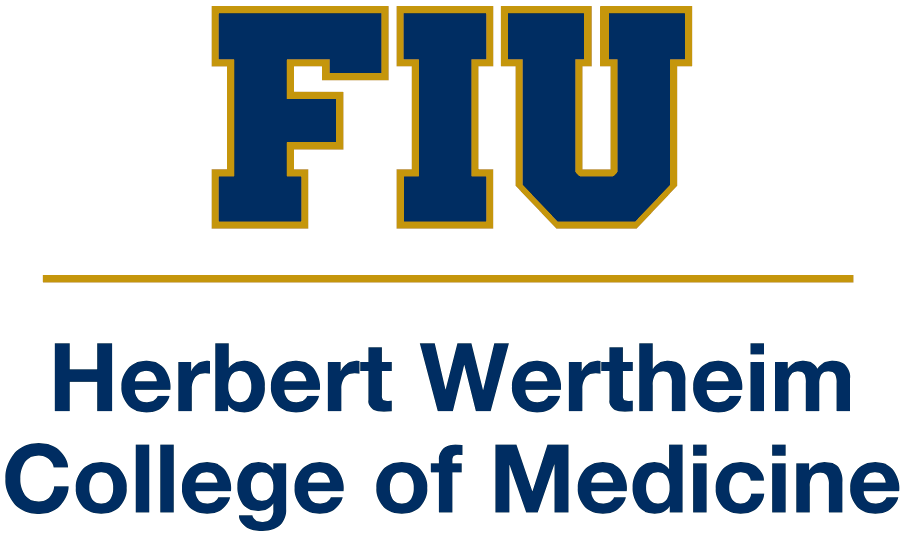
FIU College of Medicine Logo

In May 2009, the Dr. Herbert and Nicole Wertheim Family Foundation made a $20 million contribution which becomes $40 million with state matching funds to establish multiple endowments including eight endowed chairs for the Medical College. In June 2009, the FIU Board of Trustees named the new college the Herbert Wertheim College of Medicine in his honor and named him Founding Chairman of the College of Medicine and Trustee Emeritus of the university.

A 300-seat mainstage theatre at FIU was named the Herbert and Nicole Wertheim Performing Arts Center (WPAC). In September 2013, FIU named the Nicole Wertheim College of Nursing and Health Sciences in honor of Wertheim's wife Nicole.

=== Other universities ===
In October 2015, the University of Florida announced the naming of the Herbert Wertheim College of Engineering in honor of the Wertheim Family Foundation's gift of $50 million, which will, among other things, fund an 80,000 sq.ft. Engineering Innovation building and foster collaboration between the University of Florida and Florida International University. In October 2022, he donated $100 million to the University of Florida Health's Scripps Institute, and it was renamed The Herbert Wertheim UF Scripps Institute for Biomedical Innovation & Technology.

In 2018, the Herbert and Nicole Wertheim Family Foundation made a $25 million donation to the University of California, San Diego to establish a school of public health. As a result, The Herbert Wertheim School of Public Health and Human Longevity Science was founded in 2019.

In January 2022, the UC Berkeley School of Optometry was renamed the Herbert Wertheim School of Optometry and Vision Science in recognition of a gift of $50 million from Dr. Herbert Wertheim.

In December 2025, the Florida State University College of Business was renamed the Wertheim College of Business after a $65 million philanthropic investment from Wertheim.

== Political involvement ==
Herbert Wertheim paid $2 million for a private White House visit with President Donald Trump at a Mar-a-Lago gala in February 2026.

In April 2026, Herbert Wertheim announced his candidacy for Florida's 22nd congressional district as a Republican, intending to finance his campaign by loaning it $2.5 million. He later withdrew his candidacy.

== Awards and recognition ==
In April 2011, Wertheim was inducted into the Horatio Alger Association of Distinguished Americans in recognition of his achievements despite growing up in poverty.

The La Jolla Institute for Allergy and Immunology elected Wertheim to serve as a director and research advisor in July 2013.

In 2018, he was inducted into the Florida Inventors Hall of Fame for his pioneering inventions in ophthalmic lens technology and his contributions to vision science and entrepreneurship.

Wertheim has also received the Ellis Island Medal of Honor, which recognizes individuals whose accomplishments exemplify a commitment to community service while celebrating America's immigrant heritage.

He is a distinguished alumnus of the University of Florida, where he is a member of the Tau Beta Pi engineering honor society and received an honorary Doctor of Technology degree.

== Personal life ==
Wertheim has two children, Erica Wertheim Zohar and Vanessa Wertheim.

In July 2023, his wife of 55 years, Nicole Wertheim, filed for divorce. In addition, she sued him for forgery and misappropriation of funds. She was granted a divorce in April 2025. Nicole died suddenly on April 20, 2026, at age 82. She had been living full time on a residential cruise ship called The World where staff found that Wertheim had died in her shipboard residence. Her death took place the same night that she was being honored in Miami for her philanthropy by the charity focused online magazine Social Miami. Their daughter Erica Zohar accepted the award on behalf of her mother.

In June 2026, following Nicole Wertheim’s death, their daughter Erica Wertheim Zohar published an op-ed in the Los Angeles Times discussing the aftermath of her parents’ divorce and the way both University of Florida and University of California Berkeley refused to acknowledge her death and honor her, even though she was one of their largest donors.

Wertheim bought the first production Ferrari Luce at auction during the 2026 Monterey Car Week. According to RM Sotheby's, his winning bid of USD 40 million made "Luce Chassis 0" the costliest charity car ever sold at auction, as well as the world's most expensive EV and most expensive new car.
