= Wertheim Performing Arts Center =

The Wertheim Performing Arts Center (also known by the abbreviation WPAC, full name The Herbert and Nicole Wertheim Performing Arts Center) is a performing arts center that opened in 1996. Situated on the main campus of Florida International University (FIU), it is named after Dr. Herbert Wertheim, an inventor, engineer, scientist, educator, clinician, entrepreneur, philanthropist and community leader, founder and president of Brain Power Incorporated and his wife Nicole Wertheim. Both were heavily involved in development of the university.

WPAC houses the Florida International University (FIU) Department of Theatre and FIU School of Music. It is one of Miami's premiere collegiate theatrical and concert venues and is located on FIU's Modesto Maidique Campus (MMC).

The $14 million Center stands as the centerpiece of Florida International University's commitment to the performing arts.
