= Geography of Jamaica =

Jamaica
Native name: Jumieka Nickname: Land of Wood and Water
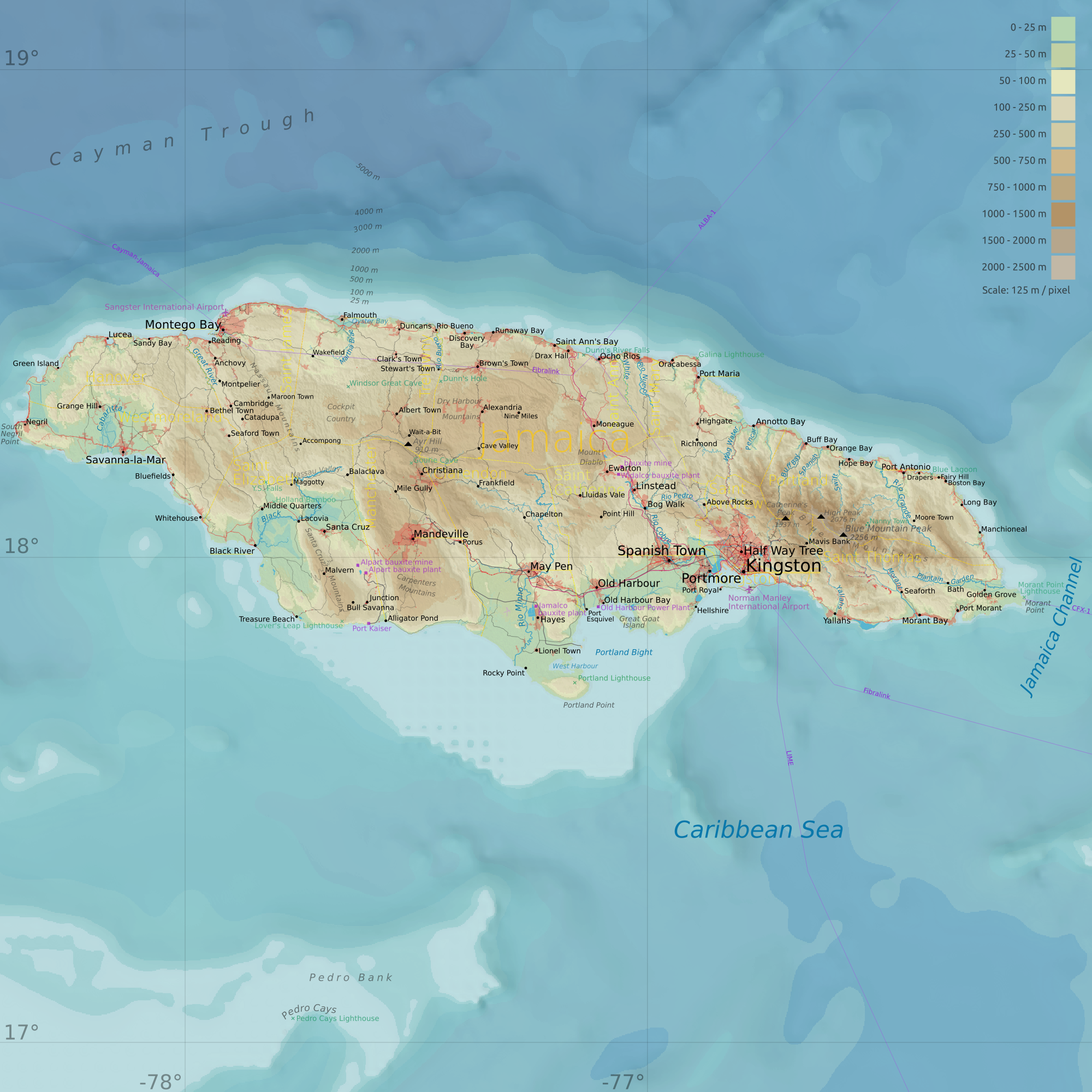
- Map of Jamaica

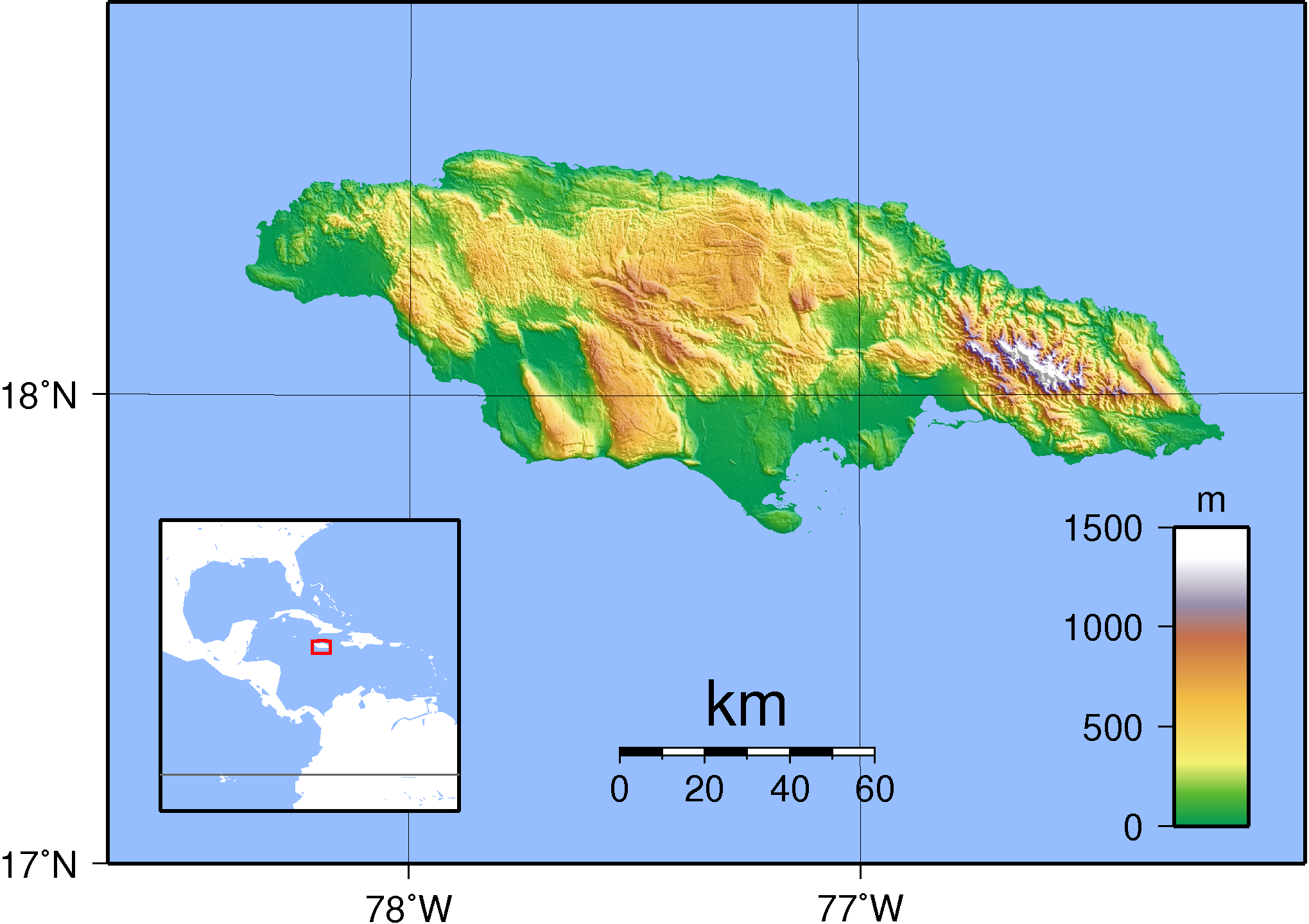

- Location within the Caribbean

Geography
- Location: Caribbean Sea
- Coordinates: 18°15′N 77°30′W
- Archipelago: Greater Antilles
- Area: 10,911 km^{2} (4,213 sq mi)
- Area rank: 71st
- Length: 248 km (154.1 mi)
- Width: 84 km (52.2 mi)
- Coastline: 1,022 km (635 mi)
- Highest elevation: 2,256 m (7402 ft)
- Highest point: Blue Mountain Peak

Administration
- Jamaica
- Largest settlement: Kingston (pop. 651,880)

Demographics
- Population: 2,804,332 (2008)
- Pop. density: 252/km^{2} (653/sq mi)
- Languages: English (Jamaican English); Jamaican Patois; Jamaican Country Sign Language; Jamaican Sign Language; Hakka; Mandarin
- Ethnic groups: 76.3% Black Jamaicans; 15.1% Afro-European; 3.4% Indo-Jamaican; 3.2% White Jamaicans; 1.2% Chinese Jamaican

Additional information
- Time zone: Eastern Standard Time (UTC–5)
- Official website: gov.jm

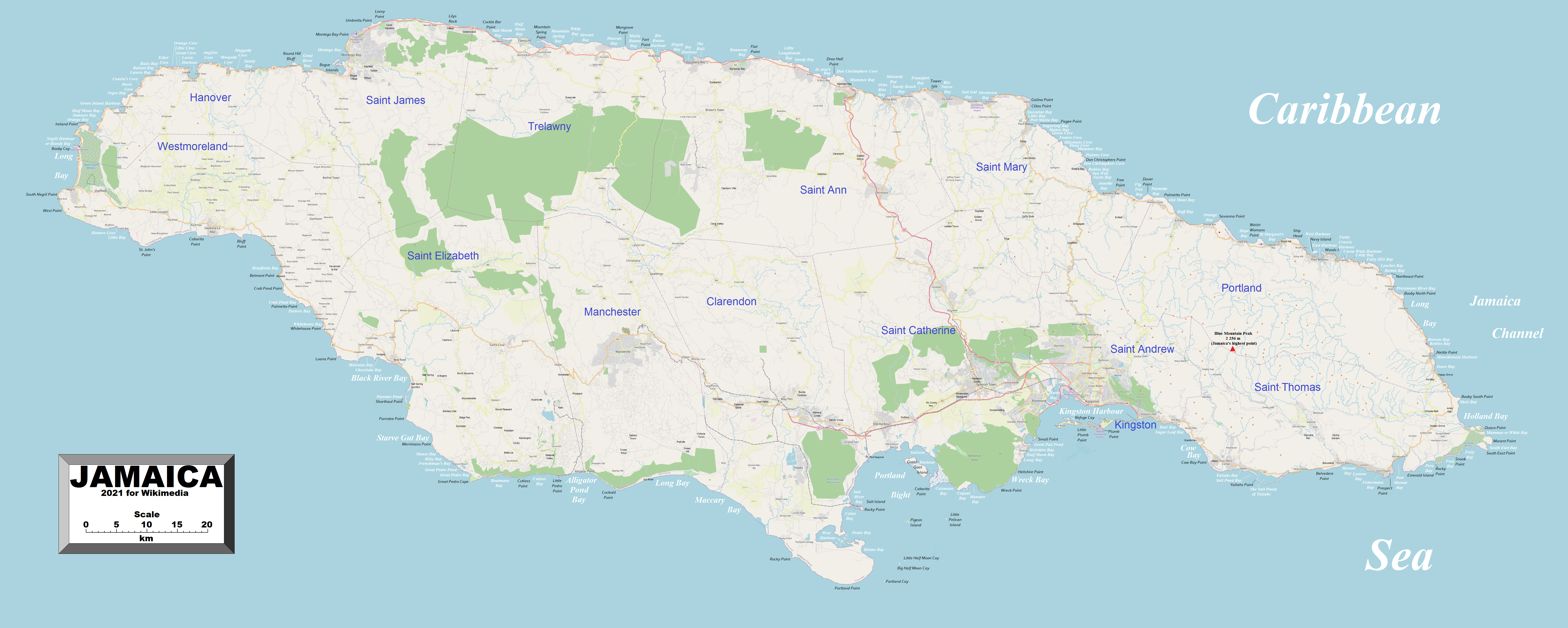
Jamaica's parishes, rivers and population centres and other features

Jamaica lies 140 km (87 mi) south of Cuba and 190 km (118 mi) west of Haiti. At its greatest extent, Jamaica is 235 km (146 mi) long, and its width varies between 34 and 84 km (21 and 52 mi). Jamaica has a small area of 10,992 km^{2} (4,244 sq mi). However, Jamaica is the largest island of the Commonwealth Caribbean and the third largest of the Greater Antilles, after Cuba and Hispaniola. Many small islands are located along the south coast of Jamaica, such as the Port Royal Cays. Southwest of mainland Jamaica lies Pedro Bank, an area of shallow seas, with a number of cays (low islands or reefs), extending generally east to west for over 160 km (99 mi). To the southeast lies Morant Bank, with the Morant Cays, 51 km (32 mi) from Morant Point, the easternmost point of mainland Jamaica. Alice Shoal, 260 km (160 mi) southwest of the main island of Jamaica, falls within the Jamaica–Colombia Joint Regime. It has an Exclusive Economic Zone of 258,137 km^{2} (99,667 mi^{2}).

== Geology and landforms ==
Jamaica (which is a very mountainous country) and the other islands of the Antilles evolved from an arc of ancient volcanoes that rose from the sea millions of years ago. During periods of submersion, thick layers of limestone were laid down over the old igneous and metamorphic rock. In many places, the limestone is thousands of feet thick. The country can be divided into three landform regions: the eastern mountains, the central valleys and plateaus, and the coastal plains.

The highest area is the Blue Mountains range. These eastern mountains are formed by a central ridge of metamorphic rock running northwest to southeast from which many long spurs jut to the north and south. For a distance of over 3 kilometres (1.9 mi), the crest of the ridge exceeds 1,800 metres (5,900 ft). The highest point is Blue Mountain Peak at 2,256 metres (7,402 ft). The Blue Mountains rise to these elevations from the coastal plain in the space of about 16 kilometres (9.9 mi), thus producing one of the steepest general gradients in the world. In this part of the country, the old metamorphic rock reveals itself through the surrounding limestone. To the north of the Blue Mountains lies the strongly tilted limestone plateau forming the John Crow Mountains. This range rises to elevations of over 1,000 metres (3,300 ft). To the west, in the central part of the country, are two high rolling plateaus: the Dry Harbour Mountains to the north and the Manchester Plateau to the south. Between the two, the land is rugged and here, also, the limestone layers are broken by the older rocks. Streams that rise in the region flow outward and sink soon after reaching the limestone layers.

The limestone plateau covers two-thirds of the country, so that karst formations dominate the island. Karst is formed by the erosion of the limestone in solution. Sinkholes, caves and caverns, disappearing streams, hummocky hills, and terra rosa (residual red) soils in the valleys are distinguishing features of a karst landscape; all these are present in Jamaica. To the west of the mountains is the rugged terrain of the Cockpit Country, one of the world's most dramatic examples of karst topography.

The Cockpit Country is pockmarked with steep-sided hollows, as much as 15 metres (49 ft) deep in places, which are separated by conical hills and ridges. On the north, the main defining feature is the fault-based "Escarpment", a long ridge that extends from Flagstaff in the west, through Windsor in the centre, to Campbells and the start of the Barbecue Bottom Road (B10). The Barbecue Bottom Road, which runs north–south, high along the side of a deep, fault-based valley in the east, is the only drivable route across the Cockpit Country. However, there are two old, historical trails that cross further west, the Troy Trail, and the Quick Step Trail, both of which are seldom used as of 2006 and difficult to find. In the southwest, near Quick Step, is the district known as the "Land of Look Behind," so named because Spanish horsemen venturing into this region of hostile runaway slaves were said to have ridden two to a mount, one rider facing to the rear to keep a precautionary watch. Where the ridges between sinkholes in the plateau area have dissolved, flat-bottomed basins or valleys have been formed that are filled with terra rosa soils, some of the most productive on the island. The largest basin is the Vale of Clarendon, 80 km (50 mi) long and 32 km (20 mi) wide. Queen of Spains Valley, Nassau Valley, and Cave Valley were formed by the same process.

== Coasts ==
The coastline of Jamaica is one of many contrasts. The northeast shore is severely eroded by the ocean. There are many small inlets in the rugged coastline, but no coastal plain of any extent. A narrow strip of plains along the northern coast offers calm seas and white sand beaches. Behind the beaches is a flat raised plain of uplifted coral reef.

The southern coast has small stretches of plains lined by black sand beaches. These are backed by cliffs of limestone where the plateaus end. In many stretches with no coastal plain, the cliffs drop 300 metres (980 ft) straight to the sea. In the southwest, broad plains stretch inland for a number of kilometres. The Black River courses 70 kilometres (43 mi) through the largest of these plains. The Rio Minho is 92.8 km long and is the longest river in Jamaica (previously, the Black River was thought to be the longest). The swamplands of the Great Morass and the Upper Morass fill much of the plains. The western coastline contains the island's finest beaches.

== Climate ==
Köppen climate classification zones of Jamaica.

Kingston

Climate chart (precipitation, max. and min. temperature)
| J | F | M | A | M | J | J | A | S | O | N | D |
| 19 30 21 | 19 30 21 | 20 30 22 | 30 31 23 | 100 32 24 | 74 32 24 | 42 33 24 | 98 33 24 | 114 32 24 | 177 32 23 | 65 31 23 | 47 31 22 |
- █ Average max. and min. temperatures in °C
- █ Precipitation totals in mm
- Source: Meteorological Service, Jamaica
Imperial conversion
| J | F | M | A | M | J | J | A | S | O | N | D |
| 0.7 86 70 | 0.7 86 70 | 0.8 86 72 | 1.2 88 73 | 3.9 90 75 | 2.9 90 75 | 1.7 91 75 | 3.9 91 75 | 4.5 90 75 | 7 90 73 | 2.6 88 73 | 1.9 88 72 |
- █ Average max. and min. temperatures in °F
- █ Precipitation totals in inches

Two types of climate are found in Jamaica. An upland tropical climate prevails on the windward side of the mountains, whereas a semiarid climate predominates on the leeward side. Warm trade winds from the east and northeast bring rainfall throughout the year. The rainfall is heaviest from May to October, with peaks in those two months. The average rainfall is 1,960 millimetres (77.2 in) per year. Rainfall is much greater in the mountain areas facing the north and east, however. Where the higher elevations of the John Crow Mountains and the Blue Mountains catch the rain from the moisture-laden winds, rainfall exceeds 5,080 millimetres (200 in) per year. Since the southwestern half of the island lies in the rain shadow of the mountains, it has a semiarid climate and receives fewer than 760 millimetres (29.9 in) of rainfall annually.

Temperatures in Jamaica are fairly constant throughout the year, averaging 23.5 to 30 °C (74.3 to 86.0 °F) in the lowlands and 15 to 22 °C (59.0 to 71.6 °F) at higher elevations. Temperatures may dip to below 10 °C (50 °F) at the peaks of the Blue Mountains. The island receives, in addition to the northeast trade winds, refreshing onshore breezes during the day and cooling offshore breezes at night. These are known on Jamaica as the "Doctor Breeze" and the "Undertaker's Breeze," respectively.

Jamaica lies in the Main Development Region for tropical cyclone activity in the Atlantic, and as a result, it sometimes experiences significant storm damage. Powerful hurricanes which have hit the island directly causing death and destruction include Hurricane Charlie in 1951 and Hurricane Gilbert in 1988. Several other powerful hurricanes have passed near to the island with damaging effects. In 1980, for example, Hurricane Allen destroyed nearly all Jamaica's banana crop. Hurricane Ivan (2004) swept past the island causing heavy damage and a number of deaths; in 2005, Hurricanes Dennis and Emily brought heavy rains to the island. A Category 4 hurricane, Hurricane Dean, caused some deaths and heavy damage to Jamaica in August 2007. In 2025, the western part of the country was struck by the full force of Hurricane Melissa, which made landfall in New Hope, Westmoreland Parish, far surpassing any previous tropical cyclone landfall in the country.

The first recorded hurricane to hit Jamaica was in 1519. The island has been struck by tropical cyclones regularly. During two of the coldest periods in the last 250 years (1780s and 1810s), the frequency of hurricanes in the Jamaica region was unusually high. Another peak of activity occurred in the 1910s, the coldest decade of the 20th century. On the other hand, hurricane formation was greatly diminished from 1968 to 1994, which coincides with the great Sahel drought.

Climate data for Kingston (St. George's College, Jamaica)
| Month | Jan | Feb | Mar | Apr | May | Jun | Jul | Aug | Sep | Oct | Nov | Dec | Year |
|---|---|---|---|---|---|---|---|---|---|---|---|---|---|
| Mean daily maximum °C (°F) | 30.3 (86.5) | 30.2 (86.4) | 30.7 (87.3) | 31.1 (88.0) | 31.6 (88.9) | 32.1 (89.8) | 32.8 (91.0) | 32.7 (90.9) | 32.1 (89.8) | 31.7 (89.1) | 31.2 (88.2) | 30.6 (87.1) | 31.4 (88.5) |
| Mean daily minimum °C (°F) | 21.1 (70.0) | 21.0 (69.8) | 21.6 (70.9) | 22.6 (72.7) | 23.6 (74.5) | 24.2 (75.6) | 24.3 (75.7) | 24.2 (75.6) | 24.0 (75.2) | 23.4 (74.1) | 22.8 (73.0) | 21.8 (71.2) | 22.9 (73.2) |
| Average precipitation mm (inches) | 18 (0.7) | 19 (0.7) | 20 (0.8) | 39 (1.5) | 100 (3.9) | 74 (2.9) | 42 (1.7) | 98 (3.9) | 114 (4.5) | 177 (7.0) | 65 (2.6) | 47 (1.9) | 813 (32.0) |
| Average precipitation days | 5 | 5 | 5 | 7 | 8 | 7 | 6 | 9 | 11 | 14 | 10 | 6 | 93 |
| Average relative humidity (%) (at 13:00) | 64 | 64 | 64 | 66 | 68 | 67 | 64 | 66 | 71 | 73 | 69 | 65 | 67 |
| Mean monthly sunshine hours | 257.3 | 240.1 | 260.4 | 258.0 | 254.2 | 237.0 | 260.4 | 257.3 | 213.0 | 223.2 | 222.0 | 235.6 | 2,918.5 |
| Mean daily sunshine hours | 8.3 | 8.5 | 8.4 | 8.6 | 8.2 | 7.9 | 8.4 | 8.3 | 7.1 | 7.2 | 7.4 | 7.6 | 8.0 |
Source: Meteorological Service (Jamaica)

Climate data for Kingston (Norman Manley International Airport) extremes 1852–present
| Month | Jan | Feb | Mar | Apr | May | Jun | Jul | Aug | Sep | Oct | Nov | Dec | Year |
|---|---|---|---|---|---|---|---|---|---|---|---|---|---|
| Record high °C (°F) | 35.1 (95.2) | 34.8 (94.6) | 35.1 (95.2) | 35.7 (96.3) | 35.0 (95.0) | 36.9 (98.4) | 37.1 (98.8) | 36.1 (97.0) | 35.8 (96.4) | 35.4 (95.7) | 37.1 (98.8) | 35.0 (95.0) | 37.1 (98.8) |
| Mean daily maximum °C (°F) | 29.8 (85.6) | 29.6 (85.3) | 29.8 (85.6) | 30.3 (86.5) | 30.8 (87.4) | 31.2 (88.2) | 31.7 (89.1) | 31.9 (89.4) | 31.7 (89.1) | 31.3 (88.3) | 31.1 (88.0) | 30.5 (86.9) | 30.8 (87.4) |
| Mean daily minimum °C (°F) | 22.3 (72.1) | 22.3 (72.1) | 22.9 (73.2) | 22.6 (72.7) | 24.7 (76.5) | 25.3 (77.5) | 25.6 (78.1) | 25.3 (77.5) | 25.3 (77.5) | 24.8 (76.6) | 24.1 (75.4) | 23.1 (73.6) | 24.0 (75.2) |
| Record low °C (°F) | 18.5 (65.3) | 18.0 (64.4) | 18.0 (64.4) | 19.2 (66.6) | 20.0 (68.0) | 21.0 (69.8) | 20.6 (69.1) | 19.9 (67.8) | 20.0 (68.0) | 19.0 (66.2) | 19.0 (66.2) | 18.0 (64.4) | 18.0 (64.4) |
| Average precipitation mm (inches) | 18 (0.7) | 16 (0.6) | 14 (0.6) | 27 (1.1) | 100 (3.9) | 83 (3.3) | 40 (1.6) | 81 (3.2) | 107 (4.2) | 167 (6.6) | 61 (2.4) | 31 (1.2) | 745 (29.3) |
| Average precipitation days | 10 | 8 | 7 | 9 | 11 | 7 | 6 | 6 | 9 | 12 | 11 | 9 | 105 |
| Average relative humidity (%) (at 13:00) | 81 | 77 | 76 | 78 | 78 | 75 | 75 | 76 | 78 | 78 | 80 | 81 | 78 |
| Mean monthly sunshine hours | 226.3 | 211.9 | 241.8 | 228.0 | 229.4 | 234.0 | 266.6 | 254.2 | 234.0 | 232.5 | 225.0 | 226.3 | 2,810 |
| Mean daily sunshine hours | 7.3 | 7.5 | 7.8 | 7.6 | 7.4 | 7.8 | 8.6 | 8.2 | 7.8 | 7.5 | 7.5 | 7.3 | 7.7 |
Source 1: Meteorological Service (Jamaica)
Source 2: Meteo Climat (record highs and lows)

Climate data for Montego Bay
| Month | Jan | Feb | Mar | Apr | May | Jun | Jul | Aug | Sep | Oct | Nov | Dec | Year |
|---|---|---|---|---|---|---|---|---|---|---|---|---|---|
| Record high °C (°F) | 32.8 (91.0) | 33.3 (91.9) | 34.2 (93.6) | 37.8 (100.0) | 38.9 (102.0) | 37.8 (100.0) | 35.6 (96.1) | 36.1 (97.0) | 36.2 (97.2) | 35.0 (95.0) | 34.7 (94.5) | 32.5 (90.5) | 38.9 (102.0) |
| Mean daily maximum °C (°F) | 27.9 (82.2) | 27.9 (82.2) | 28.7 (83.7) | 29.4 (84.9) | 30.3 (86.5) | 31.1 (88.0) | 31.3 (88.3) | 31.4 (88.5) | 31.1 (88.0) | 30.4 (86.7) | 29.4 (84.9) | 28.4 (83.1) | 29.8 (85.6) |
| Mean daily minimum °C (°F) | 22.3 (72.1) | 22.1 (71.8) | 22.6 (72.7) | 23.2 (73.8) | 24.0 (75.2) | 24.5 (76.1) | 24.8 (76.6) | 24.8 (76.6) | 24.6 (76.3) | 24.4 (75.9) | 24.1 (75.4) | 22.9 (73.2) | 23.7 (74.7) |
| Record low °C (°F) | 13.3 (55.9) | 12.8 (55.0) | 14.7 (58.5) | 15.3 (59.5) | 19.2 (66.6) | 19.4 (66.9) | 18.3 (64.9) | 19.7 (67.5) | 20.0 (68.0) | 17.2 (63.0) | 18.3 (64.9) | 16.4 (61.5) | 12.8 (55.0) |
| Average precipitation mm (inches) | 89 (3.5) | 64 (2.5) | 35 (1.4) | 57 (2.2) | 104 (4.1) | 120 (4.7) | 65 (2.6) | 96 (3.8) | 129 (5.1) | 164 (6.5) | 115 (4.5) | 102 (4.0) | 1,140 (44.9) |
| Average precipitation days (≥ 1.0 mm) | 11 | 9 | 7 | 7 | 12 | 11 | 8 | 10 | 14 | 14 | 13 | 11 | 127 |
| Average relative humidity (%) | 77 | 76 | 75 | 74 | 76 | 78 | 76 | 77 | 78 | 79 | 79 | 78 | 77 |
| Mean monthly sunshine hours | 229.4 | 217.5 | 251.1 | 252.0 | 251.1 | 237.0 | 254.2 | 238.7 | 210.0 | 217.0 | 213.0 | 217.0 | 2,788 |
| Mean daily sunshine hours | 7.4 | 7.7 | 8.1 | 8.4 | 8.1 | 7.9 | 8.2 | 7.7 | 7.0 | 7.0 | 7.1 | 7.0 | 7.6 |
Source: Deutscher Wetterdienst

== Vegetation and wildlife ==
Although most of Jamaica's native vegetation has been stripped in order to make room for cultivation, some areas have been left virtually undisturbed since the time of European colonization. Indigenous vegetation can be found along the northern coast, from Rio Bueno to Discovery Bay, in the highest parts of the Blue Mountains, and in the heart of the Cockpit Country.

As in the case of vegetation, considerable loss of wildlife has occurred, beginning with the settlement of the Taíno in the region millennia ago. For example, the Caribbean monk seal (Neomonachus tropicalis) once occurred in Jamaican waters, and has now been driven to extinction. Mongooses (Urva auropunctata), introduced to Jamaica in 1872 to reduce rat populations that damaged commercial sugarcane (Saccharum officinarum) crops, prey on several Jamaican species, including the critically endangered Jamaican iguana (Cyclura collei), and have been implicated in the historical population declines and extinctions of many others.

Other wildlife species inhabiting the island include the West Indian manatee (Trichechus manatus), the American crocodile (Crocodylus acutus), and the endemic and endangered Homerus swallowtail butterfly (Papilio homerus), which is the largest butterfly species in the Western Hemisphere.

== Extreme points ==
- Northernmost point: Half Moon Point, Saint James Parish
- Southernmost point: Portland Point, Clarendon Parish
- Westernmost point: South Negril Point, Westmoreland Parish
- Easternmost point: Morant Point, Saint Thomas Parish

== Environmental policy ==
There are policies that are being put into place to help preserve the ocean and the life below water. The goal of integrated coastal zone management (ICZM) is to improve the quality of life of human communities who depend on coastal resources while maintaining the biological diversity and productivity of coastal ecosystems. Developing an underdeveloped country can impact the ocean's ecosystem because of all the construction that would be done to develop the country. Over-building, driven by powerful market forces as well as poverty among some sectors of the population, and destructive exploitation contribute to the decline of ocean and coastal resources. Developing practices that will contribute to the lives of the people but also to the life of the ocean and its ecosystem. Some of these practices include: Develop sustainable fisheries practices, ensure sustainable mariculture techniques and practices, sustainable management of shipping, and promote sustainable tourism practices. As for tourism, tourism is the number one source of foreign exchange earnings in Jamaica and, as such is vital to the national economy. Tourists typically go to countries unaware of issues and how they impact those issues. Tourists are not going to be used to living in a different style compared to their own country. Practices such as: providing sewage treatment facilities for all tourist areas, determining carrying capacity of the environment prior to planning tourism activities, and providing alternative types of tourist activities can help to get desired results, such as the development of alternative tourism which will reduce the current pressure on resources that support traditional tourism activities. A study was conducted to see how tourism could help with sustainable financing for ocean and coastal management in Jamaica. Instead of using tourist fees they would call them environmental fees. This study aims to inform the relevant stakeholders of the feasibility of implementing environmental fees as well as the likely impact of such revenue generating instruments on the current tourist visitation rates to the island. The development of a user fee system would help fund environmental management and protection. The results show that tourists have a high consumer surplus associated with a vacation in Jamaica, and have a significantly lower willingness to pay for a tourism tax when compared to an environmental tax. The findings of the study show that the "label" of the tax and as well as the respondent's awareness of the institutional mechanisms for environmental protection and tourism are important to their decision framework. Tourists are more willing to pay for environmental fees rather than tourist tax fees. A tax high enough to fund for environmental management and protection but low enough to continue to bring tourists to Jamaica. It has been shown that if an environmental tax of $1 per person were introduced it would not cause a significant decline in visitation rates and would generate revenues of US$1.7M per year.

== See also ==
- List of cities and towns in Jamaica
- List of islands of Jamaica
- Port Royal Cays
