= List of National Heritage Sites in Jamaica =

This is a complete list of National Heritage sites in Jamaica as published by the Jamaica National Heritage Trust.

== Reference Map of Jamaica ==

Cornwall County		Capital	km^{2}	Middlesex County		Capital	km^{2}	Surrey County		Capital	km^{2}
1	Hanover	Lucea	450	6	Clarendon	May Pen	1,196	11	Kingston	Kingston	25
2	Saint Elizabeth	Black River	1,212	7	Manchester	Mandeville	830	12	Portland	Port Antonio	814
3	Saint James	Montego Bay	595	8	Saint Ann	St. Ann's Bay	1,213	13	Saint Andrew	Half Way Tree	453
4	Trelawny	Falmouth	875	9	Saint Catherine	Spanish Town	1,192	14	Saint Thomas	Morant Bay	743
5	Westmoreland	Savanna-la-Mar	807	10	Saint Mary	Port Maria	611				

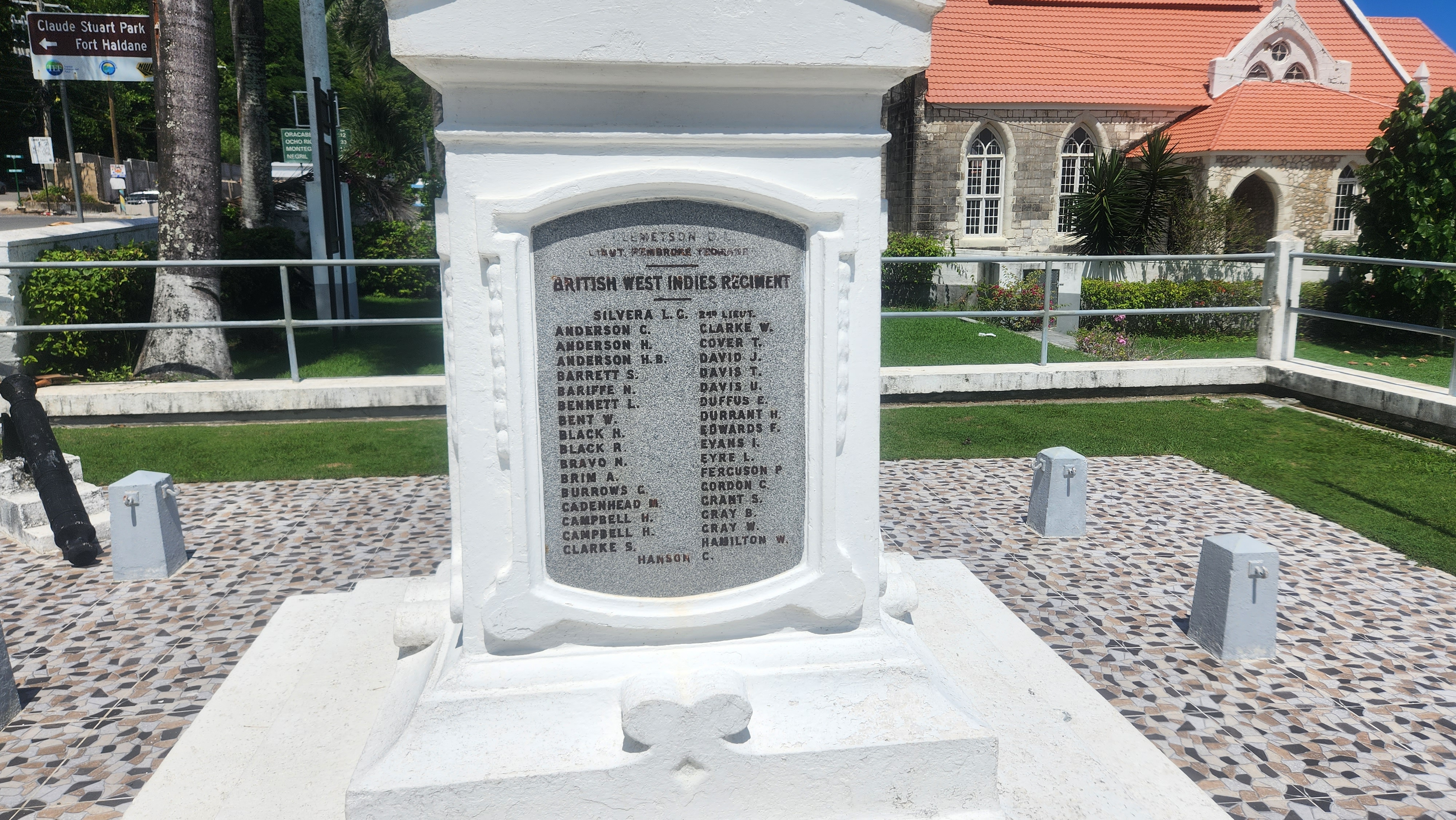
BWI WWI memorial, Port Maria 20231007 120454

== Clarendon ==
Buildings of architectural and historic interest

- Halse Hall Great House

Churches, cemeteries & tombs

- St. Peter's Church, Alley

Clock towers

- May Pen Clock Tower

Natural sites

- Milk River Spa

Botanical

- Mason River Botanical Station

Lighthouses

- Portland Lighthouse

== Hanover ==
Buildings of architectural and historic interest

- The Great Barbican Estate
- Tamarind Lodge
- Old Hanover Gaol/Old Police Barracks, Lucea
- Tryall Great House, and Ruins of Sugar Works

Forts and naval and military monuments

- Fort Charlotte, Lucea

Historic sites

- Blenheim – Birthplace of National Hero – The Rt. Excellent Sir Alexander Bustamante

== Kingston ==
Buildings of architectural and historic interest

- 40 Harbour Street
- Headquarters House, Duke Street
- Kingston railway station, Barry Street
- The Admiralty Houses, Port Royal

Churches, cemeteries & tombs

- Old Jewish Cemetery, Hunts Bay
- Negro Aroused
- Coke Methodist Church, East Parade
- Kingston Parish Church, South Parade
- Wesley Methodist Church, Tower Street
- Holy Trinity Cathedral, North Street

Statues and other memorials

- The Bust of General Antonio Maceo, National Heroes' Park
- The Cenotaph, National Heroes' Park
- Negro Aroused, Ocean Boulevard
- The Monument to Rt. Excellent Alexander Bustamante, National Heroes' Park
- The Monument to Rt. Excellencies George William Gordon and Paul Bogle, National Heroes Park
- The Monument to Rt. Excellent Marcus Garvey, National Heroes' Park
- The Monument to Rt. Excellent Norman Manley, National Heroes' Park
- The Monument to Rt. Excellent Sam Sharp, National Heroes' Park
- The Monument to Rt. Excellent Nanny of the Maroons, National Heroes' Park
- Monument to the Rt. Excellent Sam Sharpe, National Heroes' Park
- The Monument to Rt. Hon. Donald Sangster, National Heroes' Park
- The Statue of Queen Victoria (St. William Grant Park)
- The Statue of Father Joseph Dupont (SWGP)
- The Statue of Hon. Edward Jordan (SWGP)
- The Statue of Sir Charles Metcalfe (SWGP)
- The Statue of Rt. Excellent Alexander Bustamante (SWGP)

Forts and naval and military monuments

- Fort Charles, Port Royal

Historic sites

- Liberty Hall, 76 King Street
- Port Royal and the Palisadoes

Public buildings

- Ward Theatre, North Parade
- George William Gordon House, Duke Street

== Manchester ==
Buildings of architectural and historic interest

- Marlborough Great House, Spur Tree
- Four Buildings on the compound of the Northern Caribbean University Campus, Mandeville
- Marshall's Pen Great House
- Sutton railway station, Jamaica
- Williamsfield railway station

Historic sites

- Roxborough Castle Plantation – birthplace of National Hero, the Rt. Excellent Norman Manley

Public buildings

- Mandeville Court House

== Portland ==
Buildings of architectural and historic interest

- DeMontevin Lodge, Port Antonio
- Orange Bay railway station
- Port Antonio railway station

Churches, cemeteries & tombs

- Christ Church Anglican, Port Antonio

Forts and naval and military monuments

- Fort George, Titchfield
- The Old Military Barracks, Titchfield

Public buildings

- Buff Bay Court House
- Port Antonio Court House

Lighthouses

- Folly Lighthouse

Statues and other memorials

- The Cenotaph, Port Antonio

Historic sites

- Titchfield Peninsula
- Port Antonio railway station grounds(?)

== St Andrew ==
Aqueducts, bridges & dams

- Papine-Mona Aqueduct, UWI Mona Campus

Buildings of architectural and historic interest

- Bob Marley Museum, Hope Road
- Jamaica College Buildings: Simms Hall, Scotland Building, Assembly Hall, Chapel
- Charlottenburgh House, Guava Ridge
- Mico College Buildings: Kelvin Lodge, Cottage, Porter's Lodge, Chapel
- Admiral's Mountain Great House, Cooper's Hill
- Cherry Garden Great House, 46 Russell Heights
- Devon House, Hope Road
- Mona Great House, off Mona Road
- Oakton House, Maxfield Avenue
- “Regardless”, 4 Washington Drive
- 24 Tucker Avenue, former residence of National Hero, the Rt. Excellent Alexander Bustamante

Churches, cemeteries & tombs

- Jamaica Free Baptist Church, August Town Road
- St. Andrew Parish Church, Hagley Park Road
- University of the West Indies Chapel,

Clock towers

- Half Way Tree Clock Tower

Public building

- Buxton House, Mico College Campus
- UWI Mona Campus

Lighthouses

- Plumb Point Lighthouse

Natural sites

- Hope Botanical Gardens, Old Hope Road
- Rockfort Mineral Bath and Spa, Sir Florizel Glasspole Boulevard

== St Ann ==
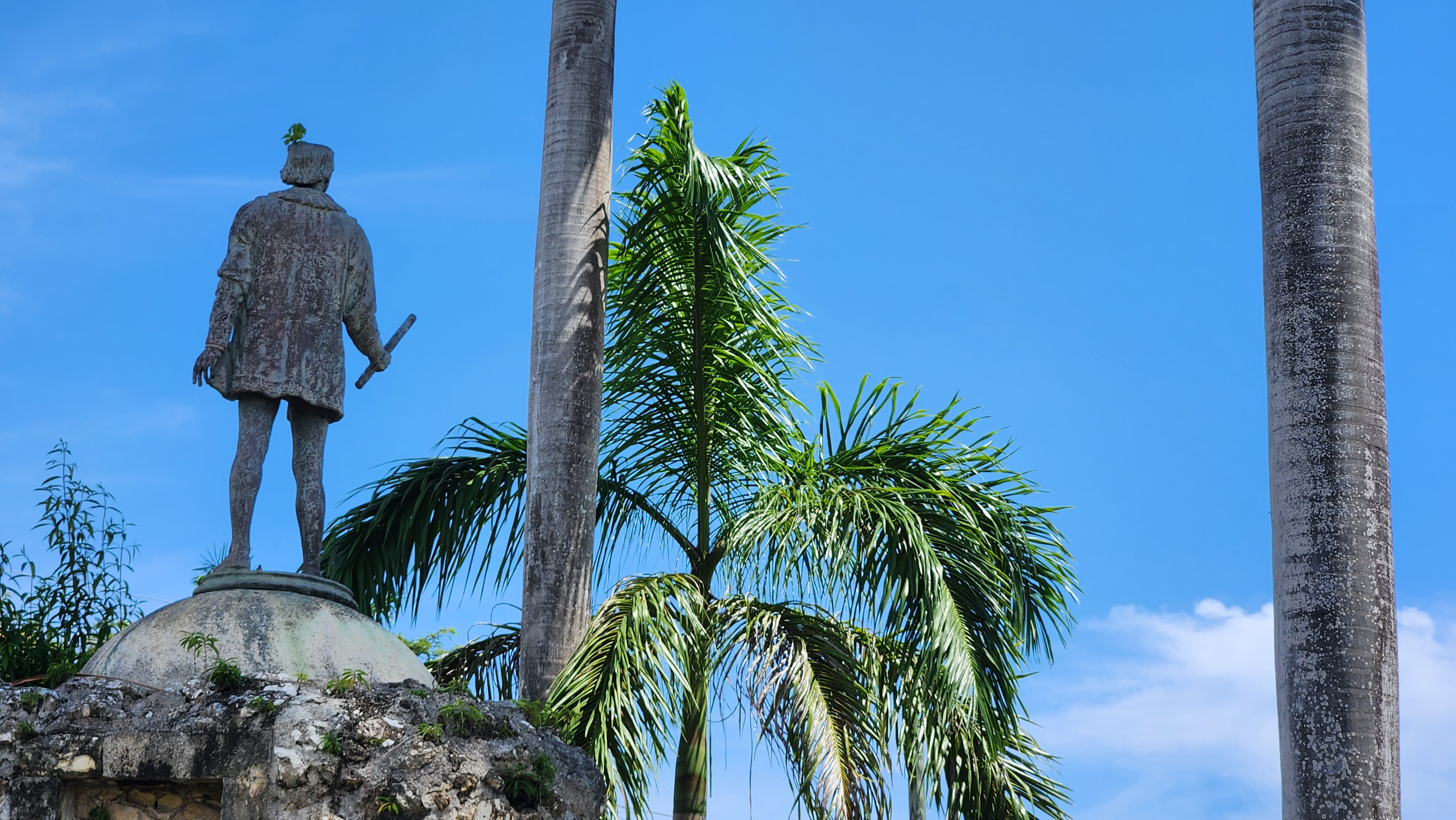
Statue of Cristobal Columbus St. Ann's Bay, Jamaica

Buildings of architectural and historic interest

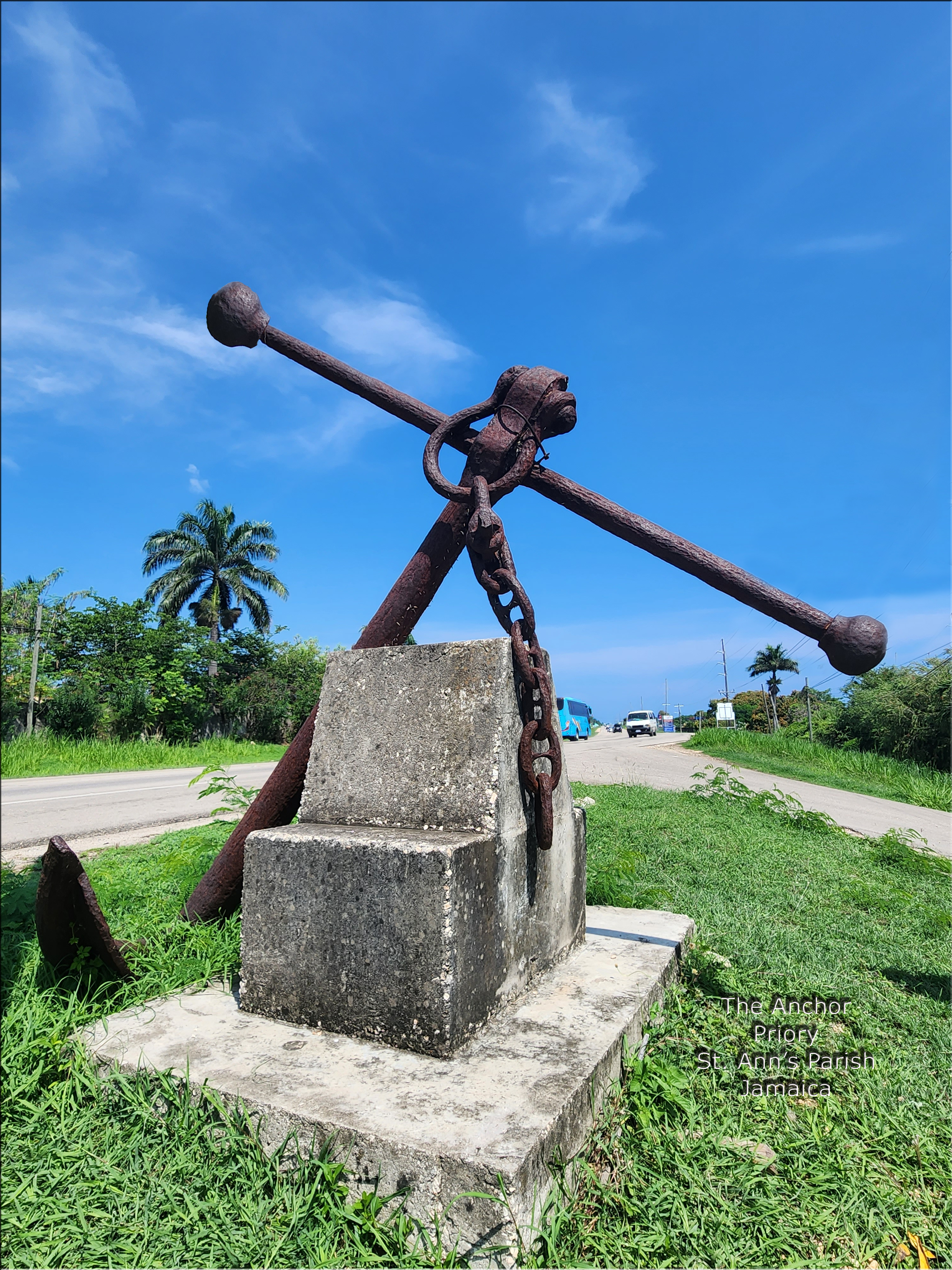
Anchor Priory 20230605

- Bellevue Great House, Orange Hall
- Edinburgh Castle – ruins, main road from Harmony Vale to Pedro
- Moneague Inn
- Seville Great House
- Moneague Hotel, Moneague College Campus
- Cave Valley Chimney
- Our Lady of Perpetual Help Church
- St. Peter Martyr Site
- Bellevue Great House
- Iolaus
- Priory anchor
- Mount Plenty Great House, Orange Hall
- Seville Great House
- Columbus Statue, St. Ann's Bay

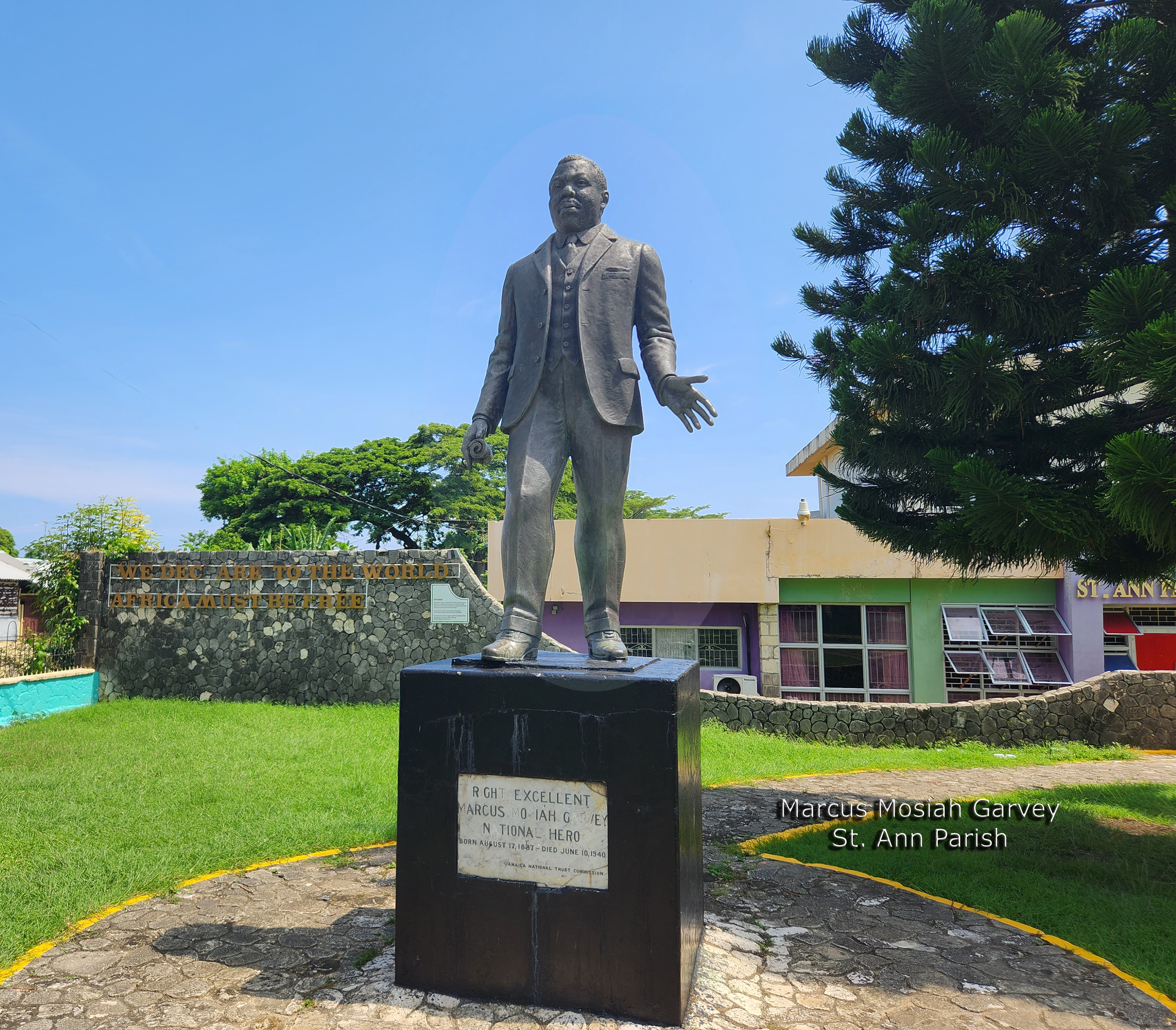
Marcus Garvey 20230605

Churches, cemeteries & tombs

- Our Lady of Perpetual Help Church, St. Ann's Bay
- St. Peter Martyr Site (ruins of old Church), St. Ann's Bay

Historic sites

- 32 Market Street, St. Ann's Bay – birthplace of National Hero the Rt. Excellent Marcus Garvey

Miscellaneous

- Cave Valley Chimney

== St Catherine ==
Aqueducts, bridges & dams

- Bushy Park Aqueduct
- Old Iron Bridge, Spanish Town

Buildings of architectural and historic interest

- Altenheim House, 24 King Street, Spanish Town
- Colbeck Castle – ruin, near Old Harbour
- Highgate House, Sligoville
- Old Harbour railway station
- Spanish Town railway station

Caves and middens

- Mountain River Cave, Cudjoe Hill
- Two Sisters Caves, Hellsh
- Whitemarl Arawak Museum

Historic sites

- Port Henderson
- Spanish Town Historic District

Churches, cemeteries & tombs

- Cathedral of St. Jago de la Vega (Anglican), Spanish Town
- Phillippo Baptist Church, Spanish Town
- St. Dorothy's Anglican, Spanish Town to Old Harbour main road
- Spanish Town Cathedral

== St Elizabeth ==
Buildings of architectural and historic interest

- Appleton Railway Station
- Golmont View House, Reading
- Invercauld House, Black River
- Magdala House, Black River
- Three Munro College Buildings: Coke Farquharson Dining Room, Chapel, Pearman Calder Building
- Magdala House & Mineral Spa
- Balaclava railway station

Historic sites

- Black River Historic District

Natural sites

- Black River Spa

Lighthouses

- Lover's Leap Lighthouse

== St James ==
Buildings of architectural and historic interest

- Anchovy railway station
- Barnett Street Police Station, Montego Bay
- Bellefield Great House
- Cambridge railway station, Jamaica
- Cinnamon Hill Great House
- Greenwood Great House
- Grove Hill House, Montego Bay
- Harrison House, Montego Bay
- Montpelier railway station, Jamaica
- No. 1 King Street, Montego Bay
- No. 2 Orange Street and No. 6 Corner Lane
- Roehampton Great House
- Rose Hall Great House
- Town House, Montego Bay

Churches, cemeteries & tombs

- Salter's Hill Baptist Church – ruin
- St. James Parish Church
- St. Mary's Anglican Church, Montpelier

Public buildings

- Old Court House (Montego Bay Civic Centre)

Statues and other memorials

- Sam Sharpe Monument

Industrial

- Ironshore Windmill Tower

Miscellaneous

- Old Albert Market, Montego Bay
- Old Slave Ring, Montego Bay
- The Dome, Montego Bay

== St Mary ==
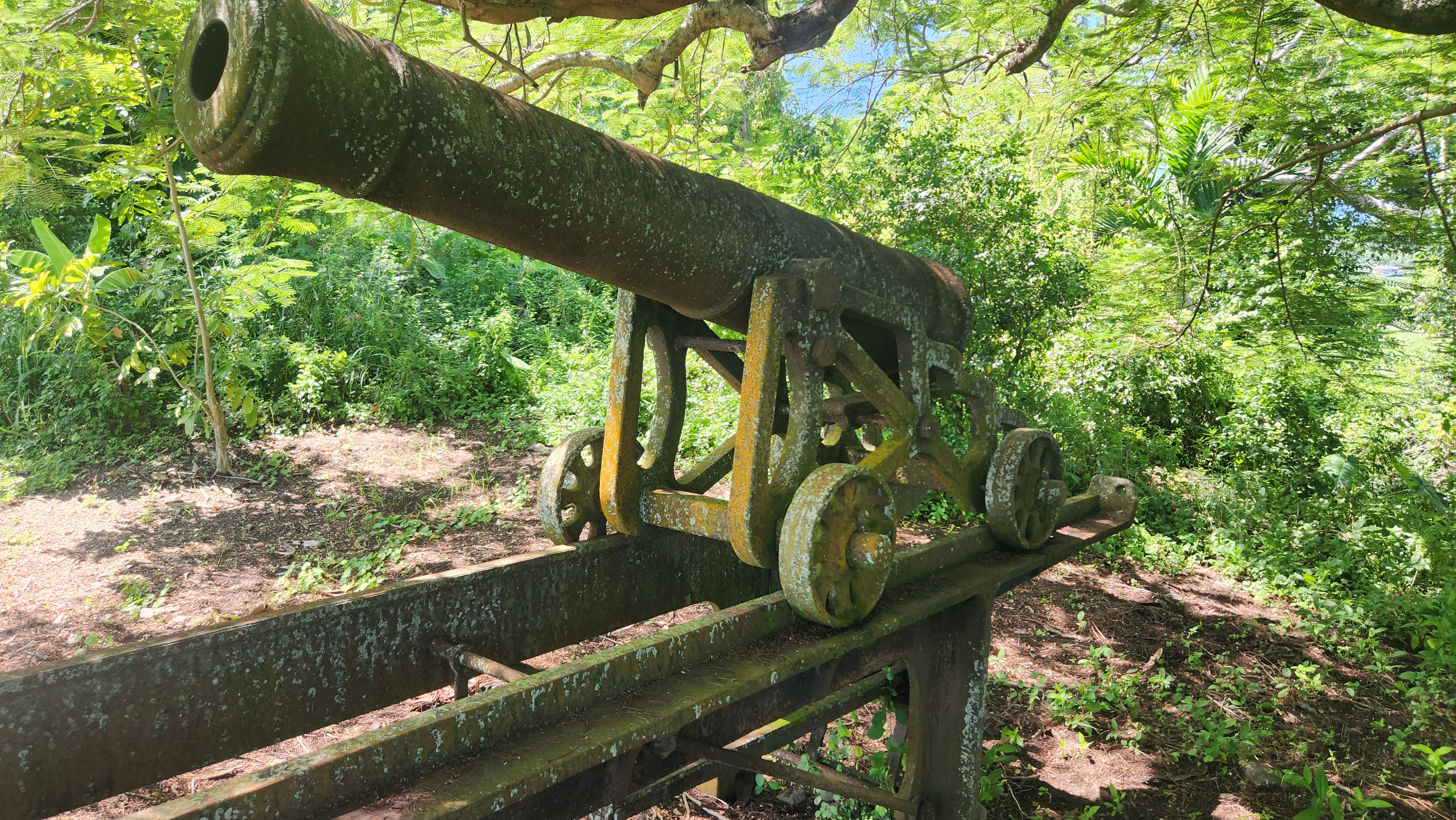
Cannon II at Fort Haldane

Buildings of architectural and historic interest

- Firefly Estate (Noël Coward's House)
- Golden Clouds, Oracabessa
- Harmony Hall Great House
- Wentworth Estate

Lighthouses

- Galina Lighthouse

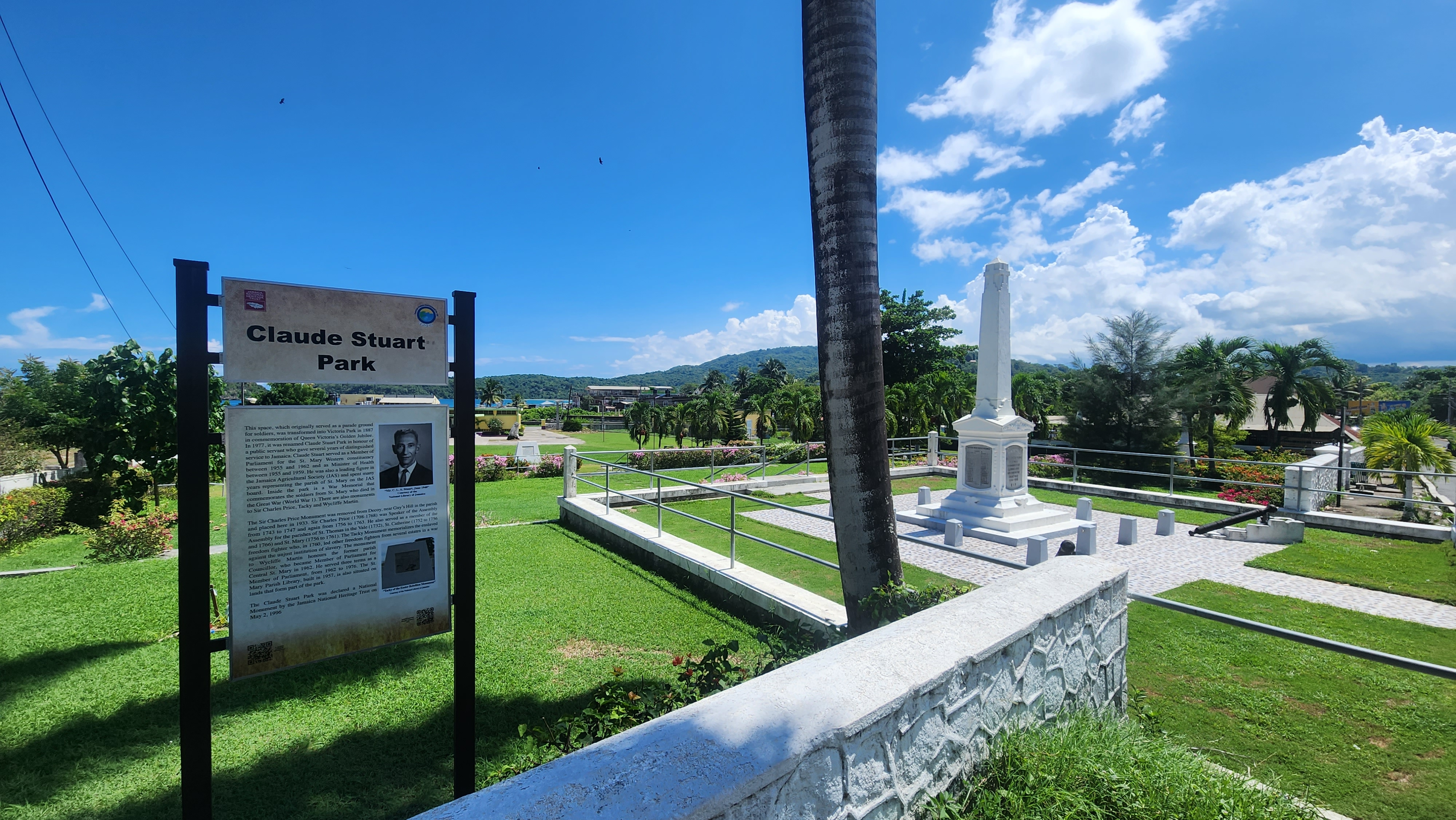
Claude Stuart Park & WWI Cenotaph 20231007

Forts and naval and military monuments

- Fort Haldane

Historic sites

- Rio Nuevo Battle Site

Public buildings

- Old Court House (Port Maria Civic Centre)

Statues and other memorials

- Claude Stuart Park

== St Thomas ==
Buildings of architectural and historic interest

- Orange Park

Churches, Cemeteries & tombs

- Christ Church, Morant Bay

Lighthouses

- Morant Point Lighthouse

Historic sites

- Stony Gut – Home of National Hero, The Rt. Excellent Paul Bogle

Natural sites

- Bath Fountain Spa
- Bath Botanical Gardens

Public buildings

- Morant Bay Court House

Statues and other memorials

- Statue of the Rt. Excellent Paul Bogle, Morant Bay

== Trelawny ==
Buildings of architectural and historic interest

- Barrett House – ruin, 1 Market Street Falmouth
- Carlton House
- Hyde Hall Great House
- Stewart Castle – ruin
- Vale Royal Great House

Churches, cemeteries & tombs

- St. Peter's Anglican Church, Falmouth

Clock towers

- Duncans Clock Tower

Forts and naval and military monuments

- Fort Balcarres, Falmouth

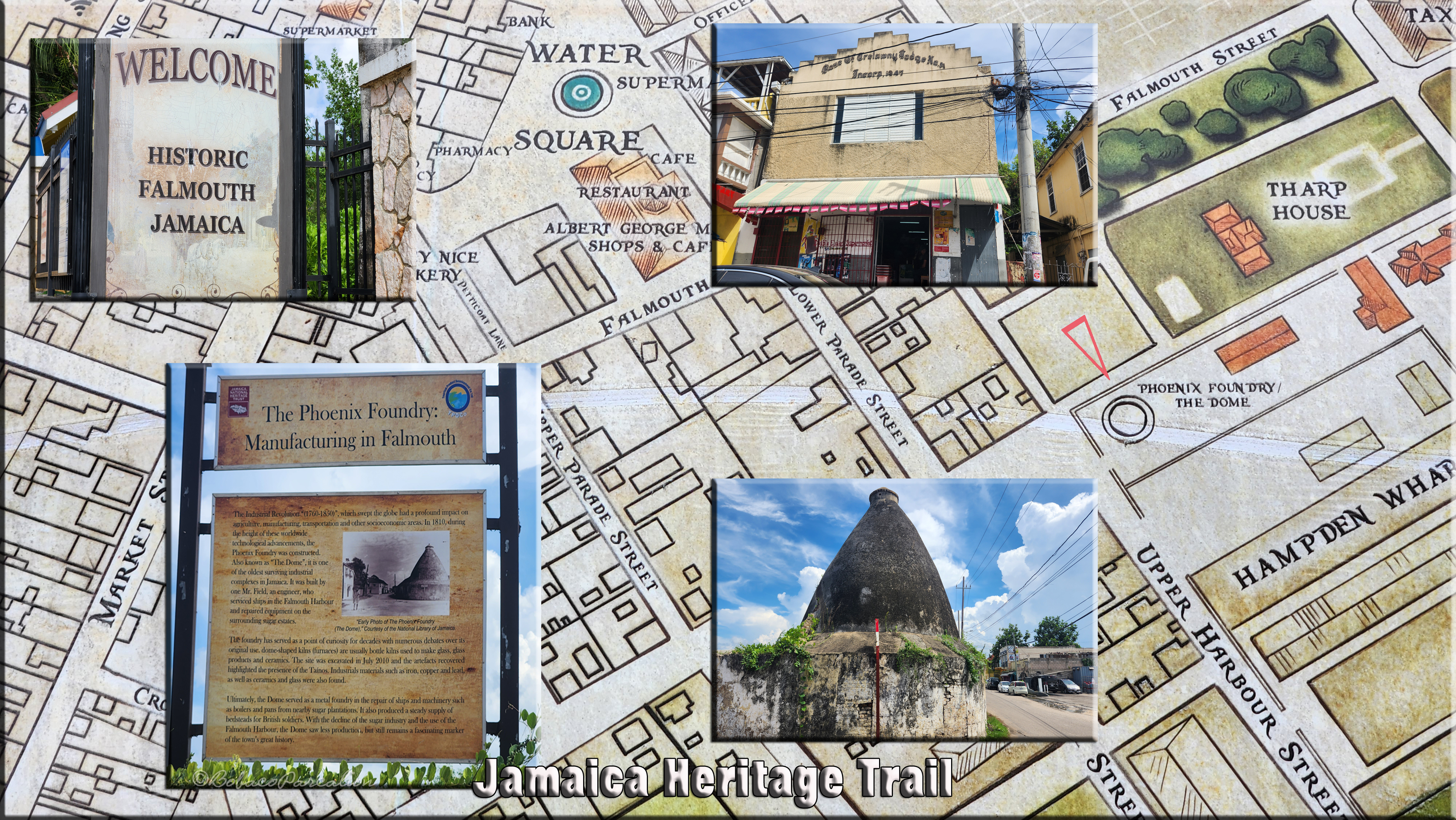
Map of the historic district and the Foundry

Historic site

- Falmouth Historic District

Public buildings

- Falmouth Courthouse
- Falmouth Post Office

== Westmoreland ==
Buildings of architectural and historic interest

- Thomas Manning Building, Savanna-la-mar

Forts and naval and military monuments

- Savanna-la-mar Fort

Lighthouses

- Negril Lighthouse

Miscellaneous

- Cast Iron Fountain

== Underwater cultural heritage ==
- Pedro Bank
