= List of headlands of Jamaica =

List of headlands of Jamaica:

- Half Moon Point
- Morant Point
- Palisadoes
- Portland Point
- South Negril Point
