= List of lighthouses in Jamaica =

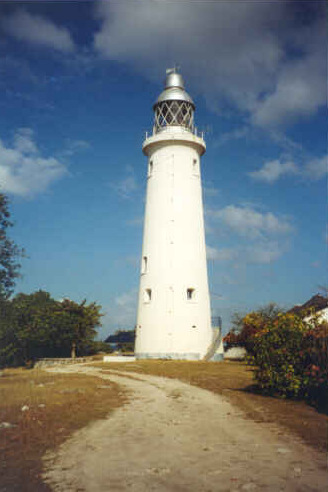
Negril Lighthouse.

This is a list of lighthouses in Jamaica. There are nine onshore lighthouses in operation and two offshore. They are maintained by the Port Authority of Jamaica, an agency of the Ministry of Transport and Works.

== Cornwall ==
- Lover’s Leap Lighthouse, Southfield * 17°52′08.7″N 77°39′38.0″W
- Negril Lighthouse, Negril * 18°14′55.0″N 78°21′38.2″W
- Rose Hall Lighthouse, St James * 18°31′24.6″N 77°48′47.5″W

== Middlesex ==
- Galina Lighthouse, Galina * 18°24′36.13″N 76°53′33.32″W
- Lazaretto Cairn Lighthouse, St Catherine Parish * 18°14′54.35″N 77°21′37.84″W
- Portland Lighthouse, Portland Point * 17°44′32.43″N 77°9′27.38″W

== Surrey ==
- Folly Lighthouse, Port Antonio * 18°11′19.9″N 76°26′35.17″W
- Morant Point Lighthouse, Morant Point * 17°55′6.43″N 76°11′3.47″W
- Plumb Point Lighthouse, Palisadoes * 17°55′43.2″N 76°46′41.58″W

== Offshore ==
- Morant Cays Lighthouse, Morant Cays * 17°55′6.43″N 76°11′3.47″W
- Pedro Cays Lighthouse, Pedro Bank * 17°3′0.2″N 77°46′0.82″W

== See also ==
- Transport in Jamaica
- Lists of lighthouses and lightvessels
