= Pedro Cays Lighthouse =

- Location: NE of Cay; Pedro Cays; Jamaica
- Coordinates: 17.050056°N 77.766895°W

Tower
- Height: 11 metres (36 ft)
- Markings: red square topmark, white bands
- Power source: solar power

Light
- Focal height: 11 m (36 ft)
- Range: 11 kilometres (6.8 mi)
- Characteristic: Fl W 5s.

Pedro Cays Lighthouse is a lighted beacon 60 miles (97 km) south of Jamaica on the north side of Northeast Cay (Top Cay) in the Pedro Cays. The Pedro Cays are administratively part of Kingston, Jamaica.

It is maintained by the Port Authority of Jamaica, an agency of the Ministry of Transport and Works.

== See also ==
- List of lighthouses in Jamaica.
