= List of shipwrecks in July 1878 =

The list of shipwrecks in July 1878 includes ships sunk, foundered, grounded, or otherwise lost during July 1878.

== 1 July ==
List of shipwrecks: 1 July 1878
Ship	State	Description
Lord of the Isles	United Kingdom	The ship was driven ashore and damaged at "St. Andres", Samar, Spanish East Indies. Her crew were rescued. She was on a voyage from Newcastle, New South Wales to Manila, Spanish East Indies. Following repairs, she was refloated and towed in to Manila, where she arrived on 7 September.

== 2 July ==
List of shipwrecks: 2 July 1878
Ship	State	Description
Capital City	United States	The steamer caught fire while loading cottonseed oil at Memphis, Tennessee. Several lives were lost, and the river was alight 100 feet (30 m) from the shore and a 0.25 nautical miles (460 m) downstream.
Lady Elizabeth	Western Australia	The ship was wrecked on Rottnest Island. All on board were rescued.
Madagascar	United Kingdom	The ship was sighted whilst on a voyage from Glasgow, Renfrewshire to Callao, Peru. No further trace, reported missing.

== 3 July ==
List of shipwrecks: 3 July 1878
Ship	State	Description
Ferndale	United Kingdom	The steamship was driven ashore at the Coalhouse Fort, Essex. She was on a voyage from South Shields, County Durham to London.
Record	United Kingdom	The barque ran aground at Ceará, Brazil and was severely damaged. She was on a voyage from Liverpool, Lancashire to Ceará. She was refloated but was consequently condemned.

== 4 July ==
List of shipwrecks: 4 July 1878
Ship	State	Description
Cosmopollis	Canada	The ship was driven ashore in the Satten Islands, Cape Horn, Chile during a snow storm and gale. The crew was stranded on the island for twenty-two days and were taken off by the barque, Bacalan France.
Patriot	United Kingdom	The brig was beached at Harwich, Essex. She was on a voyage from Newcastle upon Tyne, Northumberland to Schiedam, South Holland, Netherlands.
Rheidol	United Kingdom	The schooner was driven ashore at Umago, Austria-Hungary. She was on a voyage from Neath, Glamorgan to Trieste.
Stratford	United Kingdom	The full-rigged ship departed from Dundee, Forfarshire for Bombay, British Raj. No further trace, presumed foundered with the loss of all 25 or 30 crew.
Victoria	New Zealand	The 23-ton cutter foundered in the Hauraki Gulf during a storm.

== 5 July ==
List of shipwrecks: 5 July 1878
Ship	State	Description
George and Elizabeth	United Kingdom	The brig foundered off the Haisborough Sands, in the North Sea off the coast of Norfolk. Her crew were rescued. She was on a voyage from Sunderland, County Durham to Caen, Calvados, France.
Ionian Belle	United Kingdom	The brigantine sprang a leak and foundered off Cape St. Vincent, Portugal. Her crew were rescued by the steamship Burlington (United Kingdom). Ionian Belle was on a voyage from Cádiz, Spain to the Newfoundland Colony.
Johann	Russia	The steamship suffered a boiler explosion and sank in the Volga with the loss of 50 lives. She was racing the steamship Genardi-Ratkoff-Rojnoff (Russia) at the time.
Oronoco	United States	The schooner was lost on Straitsmouth Island off Rockport, Massachusetts. Her crew were rescued.

== 6 July ==
List of shipwrecks: 6 July 1878
Ship	State	Description
Egbert	United Kingdom	The steamship ran aground in the River Avon. She was on a voyage from Odesa, Russia to Bristol, Gloucestershire. She was refloated with the assistance of five tugs and taken in to Bristol.
Grant	Norway	The barque was run into by Queen Victoria (United Kingdom) in the Samphire Roads, off the coast of County Kerry, United Kingdom and was severely damaged.

== 7 July ==
List of shipwrecks: 7 July 1878
Ship	State	Description
Druid	United Kingdom	The ship ran aground at Sunderland, County Durham. She was on a voyage from London to Sunderland. She was refloated and taken in to Sunderland.
Trimdon	United Kingdom	The steamship ran aground in Besika Bay. She was on a voyage from Sulina, United Principalities to Malta.

== 8 July ==
List of shipwrecks: 8 July 1878
Ship	State	Description
Betsey	United Kingdom	The schooner ran aground on the Shrape Bank, off the Isle of Wight. She was on a voyage from Fredrikstad, Norway to Port Madoc, Caernarfonshire. She was refloated and resumed her voyage.
Druid	United Kingdom	The steamship sank at Sunderland, County Durham. She was on a voyage from London to Sunderland. She was refloated.
Italia	Italy	The ship foundered in the Gulf of Lyon. She was on a voyage from Livorno to Lisbon, Portugal.
Pearl	United Kingdom	The tug was run into by the steamship Fusilier (United Kingdom) at Leith, Lothian and was severely damaged.
Presto	United Kingdom	The barque was abandoned in the Atlantic Ocean. Her crew were rescued by Skibladner (Norway). Presto was on a voyage from Miramichi, New Brunswick, Canada to Belfast, County Antrim.

== 9 July ==
List of shipwrecks: 9 July 1878
Ship	State	Description
Alfonso	Spain	The schooner was driven ashore. She was on a voyage from St. Jago de Cuba, Cuba to Vigo. She was refloated and taken in to Fortune Island, Bahamas in a leaky condition. She was placed under repair.
County of Cromarty	United Kingdom	The full-rigged ship was driven ashore at "Albarado", Brazil. She was abandoned as a total loss.
Kremlin	United States	The brig collided with the steamship Golden Grove (United Kingdom) and sank with the loss of two lives. Kremlin was on a voyage from Cienfuegos, Cuba to Boston, Massachusetts and/or New York.

== 10 July ==
List of shipwrecks: 10 July 1878
Ship	State	Description
Bertha	United Kingdom	The ship ran aground at Philadelphia, Pennsylvania, United States. She was on a voyage from Philadelphia to Glasgow, Renfrewshire. She was refloated and resumed her voyage.
Harlequin	United Kingdom	The barque ran aground on the Carkena Shoals, off the coast of the Beylik of Tunis. She was refloated.
Marguerite Zolonide	United Kingdom	The ship foundered in the Atlantic Ocean 16 nautical miles (30 km) north east of Trevose Head, Cornwall. Her crew survived She was on a voyage from Middlesbrough, Yorkshire to Newport, Monmouthshire.
Sharon's Rose	United Kingdom	The ship ran aground on the Krantz Sand, in the North Sea. She was on a voyage from Hartlepool, County Durham to Freiburg, Germany. She was refloated with the assistance of a tug and resumed her voyage.

== 11 July ==
List of shipwrecks: 11 July 1878
Ship	State	Description
Armyn	United Kingdom	The ketch was run into and sunk off Dungeness, Kent by the steamship Beaconsfield. Her crew were rescued. Armyn was on a voyage from London to Falmouth, Cornwall.
Felix Henry	United Kingdom	The ship was driven ashore and wrecked at Blakeney, Norfolk.
Ionian Belle	United Kingdom	The brigantine foundered 1 nautical mile (1.9 km) north east by north of Cape St. Vincent, Portugal. Her crew survived. She was on a voyage from Cádiz, Spain to Aberystwyth, Cardiganshire.
Luzon	United Kingdom	The barque was wrecked on Le Morne Brabant, Mauritius with the loss of two of her eight crew. Survivors took to the captain's gig the next day and were rescued on 14 July by Barentin (Flag unknown). Toe of them subsequently died. Luzon was on a voyage from Java, Netherlands East Indies to Falmouth, Cornwall.
Retbina	Canada	The brig foundered in the Atlantic Ocean 25 nautical miles (46 km) west of Cape Clear Island, County Cork, United Kingdom. Her crew survived. She was on a voyage from Clonakilty, County Cork to Bath, Maine, United States.
Svend	Denmark	The steamship ran aground off Burntisland, Fife, United Kingdom.
Wallachia	United Kingdom	The steamship struck a sunken wreck off "Azimoor" and was damaged. She was abandoned the next day and foundered. Her crew were rescued. She was on a voyage from Galați, Principality of Romania, to Safi, Morocco.

== 12 July ==
List of shipwrecks: 12 July 1878
Ship	State	Description
Dreamland	United Kingdom	The schooner was sighted off the coast of Renfrewshire whilst on her maiden voyage, from Glasgow, Renfrewshire to Málaga, Spain. No further trace, reported missing with her six crew.
Dispatch, and unnamed ferry	United Kingdom; France	The steamship Dispatch collided with a ferry at Saint-Malo, Ille-et-Vilaine. The ferry was cut in two and sank. All on board, about 40 people, were rescued. Dispatch was on a voyage from Saint-Malo to Saint Peter Port, Guernsey, Channel Islands. She was holed at the bow and put back to Saint-Malo.
K. C. Rankin	United States	The schooner was wrecked on Saona Point, Saint Domingo. Her crew survived but the vessel was plundered and wrecked by the local inhabitants.
Lilian Gertrude	United States	The schooner was lost on Mount Desert Rock. Her crew were rescued.
Zelina	United Kingdom	The steamship arrived at Genoa, Italy on fire. The fire was extinguished. She was on a voyage from Liverpool, Lancashire to Genoa.
Unnamed	United Kingdom	The pilot boat foundered off Toe Head, Ireland with the loss of ten lives.
Unnamed	Russia	The overcrowded passenger vessel foundered in Lake Onega with the loss of 40 lives.

== 13 July ==
List of shipwrecks: 13 July 1878
Ship	State	Description
Admiral	United Kingdom	The fishing smack foundered in the North Sea off Southwold, Suffolk. Her crew were rescued.
Hyperion	United Kingdom	The schooner ran aground on the Nore. She was on a voyage from London to Newcastle upon Tyne, Northumberland. She was refloated.
Scottish Admiral	United Kingdom	The barque ran aground on the Maplin Sands, in the North Sea off the coast of Essex. She was on her maiden voyage, from London to Brisbane, Queensland. She was refloated on 17 July and put back to London.
Swift	United Kingdom	The fishing smack foundered in the North Sea off Southwold, Suffolk. Her crew were rescued.
Swift	United Kingdom	The smack foundered between the Black Head and the Maiden Head, County Antrim with the loss of all three crew.
Wastdale	United Kingdom	The steamship ran aground off Brixton, Isle of Wight. She was on a voyage from Algiers, Algeria to Dunkirk, Nord, France.

== 14 July ==
List of shipwrecks: 14 July 1878
Ship	State	Description
Hilda	United Kingdom	The pilot coble sank off Whitby, Yorkshire with the loss of one of the two people on board.
Unnamed	United Kingdom	The schooner foundered in the Firth of Clyde 15 nautical miles (28 km) south west of Ailsa Craig.

== 15 July ==
List of shipwrecks: 15 July 1878
Ship	State	Description
Friga	United Kingdom	The ship was driven ashore at Manicouagan, Quebec, Canada. She was on a voyage from Quebec City to Liverpool, Lancashire. She was later refloated and put back to Quebec City.
Joven Eustaquia	Spain	The brigantine caught fire and was beached at Cape Spartel, Morocco. Her crew were rescued. She was on a voyage from Cardiff, Glamorgan, United Kingdom to Tarragona. She was a total loss.
Lady Neave	United Kingdom	The schooner ran aground on the Kentish Knock. She was refloated with the assistance of a smack.
Savelaw	United Kingdom	The ship ran aground in the Saint Lawrence River. She was on a voyage from Quebec City to London. She was refloated and resumed her voyage.
Sorridderen	Norway	The barque was driven ashore at Richmond, Virginia, United States. She was on a voyage from Richmond to Liverpool.

== 16 July ==
List of shipwrecks: 16 July 1878
Ship	State	Description
Annie	United Kingdom	The steamship ran aground in the Danube 36 nautical miles (67 km) from its mouth.
Brotherly Love	United Kingdom	The brig was run into by barque Ethelbert (United Kingdom) at Cuxhaven, Germany and sank. Her crew were rescued.
Concordia	Norway	The barque struck a rock and sank off Glass Island, off the Isle of Lewis, Outer Hebrides, United Kingdom. Her crew were rescued. She was on a voyage from Liverpool, Lancashire, United Kingdom to Kronstadt, Russia. She refloated when her cargo of salt dissolved, and was towed in to Scalpa, Isle of Harris for temporary repairs. She was taken in to Stornoway in early August in a severely leaky condition.
Galatea	Germany	The steamship ran aground in the Suez Canal.
Harriet Agnes	United Kingdom	The steamship struck the wreck of Chilwell Hall (United Kingdom) and was beached at Sagres, Portugal. She was on a voyage from London to Malta. She was reported to have become a wreck by 20 July, but was refloated on 29 July and towed in to Lisbon, Portugal where she was repaired.
Lumsden	United Kingdom	The steamship ran aground and was wrecked at Thyboroøn, Denmark. All on board were rescued. She was on a voyage from Hull, Yorkshire to Saint Petersburg, Russia.
Marie Fanny	United Kingdom	The steamship collided with the tug Don (United Kingdom) and was beached at Sunderland, County Durham.

== 17 July ==
List of shipwrecks: 17 July 1878
Ship	State	Description
Europa, and Staffa	United Kingdom	The steamship Europa collided with the steamship Staffa and sank near Ferrol, Spain. All on board were rescued by Staffa and a schooner. Europa was on a voyage from Gibraltar to Liverpool, Lancashire. Staffa was severely damaged. She was on a voyage from Newcastle upon Tyne, Northumberland to Málaga, Spain.
Malta	United Kingdom	The ship ran aground off Goeree, Zeeland, Netherlands and was wrecked. Her crew were rescued. She was on a voyage from Newcastle upon Tyne, Northumberland to Rotterdam, South Holland, Netherlands.
Propontis	United Kingdom	The steamship ran aground off Gallipoli, Ottoman Empire.

== 19 July ==
List of shipwrecks: 19 July 1878
Ship	State	Description
G. A. Pike	United Kingdom	The brigantine was run down and sunk by the steamship Adriatic (United Kingdom) with the loss of five of her six crew. G. A. Pyke was on a voyage from Gravesend, Kent to Dublin.
Leonidas	Greece	The brig ran aground on the Monscian Reef, off Malta. She was on a voyage from Malta to Cork or Falmouth, Cornwall, United Kingdom. She was refloated with assistance and put back to Malta in a leaky condition.
Maiden City	New Zealand	The 27-ton schooner was deliberately run aground near Wanganui after springing a leak, but became submerged after settling deeply in the sand.
Nelson	United Kingdom	The steamship was driven ashore 8 nautical miles (15 km) south of Brindisi, Italy. She was on a voyage from Newcastle upon Tyne, Northumberland to Brindisi. She was refloated with assistance from the steamship Aquila Imperiale (Austria-Hungary) and taken in to Brindisi.
Ocean Traveller	United Kingdom	The ship was wrecked on the Isla de Aves, Venezuela. Her crew were rescued. She was on a voyage from Barbados to Curaçao, Curaçao and Dependencies.
Trio	(Russian Empire) Grand Duchy of Finland	The ship was run down and sunk off Falsterbo, Sweden by Castor (Flag unknown). Her crew were rescued.

== 20 July ==
List of shipwrecks: 20 July 1878
Ship	State	Description
HMS Bustard	Royal Navy	The Albacore-class gunboat suffered a boiler explosion off Portland, Dorset with the loss of a crew member.
Eller Bank	United Kingdom	The ship ran aground at Adelaide, South Australia. She was on a voyage from Liverpool, Lancashire to Adelaide. She was refloated.
Esperance	Germany	The barque collided with a French schooner off Falsterbo, Sweden and was severely damaged. She was on a voyage from Saint Petersburg, Russia to Copenhagen, Denmark. She was towed in to Copenhagen by the steamship Lily Dale (United Kingdom).

== 21 July ==
List of shipwrecks: 21 July 1878
Ship	State	Description
Cambria	United Kingdom	The smack foundered in Bardsey Sound. She was on a voyage from Port Madoc, Caernarfonshire to Belfast, County Antrim.
Glentruim	United Kingdom	The steamship ran aground at the Isle of May, Fife. She was on a voyage from Dundee, Forfarshire to Burntisland, Fife. She floated off and put back to Dundee in a severely leaky condition.
Hilda	United Kingdom	The steamship ran aground at the mouth of the River Tees and was severely damaged.
Susanne Dixon	United Kingdom	The brig was driven ashore at Whitburn, County Durham. She was refloated the next day.
Svendre Brodre	Norway	The ship was wrecked at Lemvig, Denmark. Her crew were rescued. She was on a voyage from Ipswich, Suffolk to Laurvig.
Zeepaard	Netherlands	The ship was wrecked at Lemvig. Her crew were rescued. She was on a voyage from Amsterdam, South Holland to a Baltic port.

== 22 July ==
List of shipwrecks: 22 July 1878
Ship	State	Description
Anna	Norway	The brig was run down and sunk by a steamship 7 nautical miles (13 km) west three quarters south of Brest, Finistère, France with the loss of three of her five crew. Survivors were rescued by the brig Ceres (Norway). Anna was on a voyage from Santander, Spain to Newcastle upon Tyne, Northumberland, United Kingdom.
Bevington	United Kingdom	The steamship was driven ashore at Tynemouth, Northumberland. She was refloated with the assistance of a tug.
Dresden	United Kingdom	The steamship struck the South Carr Rock. She was on a voyage from Stettin to Leith, Lothian, United Kingdom. She was refloated and taken in to Leith.
Ergo	(Russian Empire) Grand Duchy of Finland	The barque ran aground on "Fillinge". She was refloated.
Glentrium	United Kingdom	The steamship struck rocks at the Isle of May. She was on a voyage from Dundee, Forfarshire to Burntisland, Fife. She was refloated and put back to Dundee in a severely leaky condition.
Lake Megantic	United Kingdom	The steamship was driven ashore at Otter River Point, Anticosti Island, Nova Scotia, Canada. All on board survived. She was consequently condemned.
Mercator	United Kingdom	The ship was driven ashore and wrecked at Natal, Brazil. Her crew were rescued.
Secret	United Kingdom	The fishing dandy collided with the steamship Northumberland (United Kingdom) and foundered off Dimlington, Yorkshire.
Tvendre Brodre	Denmark	The ship was wrecked at Lemvig. She was on a voyage from Lemvig to Ipswich, Suffolk, United Kingdom.

== 23 July ==
List of shipwrecks: 23 July 1878
Ship	State	Description
Dispatch	United Kingdom	The smack sprang a leak and foundered off Cardigan Head. Her crew survived. She was on a voyage from Aberdovey, Cardiganshire to Portsmouth, Hampshire.
Eleanor	United Kingdom	The ship ran aground on The Shingles, off the Isle of Wight. She was on a voyage from Nefyn, Caernarfonshire to Southampton, Hampshire.
Helen Christine	United Kingdom	The steam yacht ran ashore near Berry Head, Devon.
Meta	Norway	The steamship ran aground in the Douro.
Ranneys	United Kingdom	The ship ran aground off St Mary's, Isles of Scilly. She was refloated the next day.
Sylphiden	Netherlands	The schooner ran aground on the Lillegrunden, in the Great Belt. She was on a voyage from Libava, Courland Governorate to Schiedam, South Holland. She was refloated with assistance.
Triumph	United Kingdom	The brig ran aground on the Heeps, in the Thames Estuary. She was on a voyage from Seaham, County Durham to London. She was refloated, and was towed in to Gravesend, Kent, where she arrived in a waterlogged condition.
Willing Mind	United Kingdom	The ship foundered in the North Sea off Kettleness, Yorkshire with the loss of her captain. She was on a voyage from West Hartlepool, County Durham to Whitby, Yorkshire.

== 24 July ==
List of shipwrecks: 24 July 1878
Ship	State	Description
Anna Lucretia	Netherlands	The barque was driven ashore at Narva, Russia. Her crew were rescued by the Narva Lifeboat.
Carl Georg	Germany	The barque was driven ashore at Narva. Her crew were rescued by the Narva Lifeboat. She was on a voyage from Charleston, South Carolina, United States to Narva.
G. W. Wakeford	United Kingdom	The brigantine ran aground in the Pará River. She was on a voyage from Philadelphia, Pennsylvania, United States to Pará, Brazil.
Hollandia	United Kingdom	The steamship ran aground in Waterford Cove. She was on a voyage from Waterford to Liverpool, Lancashire.
James Service	Victoria	The barque was wrecked on reefs approximately 7 nautical miles (13 km) off the Murray River, Western Australia with the loss of all of her crew and 10 passengers. She was bound from Calcutta, India to Melbourne carrying sacks, castor oil and jute.

== 25 July ==
List of shipwrecks: 25 July 1878
Ship	State	Description
Better Luck Still	United Kingdom	The fishing smack ran aground on Rock Angus, at the entrance to the Belfast Lough.
Emma	Norway	The brig was driven ashore at Merlimont, Pas-de-Calais, France. She was on a voyage from Dieppe, Seine-Inférieure, France to Laurvig.
Grahams	United Kingdom	The schooner foundered in the Baltic Sea 25 nautical miles (46 km) east of Gotland, Sweden. Her crew were rescued.
Juliet	United Kingdom	The ship was wrecked on the Isla de lost Estados, Argentina with the loss of her captain. She was on a voyage from London to San Francisco, California, United States.
Lancaster	United Kingdom	The schooner was driven ashore at Boarhills, Fife. She was refloated.
Peerless	United States	The schooner ran aground on Crow's Shoal. Her crew of three were rescued by the United States Life Saving Service.

== 26 July ==
List of shipwrecks: 26 July 1878
Ship	State	Description
Bride	(United Kingdom of Great Britain and Ireland) Isle of Man	The schooner ran aground in the Sound of Mull. She was on a voyage from Runcorn, Cheshire to Wick, Caithness.
Harmony	Sweden	The brig ran aground on the Ooster Bank, in the North Sea off the coast of Zeeland, Netherlands and was wrecked. She was on a voyage from "Enflewick" to Antwerp, Belgium.
'Imogene Diverty'	United States	The schooner ran aground on the South Bar, Cold Spring Inlet and sank in a gale. Her crew of four were rescued by the United States Life Saving Service.
Pride	(United Kingdom of Great Britain and Ireland) Isle of Man	The schooner ran aground in the Sound of Mull. She was on a voyage from Runcorn, Cheshire to Wick, Caithness.
Ranneys	United Kingdom	The ship ran aground off St. Mary's, Isles of Scilly. She was refloated the next day.

== 27 July ==
List of shipwrecks: 27 July 1878
Ship	State	Description
Foam	United Kingdom	The steamship ran aground at Dover, Kent. She was on a voyage from Rotterdam, South Holland, Netherlands to Dover. She was refloated and taken in to Dover.
Mercury	United Kingdom	The steamer sprung a leak in heavy weather 8 miles (13 km) off Cape Bon, Algeria. She foundered in the Mediterranean Sea just off the Cape. Her crew was rescued by John Dixon (United Kingdom), except one who tried to swim to shore from a lifeboat that had been left behind earlier. Mercury was on a voyage from Sulina, United Principalities to Sligo.

== 28 July ==
List of shipwrecks: 28 July 1878
Ship	State	Description
Colombia	United Kingdom	The steamship ran aground on a rock off Santa Elena, Ecuador and was severely damaged. She was on a voyage from Panama City, United States of Colombia to Callao, Peru. She was refloated with assistance.
Dispatch	United Kingdom	The sloop capsized in Cardigan Bay. Her three crew were rescued.
Jagone	Italy	The barque was wrecked at Nantucket, Massachusetts, United States. Her crew were rescued. She was on a voyage from the Mediterranean to Boston, Massachusetts.
Lena Thurlow	United States	The brig collided with Warren Hastings (United Kingdom) and sank off the Grand Banks of Newfoundland. Her crew were rescued by Warren Hastings. Lena Thurlow was on a voyage from Dover to Cow Bay, Nova Scotia, Canada.
Mercury	United Kingdom	The steamship may have foundered when she sprung a leak near the island of Zembra, Beylik of Tunis. One crew member drowned and the fate of the rest of the people on board is unknown. She was on a voyage from Izmail, Russia to Sligo with maize.

== 29 July ==
List of shipwrecks: 29 July 1878
Ship	State	Description
Abydos, and Dunstanborough	United Kingdom	The steamships collided at Hellevoetsluis, Zeeland, Netherlands and were both severely damaged. Abydos was on a voyage from Odesa, Russia to Schiedam, South Holland, Netherlands. Dunstanborough was on a voyage from Kronstadt, Russia to Rotterdam, South Holland.
Cvice	Straits Settlements	The ship was lost off "Passengan". Her crew survived.
Haabets Anker	Norway	The brig foundered in the Atlantic Ocean. Her ten crew were rescued by the barque Lady Head (United Kingdom). Haabets Anker was on a voyage from Huelva, Spain to Hamburg, Germany.
John	United Kingdom	The schooner collided with the brig Thyra in the River Mersey and was beached.

== 30 July ==
List of shipwrecks: 30 July 1878
Ship	State	Description
Dos Cunados	Flag unknown	The ship was driven ashore at Wilmington, Delaware, United States. She was on a voyage from Wilmington to Antwerp, Belgium. She was refloated and towed in to Wilmington in a severely leaky condition.

== 31 July ==
List of shipwrecks: 31 July 1878
Ship	State	Description
Eunice	United Kingdom	The steamship ran aground and was damaged. She was on a voyage from the River Tyne to Rouen, Seine-Inférieure, France. She was refloated and put in to Sunderland, County Durham.
Harlaw	United Kingdom	The full-rigged ship sank off Shanghai, China with the loss of ten of her crew. She was on a voyage from Sydney, New South Wales to Shanghai.
Lenore	United Kingdom	The barque ran aground off Belitung, Netherlands East Indies. Her crew were rescued. She was on a voyage from Singapore, Straits Settlements to Marseille, Bouches-du-Rhône, France. She was consequently condemned.
Louise	United Kingdom	The steamship was driven ashore north of Trondheim.

== Unknown date ==
List of shipwrecks: Unknown date in July 1878
Ship	State	Description
Ben Nevis	United Kingdom	The barque was driven ashore and wrecked at Folly Point, Jamaica. She was on a voyage from Old Harbour, Jamaica to Liverpool, Lancashire.
Cairngorm	United Kingdom	The ship ran aground at Lindisfarne. She was refloated with assistance from the paddle tug Grace Darling (United Kingdom) and towed in to Lindisfarne.
Caledonian	United Kingdom	The barque was wrecked in Table Bay between 18 and 24 July with the loss of four of her crew. She was on a voyage from Cardiff, Glamorgan to Java, Netherlands East Indies.
Circe	United Kingdom	The steamship was lost off Sumatra, Netherlands East Indies. Her crew were rescued.
Colibri	Italy	The brig was damaged by fire at sea before 10 July. She was on a voyage from Rockhampton, Maine, United States to London, United Kingdom. .
Derwent	United Kingdom	The steamship ran aground at "Crane Island", Canada. She was on a voyage from Cardiff, Glamorgan to Montreal, Quebec, Canada. She was refloated and taken in to Quebec City, Canada in a leaky condition. Subsequently repaired.
Emperor	United Kingdom	The barque was lost in the Riau Strait. Her crew were rescued.
Etta Loring	United States	The barque was wrecked in Table Bay between 18 and 24 July. She was on a voyage from Philadelphia, Pennsylvania to Yokohama, Japan.
Giulio D.	Italy	The barque was wrecked at Nantucket, Massachusetts, United States. Her crew were rescued. She was on a voyage from a Mediterranean port to Boston, Massachusetts.
Glamis Castle	United Kingdom	The steamship ran aground at Singapore, Straits Settlements. She was on a voyage from China to New York, United States. She was refloated.
Glenericht	United Kingdom	The ship caught fire at sea and was abandoned before 22 July.
Glenrosa	United Kingdom	The steamship was driven ashore on Gotland, Sweden. She was refloated and towed in to Riga, Russia, where she arrived on 17 July for repairs.
Harmonides	United Kingdom	The ship was driven ashore at "Gulliver's Hole", near Digby, Nova Scotia, Canada. She was on a voyage from Havre de Grâce, Seine-Inférieure, France to Saint John, New Brunswick, Canada. She was a total loss.
Jean	United Kingdom	The brigantine was wrecked in Table Bay between 18 and 24 July. She was on a voyage from Cape Town to Mossel Bay.
Lady Allan	United Kingdom	The ship was abandoned in the Indian Ocean before 28 July. Her crew were rescued by Onward (United Kingdom). Lady Allen was on a voyage from Moulmein, Burma to Queenstown, County Cork.
Lady Elma Bruce	United Kingdom	The barque was abandoned at sea before 26 July. Her crew were rescued. She was on a voyage from Cardiff, Glamorgan to the Cape of Good Hope, Cape Colony.
Mabel Clark	United States	The ship was wrecked on Tristan da Cunha before 5 July. She was on a voyage from Liverpool to Hong Kong.
Madura	France	The ship was wrecked in the Indian Ocean. Her crew were rescued. She was on a voyage from Colombo, Ceylon to Havre de Grâce, Seine-Inférieure.
Mary H. Hand	United States	The ship was abandoned in the Atlantic Ocean before 15 July.
Merak No. 3	Netherlands	The dredger was driven ashore and wrecked at Galle, Ceylon.
Mercury	United Kingdom	The steamship foundered at sea. Her crew were rescued by the steamship John Dixon (United Kingdom). Mercury was on a voyage from Sulina, United Principalities to Gibraltar.
Nellie C. Foster	United States	The ship foundered before 5 July. Her crew were rescued by the steamship Circassian (United Kingdom).
Neree	France	The barque was driven ashore and severely damaged in Table Bay. She was on a voyage from Réunion to Marseille, Bouches-du-Rhône.
Palestine	Canada	The barque was wrecked in the Abaco Islands before 18 July with the loss of ten of her crew She was on a voyage from Portland, Maine to Havana, Cuba.
Paolina V	Italy	The ship was abandoned in Netherlands East Indies waters. Her crew were rescued. She was on a voyage from Sourabay, Netherlands East Indies to the English Channel.
Queen	United Kingdom	The barque foundered off the coast of the Spanish East Indies. She was on a voyage from Singapore to the Pellew Islands, South Australia. Her crew took to three boats. One boat with nine crew aboard was reported missing.
Redbreast	United Kingdom	The barque was wrecked in Table Bay between 18 and 24 July.
Rhoda	United Kingdom	The barque was driven ashore and wrecked at "Dejekkan", near "Bawakan", Netherlands East Indies. She was on a voyage from Makassar, Netherlands East Indies to Singapore, Straits Settlements.
Ruby	United Kingdom	The ship ran aground in the Saint Lawrence River. She was on a voyage from Quebec City, Canada to Belfast, County Antrim. She was refloated and resumed her voyage.
Sainte Philomene	France	The brig struck a sunken wreck and was damaged. She put in to São Miguel Island, Azores in a leaky condition on 22 July.
Sumatra	United Kingdom	The steamship was driven ashore 6 nautical miles (11 km) south of Brindisi, Italy. Her passengers were taken off. She was on a voyage from Bombay, India to a British port.
Sydenham	United Kingdom	The ship departed from London for Hong Kong in mid-July. She subsequently collided with Sarah Nicholson (United Kingdom) in the Ombai Strait but was reported to have sustained minor damage. No further trace, reported missing.
Tangier	United Kingdom	The ship was lost at sea. Her crew were rescued. She was on a voyage from Arkhangelsk, Russia to West Hartlepool, County Durham.
Westborough	United Kingdom	The ship was wrecked "in the Bottin" before 10 July. Her crew were rescued. She was on a voyage from Nederkalix, Sweden to Hull, Yorkshire.
