= List of islands of Jamaica =

List of islands of the island nation of Jamaica

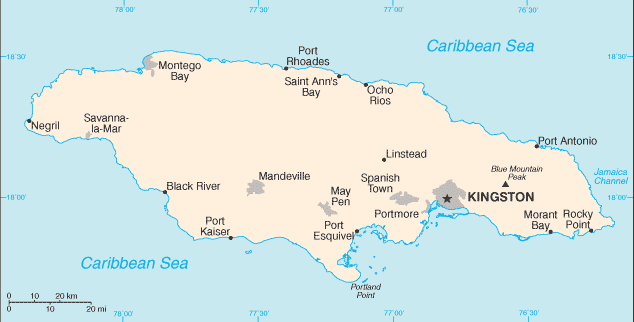
Jamaica

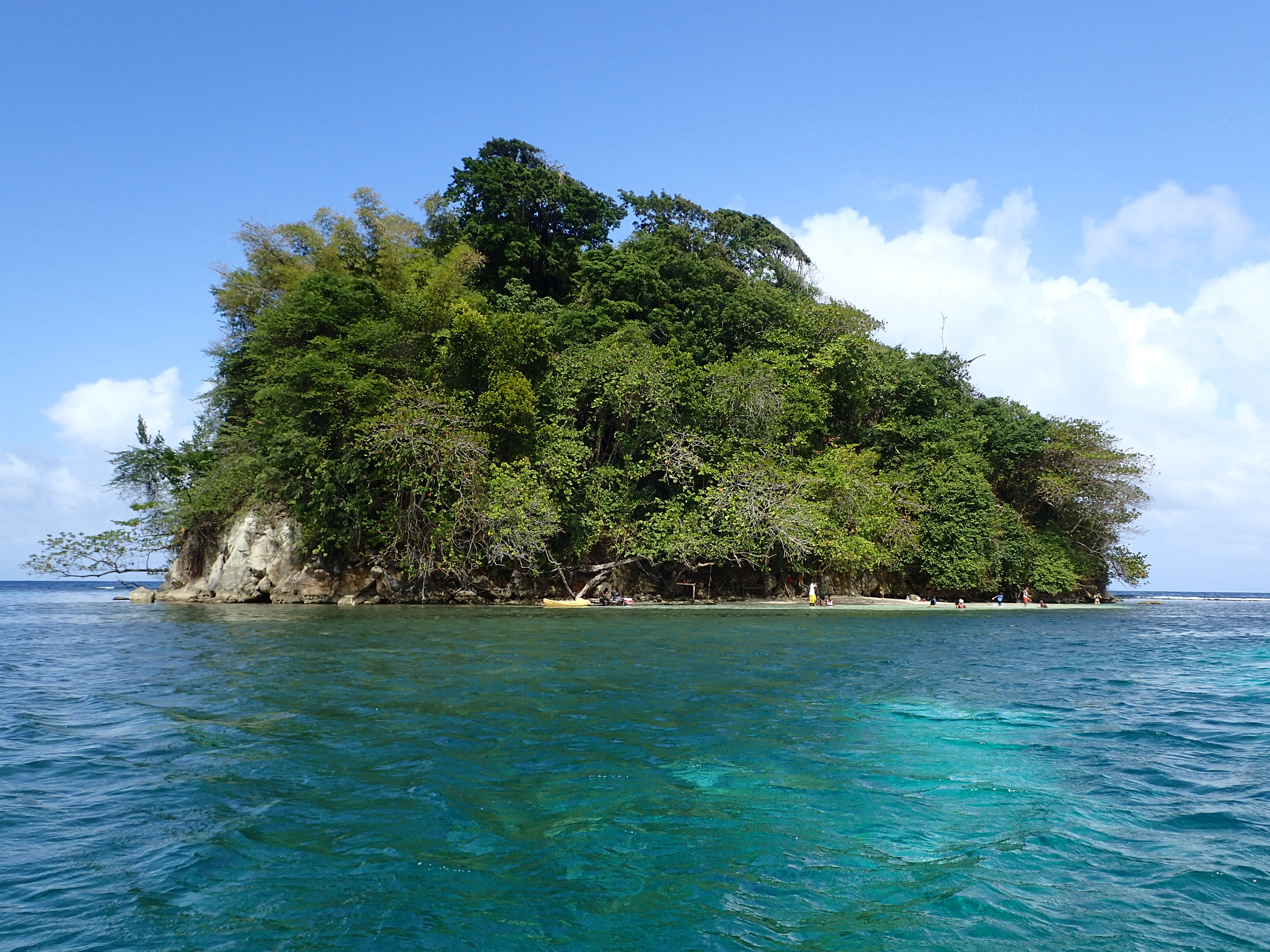
Pellen Island

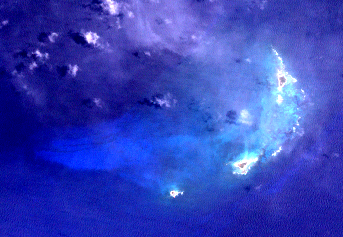
Morant Cays

This is a list of islands of Jamaica. There are about 49 islands in the island nation of Jamaica. All islands are in the Caribbean Sea. The island of Jamaica has an area of 10,990 km^{2} (4,240 sq mi) and is the third largest island in the Caribbean, after Cuba and Hispaniola.

== Islands ==
The islands of the country of Jamaica include:

- Bajo Nuevo Bank (uninhabited), 18°00′00″N 78°05′00″W
- Bare Bush Cay, 17°45′21″N 77°01′54″W
- Big Half-Moon Cay, 17°44′09″N 77°05′12″W
- Big Pelican Island, 17°48′02″N 77°00′56″W
- Big Portland Cay, 17°42′38″N 77°06′34″W
- Blake Cay
- Blower Rock, 17°02′00″N 77°31′00″W
- Bogue Islands (Bog Islands), 18°27′09″N 77°56′50″W
- Bolt Cay
- Booby Cay, 18°20′17″N 78°20′52″W
  - Booby Cay - Negril
  - Booby Cay - Pedro Cays
  - Booby Cay - Pedro Cays
  - Booby Cay - Morant Cays
- Bush Cay, 18°29′25″N 77°38′29″W
- Bushy Cay
- Cabarita Island, 18°22′27″N 76°53′04″W
- Careening Cay, 17°52′54″N 77°05′03″W
- Christmas Island
- Dolphin Island, 17°47′33″N 77°09′56″W
- Drunken Man's Cay
- East Crall
- Emerald Island, 17°52′04″N 76°18′42″W
- Fort Island, 17°52′00″N 76°20′00″W
- Gordon Cay
- Great Goat Island, 17°52′13″N 77°03′03″W
- Green Cay
- Green Island, 18°24′00″N 78°17′00″W
- Gun Cay, 17°55′49″N 76°50′08″W
- Hogsty Cay, 17°52′00″N 76°18′00″W
- Jamaica, 18°10′38″N 77°22′16″W
- Lilyroot Cay, 17°52′00″N 76°19′00″W
- Lime Cay, 17°55′06″N 76°49′11″W
- Little Goat Island, 17°53′07″N 77°04′02″W
- Little Half-Moon Cay, 17°44′24″N 77°04′44″W
- Little Pelican Island, 17°48′21″N 77°01′12″W
- Little Portland Cay
- Long Island, 17°50′51″N 77°08′52″W
- Maiden Cay, 17°54′32″N 76°48′38″W
- Man O' War Cays
- Mango Cay, 17°52′00″N 76°20′00″W
- Mid Crall
- Middle Cay, 17°01′00″N 77°47′00″W
- Morant Cays, 17°24′00″N 75°59′00″W
- Morant Bank
- Navy Island, 18°11′13″N 76°27′10″W
- Needles
- Northeast Cay - Morant Cays, 17°25′00″N 75°59′00″W
- Northeast Cay - Pedro Cays, 17°03′00″N 77°46′00″W
- One Tree Island
- Pedro Bank, 17°00′00″N 77°50′00″W
- Pelican Cay
- Pellen Island (Pellew Island or Monkey Island), 18°10′30″N 76°23′26″W
- Pigeon Island, 17°47′48″N 77°04′29″W
- Portland Rock, 17°06′N 77°27′W
- Rackhams Cay, 17°55′32″N 76°50′19″W
- Refuge Cay, 17°56′46″N 76°49′17″W
- Rocky Cay
- Salt Island, 17°49′49″N 77°08′17″W
- Sandbank Cay
- Sandals Royal Caribbean Resort & Offshore Island (Sandals Cay), 18°30′01″N 77°55′23″W
- Santamaria Island, 18°24′35″N 76°56′50″W
- Sapphire Island
- Short Island
- South Cay, 17°53′12″N 76°50′09″W, 16°57′00″N 77°50′00″W
- Southeast Cay - Port Royal Cays (uninhabited), 17°53′50″N 76°48′03″W
- Southeast Cay - Morant Cays
- Southwest Cay - Pedro Cays
- Southwest Rock
- Tern Cay, 17°49′47″N 76°59′26″W
- West Crall
- Woods Island, 18°11′19″N 76°26′21″W

== See also ==
- List of Caribbean islands
- Geology of Jamaica
