= Portland Lighthouse =

Lighthouse in Jamaica

- Location: Portland Point; Clarendon; Jamaica
- Coordinates: 17.7423411°N 77.1576047°W

Tower
- Construction: steel skeletal tower
- Height: 35 metres (115 ft)
- Shape: square tower with balcony and lantern
- Markings: red and white tower, red lantern and gallery

Light
- First lit: unknown
- Focal height: 198 metres (650 ft)
- Characteristic: Fl (2) W 15s.

Portland Cottage light structure formerly Portland Lighthouse sometimes Portland Point Lighthouse is situated on the summit of Portland Ridge, Clarendon, near the southernmost part of Jamaica.

The tower is an open-framed, square, tapered steel structure with lantern and gallery, the highest in the Island, at a height of 145 feet (44 m) (129 iron steps). It has a white revolving light, giving two flashes in quick succession every 15 seconds.

The lighthouse is maintained by the Port Authority of Jamaica, an agency of the Ministry of Transport and Works.

== See also ==
- List of lighthouses in Jamaica
