= Lazaretto Cairn Lighthouse =

Lazaretto Cairn Lighthouse Rackhams Cay Range Rear
- Location: Portmore; St Catherine; Jamaica
- Coordinates: 17.936031°N 76.873970°W

Tower
- Foundation: masonry basement
- Construction: masonry tower
- Height: 30 feet (9.1 m) approx.
- Shape: solid triangular pyramidal tower
- Markings: white towerr

Light
- First lit: unknown
- Focal height: 92 feet (28 m)
- Characteristic: Fl W 3s.

Lazaretto Cairn Lighthouse guides vessels westward on their approach to Kingston Harbour. It appears to be a historic daybeacon converted to a lighted aid. It is located on a bluff on the west side of the harbour entrance, opposite Port Royal. It provides the rear light of the Rackhams Cay Range. Its ground is maintained by the Port Authority of Jamaica, an agency of the Ministry of Transport and Works.

== See also ==
- List of lighthouses in Jamaica
