= Morant Cays Lighthouse =

- Location: Breezy Point; Morant Cays; Jamaica
- Coordinates: 17.415559°N 75.972068°W

Tower
- Constructed: 1960
- Construction: metal tower
- Height: 21 metres (69 ft)
- Shape: tapered cylindrical tower with light
- Markings: tower painted with black and white horizontal bands

Light
- First lit: 1960s
- Focal height: 23 metres (75 ft)
- Characteristic: L Fl W 10s.

Morant Cays Lighthouse is 32 miles (51 km) south east of Jamaica on the easternmost point of North-East Cay in the Morant Cays. The Morant Cays are administratively part of St Thomas, Jamaica.

The light lists describe it as a framework tower, so the present tower might not be the original lighthouse.

It is maintained by the Port Authority of Jamaica, an agency of the Ministry of Transport and Works.

== See also ==
- List of lighthouses in Jamaica.
