= Lover's Leap Lighthouse =

- Location: Lover's Leap; St Elizabeth; Jamaica
- Coordinates: 17.869232°N 77.660466°W

Tower
- Construction: metal tower
- Height: 100 feet (30 m)
- Shape: cylindrical tower with lantern and octagonal gallery
- Markings: tower painted with red and white horizontal bands, white lantern, red gallery
- Heritage: national monument

Light
- First lit: unknown
- Focal height: 530 metres (1,740 ft))
- Range: 40 nmi (74 km; 46 mi)
- Characteristic: Fl W 10s.

Built by the Engineering Department of the Port Authority of Jamaica, Lover's Leap Lighthouse is Jamaica's most recent. It is a 100 feet (30 m) tall cylindrical steel(?) tower with lantern and octagonal gallery. It is powered by three different power sources: a generator, electricity and a set of batteries.

It is the highest lighthouse in the Western Hemisphere being located at the top of a spectacular vertical cliff; the surrounding area has been developed as a tourist attraction, with a restaurant and observation deck near the lighthouse.

It is maintained by the Port Authority of Jamaica, an agency of the Ministry of Transport and Works, and is on the list of designated National Heritage Sites in Jamaica.

== See also ==
List of lighthouses in Jamaica
