= Rio Minho =

River in Jamaica

Coordinates: 17.967°N 77.267°W

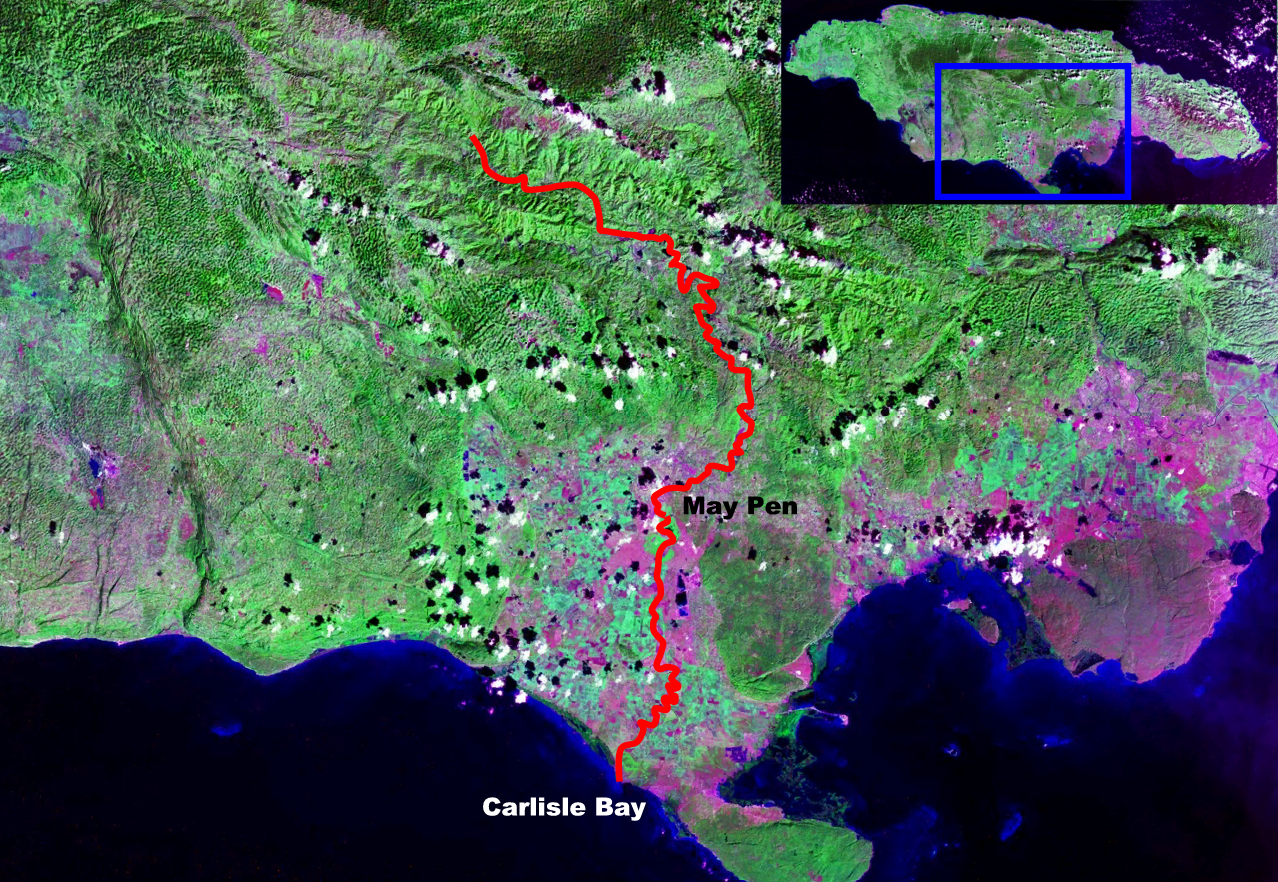

Location
- Country: Jamaica
- Parish: Clarendon

Physical characteristics
- Source
  - location: Mocho Mountains which are in the Western and North Western part of Clarendon
  - elevation: approx., 706 meters (2,300 ft.)
- Mouth
  - location: Portland Point in Clarendon
  - elevation: 3 m. (9 ft)
- Length: 92.8 km (57.7 mi)
- Basin size: 1,700 km^{2} (660 sq mi)
- Discharge
  - average: 150 cm^{3} per sec. (5,300 cu ft^{3})

The Rio Minho is the longest river in Jamaica at 92.8 kilometres (57.7 mi). It rises close to the island's geographic centre, flows generally south-southwest and reaches the Caribbean Sea at Carlisle Bay in the central south coast, to the west of the island's southernmost point, Portland Point.

The town of May Pen, Clarendon lies on the banks of the river.

== IUGS geological heritage site ==
In respect of it being the 'most diverse and thickest limestone succession with abundant rudist bivalves within the Caribbean faunal province', the International Union of Geological Sciences (IUGS) included the 'Late Cretaceous rudist bivalves of the Caribbean Province' around the Rio Minho in its assemblage of 100 'geological heritage sites' around the world in a listing published in October 2022. The organisation defines an IUGS Geological Heritage Site as 'a key place with geological elements and/or processes of international scientific relevance, used as a reference, and/or with a substantial contribution to the development of geological sciences through history.'
