= Rose Hall Lighthouse =

- Location: Rose Hall, St James; Jamaica
- Coordinates: 18.523592°N 77.813188°W

Tower
- Construction: steel skeletal tower
- Height: 27 metres (89 ft)
- Shape: square tower with gallery and light
- Markings: white tower
- Operator: Hilton Rose Hall Resort

Light
- Focal height: 32 metres (105 ft)
- Characteristic: Fl (5) W 30s.

Rose Hall Lighthouse is a lighthouse on the northernmost tip of Jamaica.

It is maintained by the Port Authority of Jamaica, an agency of the Ministry of Transport and Works.

== See also ==
List of lighthouses in Jamaica
