= Negril Lighthouse =

Lighthouse in Jamaica

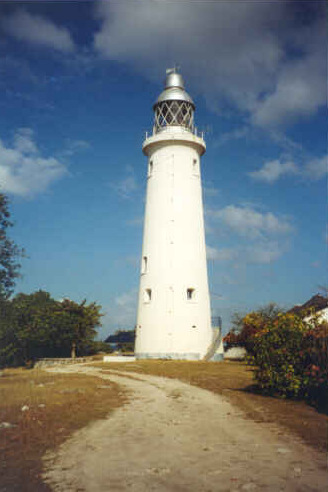
- Location: Negril Point; Westmoreland; Jamaica
- Coordinates: 18.2484318°N 78.3605111°W

Tower
- Constructed: 1894
- Foundation: a 14 feet (4.3 m) deep tank of water for balance and security during earthquakes
- Construction: reinforced concrete tower
- Automated: yes
- Height: 27 metres (89 ft)
- Shape: tapered cylindrical tower with balcony and lantern
- Markings: white tower and lantern
- Power source: solar power
- Heritage: national monument

Light
- Focal height: 31 metres (102 ft)
- Range: 15 nmi (28 km; 17 mi)
- Characteristic: One flash every 2 s, alternating red and white

Negril Lighthouse was built in 1894 1.5 miles (2.4 km) south south east of the westernmost tip of the island of Jamaica by the French company Barber & Bernard. It is one of the earliest concrete lighthouses.

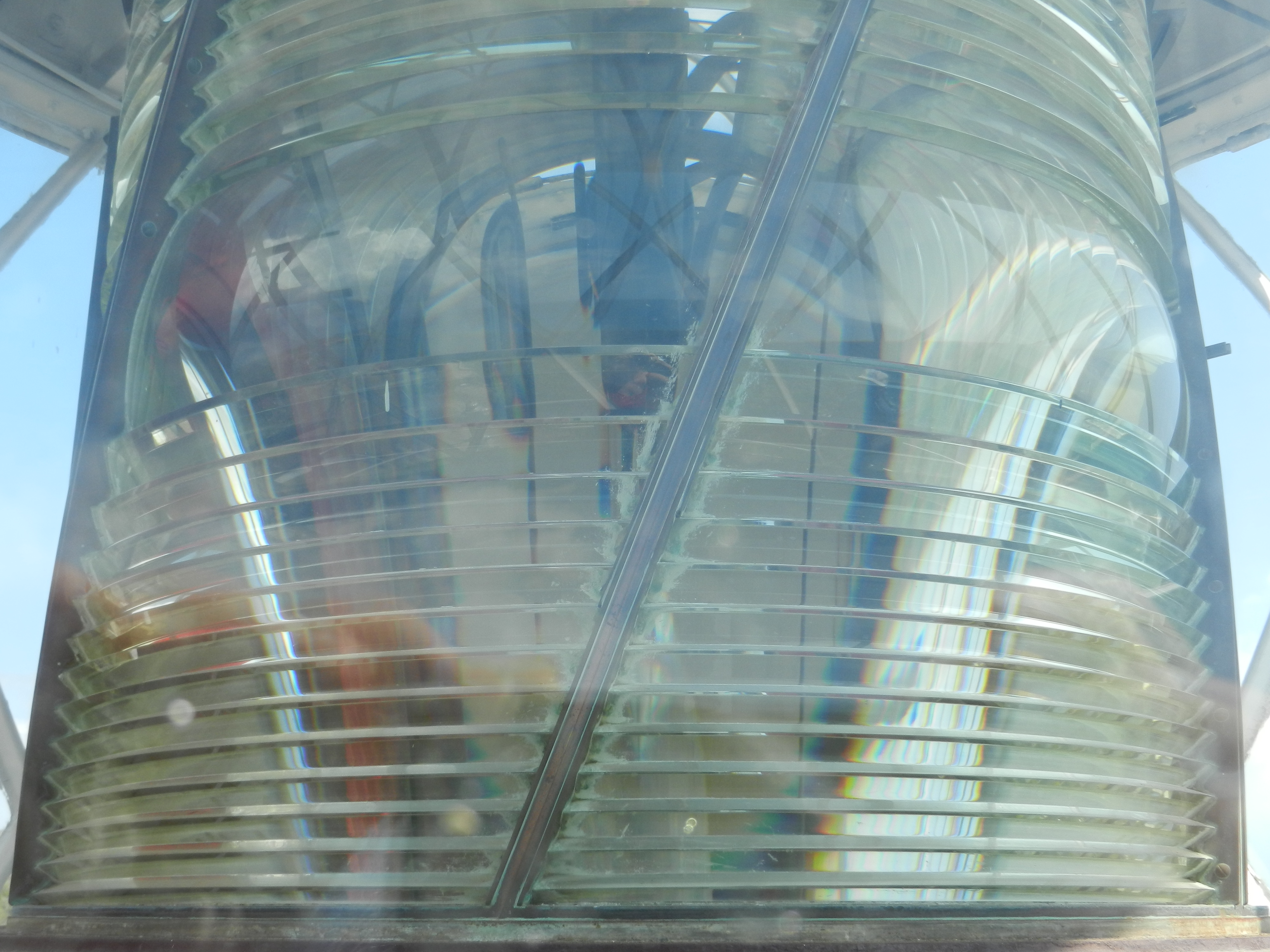
Fresnel lens in operation at Negril Point

Its foundation is a tank 14 feet (4.3 m) deep, which is kept filled with water to keep the 20-metre (66 ft) (27 metres (89 ft) according to Rowlett) reinforced concrete tower balanced and secured in the event of an earthquake. The tower is topped with a lantern and gallery.

An automatic white light 30 m (100 feet) above sea level flashes every two seconds. The light was operated by gas initially, switching to acetylene in 1956 and solar energy in 1985.

Several adjacent one-story frame keeper's houses are staffed.

The site is a well-known attraction of the Negril area.

It is maintained by the Port Authority of Jamaica, an agency of the Ministry of Transport and Works.

== See also ==
- List of lighthouses in Jamaica
