= Plumb Point Lighthouse =

Lighthouse in Jamaica

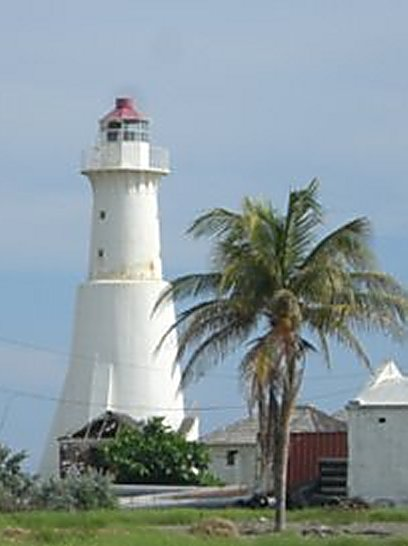
- Plumb Point Lighthouse from the NE.
- Location: Great Plumb Point; Palisadoes Peninsula; St Andrew; Jamaica
- Coordinates: 17.9286656°N 76.778217°W

Tower
- Constructed: 1853
- Foundation: concrete
- Construction: lower half stone and upper half cast iron
- Height: 21 metres (69 ft)
- Shape: two stage tapered cylindrical tower with balcony and lantern
- Markings: white tower, red lantern roof

Light
- Focal height: 21 metres (69 ft)
- Range: 25 miles (40 km)
- Characteristic: Fl WR 9s.

Plumb Point Lighthouse is an active 19th century heritage lighthouse, located on the Palisadoes a narrow peninsular that connects Port Royal to the mainland. The light helps guide shipping into Kingston Harbour.

Built in 1853 it is claimed that the light at the lighthouse has gone out only once since then, during the 1907 earthquake. The 70 feet (21 m) stone and cast iron tower with lantern and gallery shows a white light visible for about 40 km (25 mi) over the entrance of the eastern navigable channel and a red light over the south channel which is visible for 20 km (12 mi).

The entire lighthouse is painted white and is in the historic Port Royal Protected Area, which the government hopes to develop as a tourist attraction. It is positioned about 8 km (5.0 mi) east of Port Royal and the entrance to Kingston Harbour near Norman Manley International Airport.

It is maintained by the Port Authority of Jamaica, an agency of the Ministry of Transport and Works.

== See also ==
- List of lighthouses in Jamaica
