= Galina Lighthouse =

Lighthouse in Jamaica

- Location: St Mary, Jamaica
- Coordinates: 18.410037°N 76.892589°W

Tower
- Constructed: 1912
- Construction: concrete tower
- Height: 13 feet (4.0 m)
- Shape: strongly tapered tower with balcony and no lantern
- Markings: white tower
- Power source: solar power
- Heritage: national monument

Light
- First lit: 1912 (first)
- Focal height: 19 metres (62 ft))
- Range: 19 kilometres (12 mi)
- Characteristic: Fl W 12s.

Galina Lighthouse is a strongly tapered white concrete tower 13 metres (43 ft) high with no lantern. A solar-powered lens is mounted on a small platform at the top. It shows a white light flashing once every twelve seconds for a duration of 1.2 seconds followed by 10.8 seconds of darkness. The light is visible for 19 kilometres (12 mi). The lighthouse is solar powered.

The station was established in 1912 but the tower's date of construction is unknown.

It is maintained by the Port Authority of Jamaica, an agency of the Ministry of Transport and Works.

== See also ==
- List of lighthouses in Jamaica
