= South Negril Point =

- Headland
- Location within Jamaica
- Coordinates: 18.2686155°N 78.368724°W
- Country: Jamaica
- Parish: Westmoreland
- Time zone: UTC-5 (EST)

South Negril Point is the westernmost point of mainland Jamaica. It is located a little south of the resort town of Negril and a little north of Negril Lighthouse.
