= Half Moon Point =

- Headland
- Location within Jamaica
- Coordinates: 18.5254187°N 77.8365737°W
- Country: Jamaica
- Parish: St James
- Time zone: UTC-5 (EST)

Half Moon Point is the northernmost point of mainland Jamaica. It is named for the resort on whose property it sits. Immediately to its west is Half Moon Bay, and a little to its east is Rose Hall.

== See also ==
- List of countries by northernmost point
