= Folly Lighthouse =

Lighthouse in Jamaica

Folly Lighthouse Port Antonio
- Location: Folly Peninsula; Port Antonio; Jamaica
- Coordinates: 18.188862°N 76.443104°W

Tower
- Constructed: 1888
- Construction: brick tower
- Height: 49 feet (15 m)
- Shape: tapered cylindrical tower
- Markings: tower painted with orange-red and white bands
- Power source: solar power
- Operator: Port Authority of Jamaica
- Heritage: national monument

Light
- First lit: 1888
- Focal height: 53 feet (16 m)
- Range: 13 miles (21 km)
- Characteristic: Fl W 10s.

Built in 1888, Folly Lighthouse is a brick tower with lantern and gallery. It flashes a white light every 10 seconds that is visible for 13 miles (21 km). The light is solar powered. A garden surrounds the lighthouse.

It is maintained by the Port Authority of Jamaica, an agency of the Ministry of Transport and Works.

== See also ==
List of lighthouses in Jamaica
