= Morant Cays =

Jamaican island group in the northern Caribbean Sea

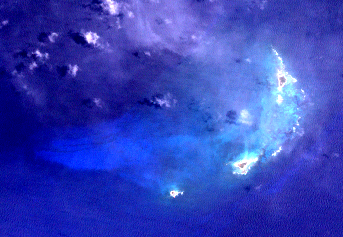
- NASA Landsat image of the Morant Cays and Bank, visible color -33 percent brightness and +66 percent contrast enhanced

- Location within the Caribbean

Geography
- Location: Caribbean
- Coordinates: 17°24′N 75°59′W

Administration
- Jamaica

The Morant Cays is an offshore island group 51 km SSE off Morant Point, Jamaica. It is one of two offshore island groups belonging to Jamaica, the other one is the Pedro Cays.

== History ==
In 1780, HMS Pelican, under the command of Cuthbert Collingwood was navigating off Morant Cays when a hurricane descended around the area and the ship was destroyed on the Cays. The crew were shipwrecked but managed to get ashore in rafts where they remained for ten days until rescued. The island group has been the site of many other shipwrecks.

The cays were annexed in 1862 by the United Kingdom and added to Jamaica in 1882.

Morant Cays Lighthouse was built on the island to warn shipping of the presence of the islands.

== Geography ==
The cays are located at 17°24′N 75°59′W and consist of four small islets grouped closely together along the south-eastern rim of Morant Bank, an extensive crescent-shaped bank of coral, over 7 km long, rising from a depth of 1,000 m. The area of Morant Bank is about 100 km^{2}. The aggregate land area of the four cays is only 16 hectares (40 acres). The Morant Cays are low-lying, mostly uninhabited, seasonally visited by fishermen, and fronted by highly exposed reefs over which the sea constantly breaks.

=== Flora and fauna ===
The islands have sparse vegetation and are a seabird rookery and turtle nesting area. Seabird eggs and guano are collected periodically. A 15,000 ha site, comprising the cays and surrounding waters, has been designated an Important Bird Area (IBA) by BirdLife International because it supports significant breeding populations of seabirds, including brown noddies as well as sooty, bridled and royal terns.

=== Islets ===
- North-East Cay , at 17°25′N 75°59′W, is sometimes divided into three parts, the sea washing over the connecting sand spits. There is a fishermen's camp, established by the Jamaican Ministry of Agriculture, with several huts and a water tank on the south side of the cay. There is a lighthouse at Breezy Point, the easternmost point of the cay and of Jamaica.
- North-West Cay
- South-East Cay, at 17°23′N 76°00′W, lies 1.9 km SSW of North-East Cay. Sand spits, which extend from its ends, alter in shape with the seasons of the year; in summer the south-western spit is washed away and deposited on the western side of the cay.
- South-West Cay (South Cay), at 17°23′N 76°01′W, lies 1.6 km south-west of South-East Cay. A rocky ledge extending from the cay is used as a pier.
