= Pedro Bank =

Jamaican submerged bank in the western Caribbean

Pedro Bank Placer de la Víbora
- Submerged bank Pedro Bank (the Caribbean)
- Interactive map of Pedro Bank; Placer de la Víbora
- Sea: Caribbean
- Area: Nicaragua Rise
- Country: Jamaica
- Minimum depth: 20 m

Pedro Bank is a large bank of sand and coral, partially covered with seagrass, about 80 km south and south-west of Jamaica, rising steeply from a seabed of 800 m depth.

== History ==
Pedro Bank was originally named 'Viper Bank', Spanish: Placer de la Víbora, by Spanish mariners because its shallow reefs, rocks and shoals are laid out in the shape of a gigantic serpent. It was once a busy and treacherous shipping passage used by seafaring Europeans in the 16th and 17th centuries; archaeologists estimate there are over 300 shipwrecks on the bank.

Pedro Bank was annexed by the United Kingdom in 1863 and added to Jamaica in 1882. Today it is known for its economic and cultural importance; it is the main harvesting ground for Queen Conch in the Caribbean and is highly valued by Jamaica's fishing community who have been operating on the bank and using its small cays as a base since the 1920s.

== Geography ==
Pedro Bank is a part of submarine Nicaragua Rise, which stretches from Cabo Gracias a Dios through Rosalind Bank to Jamaica. It slopes gently from the Pedro Cays to the west and north with depths from 13 to 30 metres (43–98 feet). The total area of the bank within the 100-metre (328-foot) isobath measures 8,040 square kilometres (3,104 square miles). The area of a depth to 40 metres (130 feet) is triangular, 70 kilometres (43 miles) long east-west, and 43 kilometres (27 miles) wide. 2,400 square kilometres (927 square miles) are less than 20 metres (66 feet) deep. With its islets, cays and rocks, a total land area of 270,000 m^{2} (2,906,256 sq ft), it is the location of one of the two offshore island groups of Jamaica, the other one being the Morant Cays (Jamaica also has nearshore islands like the Port Royal Cays). The bank is centered at 17°06′N 78°20′W.

=== Important Bird Area ===
The area, including the surrounding waters, has been designated an Important Bird Area (IBA) by BirdLife International because it supports significant resident and breeding populations of seabirds, including magnificent frigatebirds, brown and masked boobies, laughing gulls, brown noddies, sooty, bridled and royal terns.

=== Cays, rocks and reefs ===
The Pedro Cays, at 17°00′N 77°50′W, four small, flat (2 to 5 metres high), low-lying and mostly uninhabited cays, lie about midway along the southern edge of the eastern half of Pedro Bank. The sparse land vegetation consists of six species of plants, none of which are endemic. The cays are regionally important seabird nesting and roosting areas (masked boobies, roseate terns and others) and also provide several endangered turtle species such as hawksbills and loggerheads with nesting grounds. The islets yield some guano and coconuts. More importantly, they represent the primary harvesting area for the largest export of Queen Conch from the Caribbean region. They were occupied by the British in 1863 and made part of Jamaica in 1882. They are considered part of the parish of Kingston, for all purposes except taxes.

- Northeast Cay (also called Top Cay), 75,000 square metres (807,293 square feet), at 17°03′N 77°46′W, is covered with brush and has a group of palm trees growing on its northwest side. There is a lighted beacon in the north.
- Middle Cay, 40,000 m^{2} (430,556 sq ft), at 17°01′N 77°47′W is covered with low grass and bushes. A Jamaican Coast Guard station and a fishermen's camp with number of huts and a large shed are in the southeast.
- Southwest Cay (also called Bird Cay), 152,000 square metres (1,636,114 square feet), at 16°59′N 77°49′W, the largest of the Pedro Cays, is a protected bird sanctuary, with a large tree.
- South Cay (also called Sandy Cay), 2,000 square metres (21,528 square feet), at 16°57′N 77°50′W, consists of coral and shells. This is the southernmost point of land of Jamaica.

In a wider sense, some over-water rocks, small outcrops of oolitic limestone over which water breaks, are considered part of the Pedro Cays:

- Portland Rock (also called Eastern Pedro Cay), at 17°06′N 77°27′W, lies about 63 km SSW of Portland Point, the southern extremity of Jamaica. The rock consists of two summits that lie in an east-west direction.
- Blower Rock, at 17°03′N 77°31′W, lies 8 km southwest of Portland Rock, and is 0.6 m high.
- Shannon Rock, at 17°02′N 77°40′W, lies about 15 km WSW of Blower Rock. It is 0.5 m high.

There are several submarine features on Pedro Bank, such as:

- Doyle Shoal, at 17°09′N 77°33′W, with a depth of 14 m, lies 13 km NNW of Blower Rock.
- Willsteed Rock, at 17°08′N 77°37′W, with a depth of 12, lies 13 km northwest of Blower Rock.
- Banner Reef, at 16°52′N 78°06′W, awash and 2.4 km long, lies 26 km WSW of South Cay.
- Southwest Rock, at 16°48′N 78°11′W, lies about 9 km southwest of Banner Reef.
- Powell Knoll, at 16°47′N 77°43′W, lies 32 km southwest of Shannon Rock, with a lowest depth of 28.8 m. It is the southernmost feature of Jamaica, not counting Alice Shoal, which is claimed by Jamaica but considered a part of Colombia.
