= Morant Point =

- Easternmost extremity
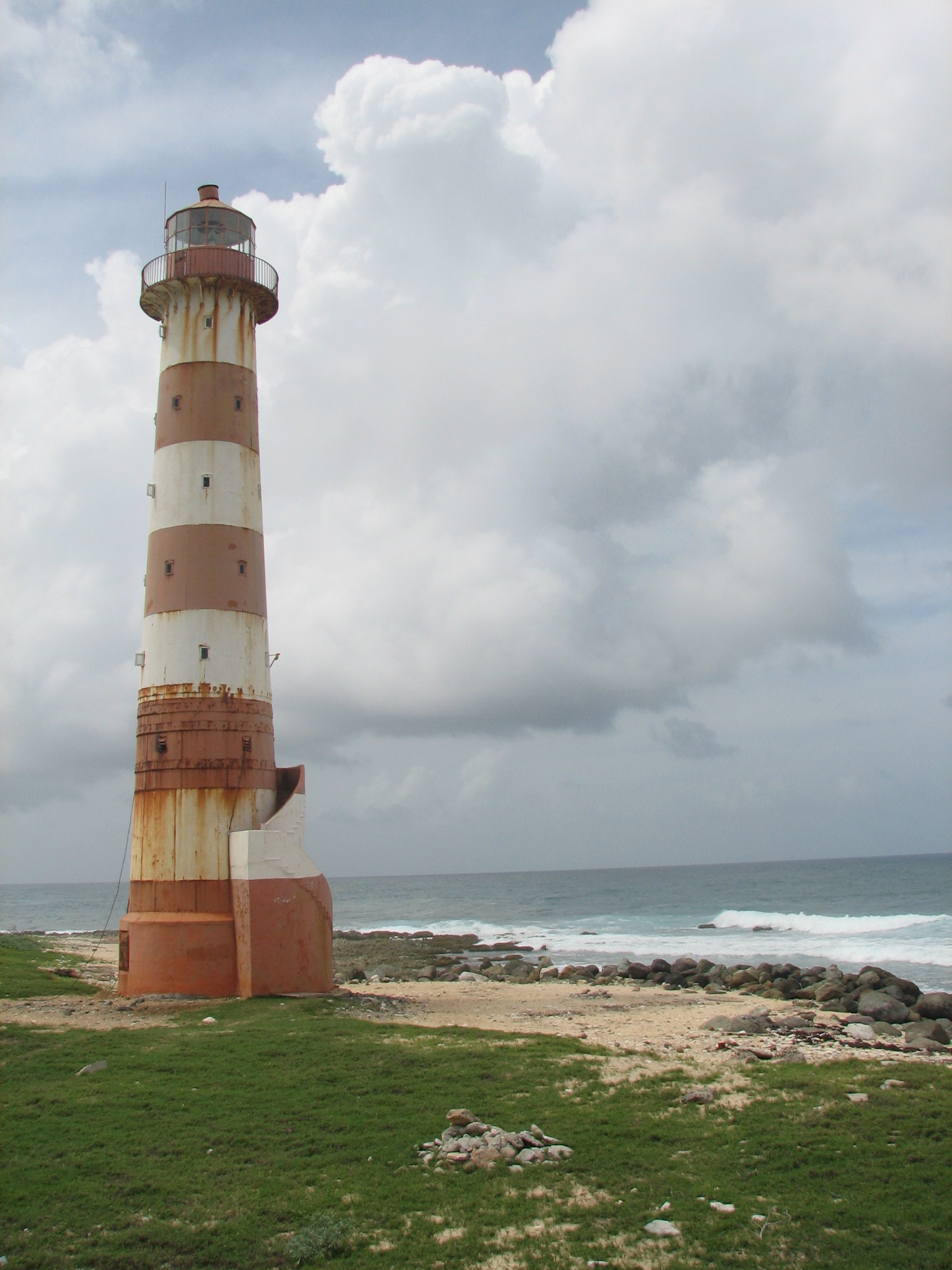
- Morant Point Lighthouse looking north north east.

- Location within Jamaica
- Coordinates: 17.9149202°N 76.1881685°W
- Country: Jamaica
- Parish: St Thomas
- Time zone: UTC-5 (EST)

Morant Point in Saint Thomas Parish is the easternmost point of mainland Jamaica and the site of Morant Point Lighthouse.

== History ==
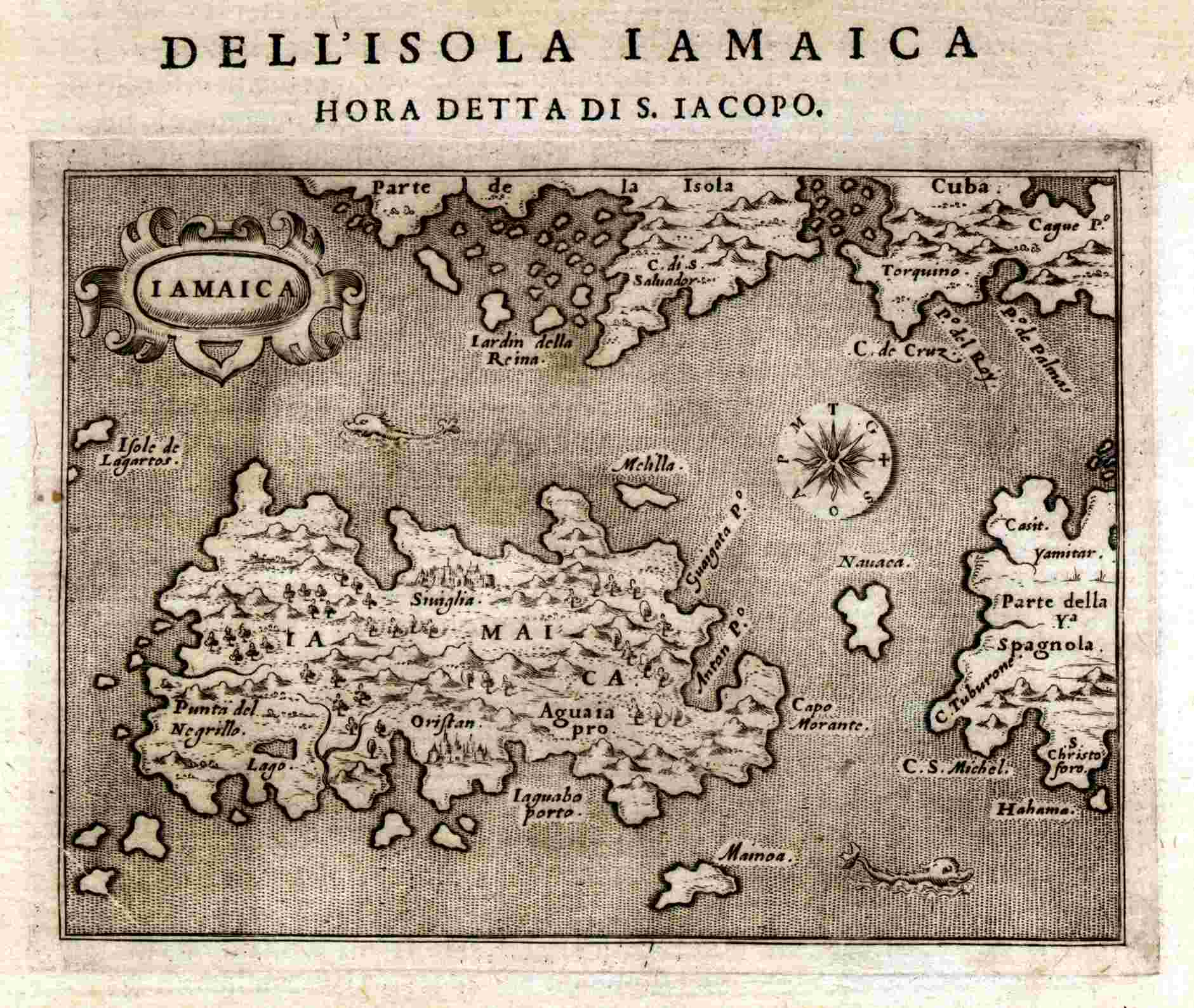
1572 map of Jamaica by Tomaso Porcacchi.

It is called Cape Morante on several early maps including one dated 1572. It has had the name Morant Point since at least 1671.

== Climate ==
Climate data for Morant Point Lighthouse
Month	Jan	Feb	Mar	Apr	May	Jun	Jul	Aug	Sep	Oct	Nov	Dec	Year
Mean daily maximum °C (°F)	27.6 (81.7)	27.9 (82.2)	28.8 (83.8)	29.3 (84.7)	29.9 (85.8)	30.2 (86.4)	30.6 (87.1)	30.9 (87.6)	30.6 (87.1)	30.3 (86.5)	29.2 (84.6)	28.2 (82.8)	29.5 (85.1)
Mean daily minimum °C (°F)	22.2 (72.0)	21.8 (71.2)	22.1 (71.8)	22.4 (72.3)	23.2 (73.8)	23.8 (74.8)	24.4 (75.9)	25.2 (77.4)	23.4 (74.1)	22.7 (72.9)	23.1 (73.6)	22.7 (72.9)	23.1 (73.6)
Average precipitation mm (inches)	89 (3.5)	81 (3.2)	55 (2.2)	74 (2.9)	178 (7.0)	151 (5.9)	86 (3.4)	125 (4.9)	188 (7.4)	266 (10.5)	205 (8.1)	136 (5.4)	1,634 (64.3)
Average relative humidity (%) (at 13:00)	79	77	76	75	79	80	83	80	79	75	81	78	79
Source: Meteorological Service (Jamaica)
