= Portland Point =

- Headland
- Location within Jamaica
- Coordinates: 17.7048658°N 77.1672821°W
- Country: Jamaica
- Parish: Clarendon
- Time zone: UTC-5 (EST)

Nautical chart of Portland Point to South Negril Point

Portland Point is the southernmost point in Jamaica. It is halfway along the island's south coast at the end of a hilly peninsula in Clarendon. A large bay, Portland Bight, lies to the east of it.

== See also ==
- List of countries by southernmost point
