= Brighton, Jamaica =

Settlement in Saint Elizabeth, Jamaica

Brighton Braitn
- Settlement
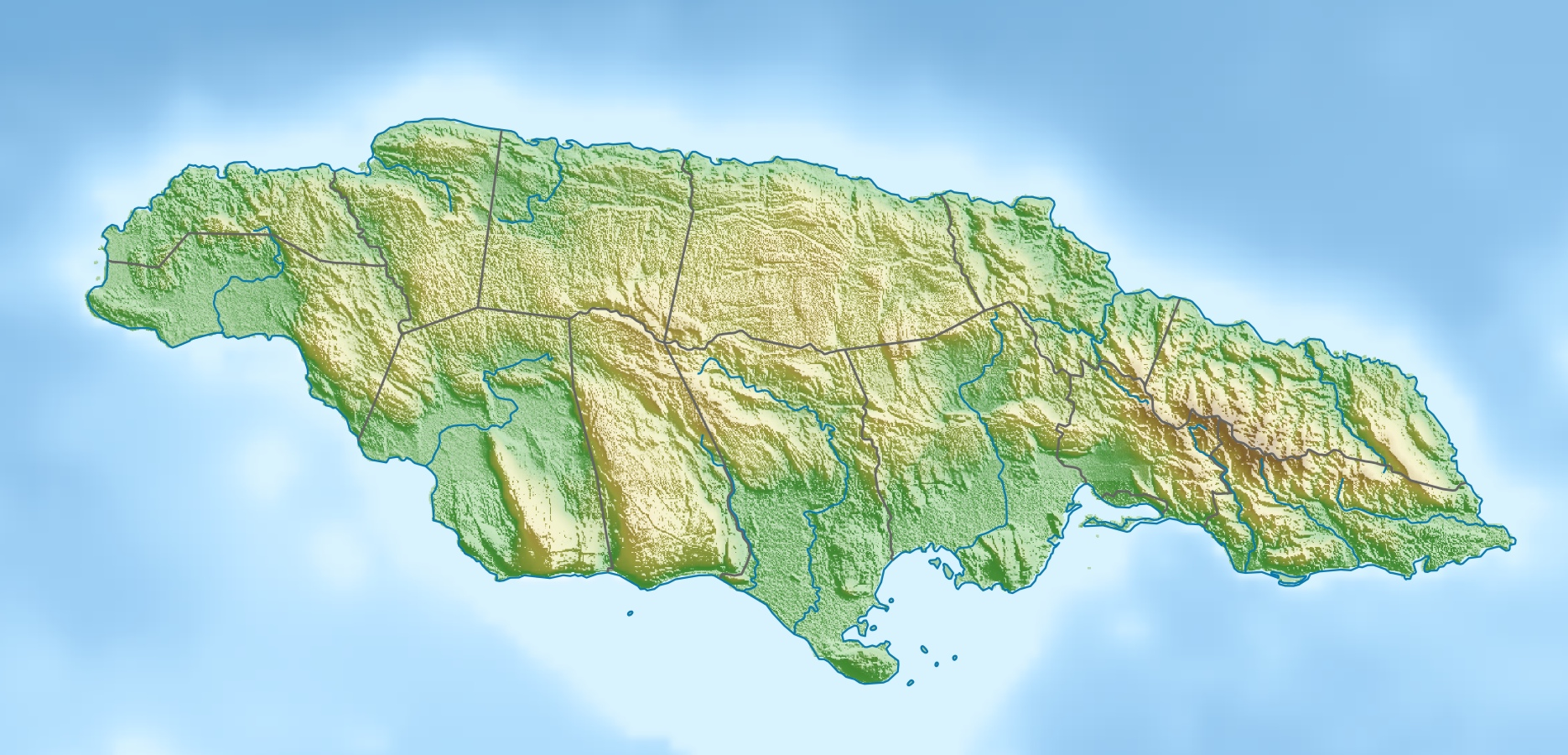
- Location of Brighton in Jamaica
- Coordinates: 18°09′00″N 77°52′23″W
- Country: Jamaica
- Parish: Saint Elizabeth
- County: Cornwall
- Constituency: Saint Elizabeth North Western
- Electoral Divison: New Market

Government
  - Body: Saint Elizabeth Municipal Corporation
  - Councilor: Richard Solomon (JLP)

Population (2022)
  - Total: 1,674

Brighton is a settlement located in the parish of Saint Elizabeth, Jamaica. It is situated in North-western Saint Elizabeth and is in the constituency of Saint Elizabeth North Western. Brighton is represented by MP Andrew Morris in the House of Representatives, and by Richard Solomon locally.

== Geography ==
Brighton is located in the Northwest of Saint Elizabeth, not far from the border with Westmoreland and Saint James. It is on rugged and hilly terrain that can reach around 1,600 feet high in some areas. Nearby rivers include the New River, Black River, Smith River, and Braes River.

== History ==
Brighton was heavily impacted by Hurricane Melissa in 2025 and suffered significant flooding. Due to the hurricane, multiple rivers broke their banks and flooded many parts of Brighton.

In 2024, Brighton got free Wi-Fi for the first time. It was implemented by the Universal Service Fund (USF) who attempted to provide Wi-Fi to many underserved communities across Jamaica.

== Neighbouring communities ==
The neighbouring communities of Brighton include New Market, Lacovia, Ipswich, Nightingale Grove, Happy Grove, Crawle, White Hill, Beersheba, Prospect, Springfield, Broad Leaf, Woodlands, Berkshirewood, Frazer, Ginger Hill, and Pisgah.

== Demographics ==
According to the Statistical Institute of Jamaica (STATIN), Brighton had a population of 1,674, and had 700 dwellings. These population figures reflect official administrative boundaries rather than the area as a whole. The neighbouring settlement of New Market had a population of 2,868 that same year.

== Governance and politics ==
Brighton is represented nationally and locally. It is locally represented under New Market, and nationally under Saint Elizabeth North Western.

In the 2025 Jamaican General Election, the Jamaica Labour Party (JLP) candidate, former Lacovia High School Principal Andrew Morris got 5,553 votes and secured the seat. In second place came the People's National Party (PNP) candidate Patricia Scarlett-Forrester, with 3,825 votes. In third place the Jamaica Progressive Party (JPP) candidate with 40 votes. Morris won roughly 58 percent of the vote, while Scarlett-Forrester won about 40 percent of the vote. The JPP failed to get 1 percent of the vote.

In the 2024 Jamaican Local Elections, the JLP candidate, Richard Solomon won the seat with 1,408 votes. The PNP candidate, Christopher Anthonio Russell won 739 votes. Solomon got roughly 65 percent of the vote while Russell won about 34 percent of the vote.

Voter turnout is poor in both Saint Elizabeth North Western and New Market, though, this is common across Jamaica. In the General Election, Saint Elizabeth North Western had a turnout of 41 percent. In the Local Election, New Market had a turnout of approximately 26 percent.
