= Malvern, Jamaica =

Village in St. Elizabeth Parish, Jamaica

Malvern
- Village
- Interactive map of Malvern
- Coordinates: 17°58′04″N 77°41′38″W
- Country: Jamaica
- County: Cornwall
- Parish: St. Elizabeth
- Constituency: Saint Elizabeth South Eastern
- Elevation: 700 m (2,300 ft)
- Time zone: UTC−5 (EST)

Malvern is a village in the Santa Cruz Mountains of St. Elizabeth Parish, Jamaica, about 2,300 feet (700 m) above sea level. Named after the spa town of Malvern in England, it was known in the 19th century as a health resort because of its cool climate. The Jamaica Information Service lists it among the main towns of the parish, together with Santa Cruz, Junction and Balaclava.

Malvern is an important centre of education. It is home to Bethlehem Moravian College (founded 1861) and Hampton School (founded 1858), while Munro College (founded 1856) stands in the nearby district of Potsdam.

== Geography ==
Malvern lies on the Santa Cruz Mountains, the range that runs north to south through St. Elizabeth, dividing the parish's plains and ending in a 1,600-foot (490 m) precipice at Lovers' Leap. The Moravian settlement of Bethlehem sits on hills just above the village. To the south, Munro College stands at the summit of the mountains, overlooking the Pedro Plains and the Caribbean Sea. The farming town of Southfield lies further south along the ridge, and Santa Cruz, the parish's main commercial centre, lies to the north.

The area has long been noted for its mild climate. Travel writers describe it as having one of the best climates in Jamaica, and in the 19th century it was called the "Switzerland of the Caribbean".

== History ==
=== Moravian mission ===
Moravian missionaries first landed at Black River in 1754, invited by the Foster and Barham plantation families, and worked among enslaved people in the St. Elizabeth lowlands. Many missionaries died of disease in the swampy lowlands, and the church later moved its work into the healthier hills. The mission station of New Bethlehem was established in 1834. The nearby Lititz Moravian Church was established in 1838 and restored in 2007.

=== Health resort ===
In the 19th century, wealthy Britons travelled to the Santa Cruz ridge to recover from illness, and some built large stone villas along it. Malvern served as a resort for Europeans seeking relief from the hotter lowlands.

=== Munro and Dickenson Trust ===
Planter Robert Hugh Munro's will, dated 21 January 1797, left part of his estate to his nephew Caleb Dickenson and the churchwardens of St. Elizabeth to establish a school for poor children. Dickenson died in 1821, also directing that his uncle's wishes be carried out. In 1855 part of the bequest was recovered and an Act of the Jamaican legislature created the Governors and Trustees of the Munro and Dickenson Free School and Charity. The trust founded the boys' school that became Munro College in 1856 and the girls' school that became Hampton School in 1858.

=== Recent history ===
Hurricane Dean in 2007 destroyed Malvern's historic building housing the police station and courthouse. A new police station opened in 2012.

Hurricane Beryl in July 2024 damaged 31 of the 35 buildings at Munro College, with early repair costs estimated at US$2 million (J$310 million). Munro College and Hampton School were among eight St. Elizabeth schools listed by the Ministry of Education as severely damaged. In October 2025, Hurricane Melissa made landfall in St. Elizabeth, causing widespread damage across the parish.

== Communities ==
Malvern serves as the postal and commercial centre for several surrounding hillside districts. These include:

- Malvern – the village centre, with the police station, post office, branch library, shops and service businesses.
- Bethlehem – the Moravian settlement above the village, home of the Bethlehem Moravian Church, Bethlehem Moravian College and Bethlehem All Age and Infant School.
- Hampton – formerly the Fort Rose property, purchased by the Munro and Dickenson Trust in 1896 as the site of Hampton School.
- Potsdam – the district surrounding Munro College, served with Epping Forest and Corby by Epping Forest All Age School. The district kept its German name even after the school itself was renamed during the First World War.
- Stanmore – northwest of Malvern, home of St. Alban's All Age School, which also serves Ginger Ground, Retrieve and Joyland.
- Schoolfield – a district in north-east St. Elizabeth on the Santa Cruz Mountains, with Schoolfield Primary and Infant School.
- Mullings – served along with Bethlehem and Munro College by the Bethlehem school shelter.
- Malvern Well and Hounslow – districts southwest of the village along Malvern Well Road.
- Torrington – briefly a site of the girls' school before it moved to Malvern.

== Education ==
=== Bethlehem Moravian College ===
Bethlehem Moravian College was established in June 1861 by the Moravian Church in Jamaica at Bethabara in Newport, Manchester, to train female teachers. It opened with three students. The college closed at Bethabara in 1887 before moving to Bethlehem, Malvern, where a Moravian congregation already existed.

It remained a women's college until 1980, when men were first admitted. It later became a multidisciplinary institution and was renamed from Bethlehem Teachers' College to Bethlehem Moravian College. In 2003 it was one of two colleges chosen to offer the Primary Diploma in Literacy Studies. It introduced bachelor's degrees in primary and secondary education in 2007, in collaboration with the Consortium of Institutions for Teacher Education, and in literacy studies in 2009 with the University of the West Indies. Under a 2014 agreement between the Teachers' Colleges of Jamaica and the UWI, the college began awarding Bachelor of Education degrees, and its first cohort graduated in November 2015.

The college also offers business studies and hospitality and tourism management, as well as short courses open to the wider Malvern community. In December 2021, a J$40.3 million early childhood training centre built by the CHASE Fund was opened on the campus. The college's motto is Mihi Cura Futuri ("My Care is for the Future"). Its principal is Albert Corcho. Lowel Morgan chairs its board of management.

=== Hampton School ===
Hampton School is an all-girls boarding school founded in 1858 by the Munro and Dickenson Trust and is one of the oldest girls' boarding schools in Jamaica. The girls' school first opened at Potsdam on the same property as the boys' school, then moved briefly to Torrington and to Mount Zion (now Stirling). In 1885 it reopened at Malvern House under Miss McCutcheon, and by 1891 it had moved to the Hampton property (formerly Fort Rose), rented from Mrs. Boxer. The trustees purchased the property for £800 in 1896. Its first headmistress was Miss Elizabeth Ramson (1858–1884). By 1904 the school had more than 60 students, and it now enrols about 950 girls, roughly one-third of them boarders. Its motto is Summa virtute et humanitate ("With the utmost courage and courtesy").

=== Munro College ===
Munro College opened in 1856 as the Munro and Dickenson Free School for boys near Black River, with seven or eight pupils under its first headmaster, Charles Plummer. It was later moved to Potsdam in the Santa Cruz Mountains and known as Potsdam School, and it was renamed Munro College during the First World War. The school sits on about 150 acres at the summit of the ridge. Its motto is In Arce Sitam Quis Occultabit ("A city set upon a hill cannot be hid"). Its alumni include former Prime Minister Donald Sangster and several government ministers.

=== Primary schools ===
Primary-level schools in and around Malvern include Bethlehem All Age and Infant School, St. Alban's All Age School in Stanmore, Schoolfield Primary and Infant School, Epping Forest All Age School in Potsdam and St. Mary's Primary and Infant School.

== Religion ==
The Bethlehem Moravian Church, whose churchyard contains stone grave slabs about 200 years old, is the area's oldest congregation. Other places of worship include St. Alban's Anglican Church and the Malvern Seventh-day Adventist Church, as well as the chapels of Munro College and Hampton School.

== Economy ==
Education is the main source of employment in Malvern. A 1998 report described the Moravian mission and its teachers' college as the village's main source of regular jobs. Farming is also important: hill farmers grow crops such as yam, pumpkin and hot pepper, and have sold surplus produce to the college.

Local businesses include guest houses and villas such as AllenView and Sanative Villa, restaurants and bars such as the Hampton Bar and Grill and Sports and Entertainment Complex and the Vault Restaurant and Bar, a gas station, computer repair and design services, and an agro-processing plant operated by Grace Agro Processors at Hounslow on Malvern Well Road.

== Government and services ==
Malvern is in the Saint Elizabeth South Eastern constituency, represented in the House of Representatives by Franklyn Witter of the Jamaica Labour Party. Public facilities in the village include the Malvern Police Station, the Malvern Post Office and the Malvern Branch Library.

== Notable people ==
- Barbara Gloudon (1935–2022), journalist, broadcaster and playwright, was born in Malvern.

== See also ==
- Bethlehem Moravian College
- Hampton School (Jamaica)
- Munro College
- Saint Elizabeth Parish
- Jamaica Province of the Moravian Church
