= Gut River =

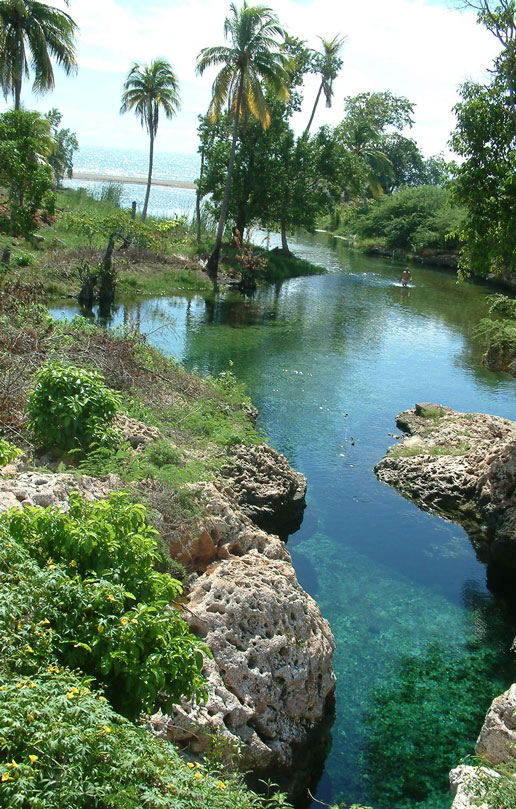
- Gut River and Jamaica's south coast.

Location
- Country: Jamaica

Physical characteristics
- Source
  - coordinates: 17.860796°N 77.466247°W
- Mouth
  - coordinates: 17.858034°N 77.469181°W
  - elevation: 0 m (0 ft)
- Length: 0.5 km (0.31 mi)

Gut River is the name of a river, beach and small hamlet on an isolated stretch of south-facing coastline in Manchester, Jamaica. The name is said by the locals to derive from the German word for good.

== River ==
This is a mostly underground river, which springs forth in a deep, clear pool.

== Beach ==
There is wading access along the river to the beach which is in the middle of Long Bay, Manchester, a mostly deserted 20-mile strip of black sand.

== Hamlet ==
On the east bank of the river there is a commercial beach property (access 100J$ in 2006) with bar facilities, which can be busy at holidays, but is usually very quiet and provides access to both the beach and the mouth of the river without wading. On the west bank is a private property. There appear to be no more than ten properties in the hamlet.

== Access ==
Gut River lies about 5 miles (8.0 km) east of Alligator Pond and 10 miles (16 km) west of Alligator Hole River which is near Milk River Bath. A very quiet coastal road joins these three rather isolated spots. Many years ago the road used only to be passable with 4WD vehicles but in 2006 the surface was in good order for ordinary cars.

== See also ==
- List of beaches in Jamaica
