= Black River High School (Black River, Jamaica) =

Location
- 80 High Street; Saint Elizabeth Parish; Black River; Jamaica
- Coordinates: 18.031954°N 77.859986°W

Information
- Motto: 'We Create Our Own Destiny'
- Founded: 1970
- School district: Ministry of Education Region V
- Principal: Christopher Romans
- Grades: 7 - 13
- Gender: Co-educational
- Age: 10 to 19
- Campus size: 16 acres (6.5 ha)
- Website: https://www.facebook.com/TheOfficialBlackRiverHighAlumni

Black River High School is a high school located in Black River, the parish capital of St Elizabeth, Jamaica.

== History ==
A privately operated high school was first established in Black River in September 1941. It was advertised as having preparatory, secondary, and commercial departments, boarding facilities, and its own swimming pool. The school was based at Waterloo House in Black River, a former hotel, and was led by Lynette Stewart, the wife of Waterloo's owner, Ferdinand Stewart. The school operated until the early 1960s. After the school closed, Waterloo became a guest house again. Joyce Robinson, who later in her career became a noted librarian, taught at the school from 1944 to 1949.

Black River Junior Secondary School was opened in September 1970 as a result of a World Bank-funded education project and was built on lands belonging to the Church of England. $86,393 Jamaican dollars were originally allotted for its development. The school was officially opened on 12 May 1971 by Edwin Allen, the Minister of Education, who declared that "bright children must be taught by bright teachers" and advocated for the development of teacher education in Jamaica.

In 1974, a number of changes were brought in. Grades 10 and 11 were added to the school roster, and "Junior" was removed from the school's name. A two-shift system was also introduced. In 1988, it was made a high school.

== Principals ==
1. Edgeton Harris (1970–1974)
2. Jonathan Scott (1974–1992)
3. Ricardo Gayle (1992–1994)
4. Barrington Buchanan (1994–2013)
5. Roderick Harley (2013–2015)
6. Valencia Honeyghan (2015–2016)
7. Theobold Fearon (2016–2017)
8. Christopher Romans (2017–present)

== Notable alumni ==
- Keith Gardner, athlete
- George-Levi Gayle, professor of economics at Washington University in St. Louis
