= Bredda Hype =

Bredda Hype is one of Jamaica's awarded top sound system from Saint Elizabeth Parish.

== Selectors ==
- Rohan Cowan (2014)
- Hamma
- Apache
- Twenty Six
- Collie Weed
- Soldgie
- Turbo
- prentice
- somm
- Dj Cena
