= Hampton School (Jamaica) =

All-girls boarding school

Location
- Malvern, St. Elizabeth, Jamaica; 17.96136°N 77.69207°W

Information
- Motto: Summa virtute et humanitate (With the utmost courage and courtesy)
- Founded: 1858
- Status: Open
- Head of school: Dr. Mahvell Charlton-Brown
- Gender: Female
- Language: English, Jamaican English
- Colours: Blue, White

Hampton School is an all-girls boarding school located in Malvern, Jamaica. It is one of the oldest boarding schools in Jamaica, and was founded in 1858, two years after its all boys counterpart Munro College. The school was originally named Fort-Rose, and was constructed from funds received from the Munro and Dickenson Trust. The school's motto is in Latin, "Summa Virtute Et Humanitate", which means: "With Utmost Courage and Courtesy".

== History ==
On 21 January 1797 Robert Munro left a residuary request in his will, addressed to his nephew Caleb Dickenson and the Churchwardens of St Elizabeth. Included were instructions to establish a school for the marginalized children in St. Elizabeth. In his lifetime, Dickenson would augment his uncle's estate, increasing its value. Upon his death in 1821, Dickenson left instructions in his will for the trustees of his wealth to perform his uncle's wishes.

This request would go unaddressed until 1855, when a new Trustee Board was established, known as "The Governors and Trustees of Munro and Dickenson Free School and Charity". In 1856 an all-boys school named Potsdam College was erected in Black River; later removed to Potsdam in 1857 and renamed to Munro College during World War I. In 1858, a year later, an all-girls school was erected on the same campus. This all-girls school was known as Fort-Rose.

The location of the all-girls school was moved several times, first to Torrington, then to Mt-Zion. The institution saw a change in 1885, moving to Malvern House. It would not reach its final and current location, Hampton, property of the Boxer family, until 1891. The year 1891 holds further significance in being the date of the renaming of the school to Hampton School for Girls. In 1896, on the decease of Mr. Boxer, the Hampton property was purchased by the Munroe and Dickenson Trust for £800.

== Historic Buildings ==
Chapel

The Hampton School Chapel was built over a 10-year timespan (1922 to 1932). The chapel hosts a stained-glass window designed by James Ballantine of Edinburgh. A piece of granite left over from the construction of Usher Hall in Edinburgh was donated by the builder of the Scottish War Memorial, Neil McLeod.

Calder Hall

Calder Hall was officially opened on 8 October 1913, after three and a half years of construction. Its erection was supervised by Henry Maxwell, one of the then trustees of the school. Calder Hall was named after John Vassal Calder, who served as Chairman of the Trust for more than 30 years.

== Notable Hamptonians ==
- Gloria Wesley-Gammon, educator and long-serving Headmistress of Hampton School
- Una Marson, feminist, activist and writer and the first black woman employed by the BBC
- Olive Lewin, founder of The Jamaican Folk Singers, author, social anthropologist and teacher
- Donna Parchment Brown, CD, JP, attorney-at-law and former political Ombudsman of Jamaica
- Barbara Blake Hannah, is a pioneering author, journalist, filmmaker, and cultural consultant who famously became the first black television journalist in the United Kingdom, former Jamaican senator
- Lois Samuels, fine artist, ceramicist, photographer, author, and former international supermodel
- Althea Laing, regarded as Jamaica's first homegrown supermodel and educator
- Diana Stewart, OJ, Jamaican business leader, philanthropist, and Chairman of Stewart's Auto Sales Ltd
- Dr Marcia Roye, biotechnologist, molecular virologist, and academic leader and first Jamaican to receive the L'Oreal-UNESCO International Fellowship
- Dr Arlene Laing, Jamaican atmospheric scientist and meteorologist; the first woman and first Jamaican to lead the Caribbean Meteorological Organization, and the first woman from the Anglophone Caribbean to earn a PhD in meteorology.
- Dr Czernie Reid, associated professor, educator, and editor
- Lorna Shelley Williams, Senior Puisne Judge of the Supreme Court of Jamaica
- Deidre Powell, attorney-at-law
- Dorienne Rowan-Campbell, OD, advocate for gender equality, women’s empowerment and organic farming, recipient of the UK Women of the Year Award (1983) and IICA Soul of Rurality Award (2025).
- Phyll Williams, Jamaican fine artist and educator
- Glynis Salmon, media professional, author, publisher
- Major Heleda Thompson, the longest-serving female soldier in the Jamaica Defence Force (JDF)
- Ann-Marie Vaz, Jamaican politician
- Sharon Kenny-Reid, distinguished educator
- Dainalyn Swaby-Bryan, development communication specialist, climate change advocate, podcaster, and cultural ambassador
- Dr. Avis Glaze, Jamaican-born educator, author, and internationally recognized education reformer, former Ontario Education Commissioner and a leading advocate for educational equity and student achievement
- Professor Emerita Yvette Jackson, Jamaican chemist, academic leader, and educator, recognized for her contributions to chemistry education, scientific research, and higher education
- Carol Simpson, attorney and international public servant, recognised for her leadership in intellectual property development, capacity building and regional cooperation through the World Intellectual Property Organization (WIPO).
- Dr. Farrah Simpson, high-energy experimental physicist who made history by becoming the first Black woman to earn a Ph.D. in physics from Brown University

== Past headmistresses ==
- Miss Elizabeth Ramson (1858–84)
- Miss McCutcheon (1885–89)
- Mrs Julia Comrie (Principal)*, Miss Geddes (Headmistress) (1890–93)
- Miss Holden (1894–1904)
- Miss Maud Barrows (1905–22)
- Miss Campbell (1923–34)
- Mrs Ivy Mitchell
- Miss Gloria Wesley-Gammon
- Mrs Joliette Sutherland (1993 – 2003)
- Mrs Heather Murray (2003 - 2017)
- Dr Mahvell Charlton-Brown (2019 - )

* For the period (1890–93) Hampton School had attempted to change its leadership structure, introducing both a Principal and Headmistress in 1890, this was done away with in 1894.
