= Bluefields Beach =

- Beach
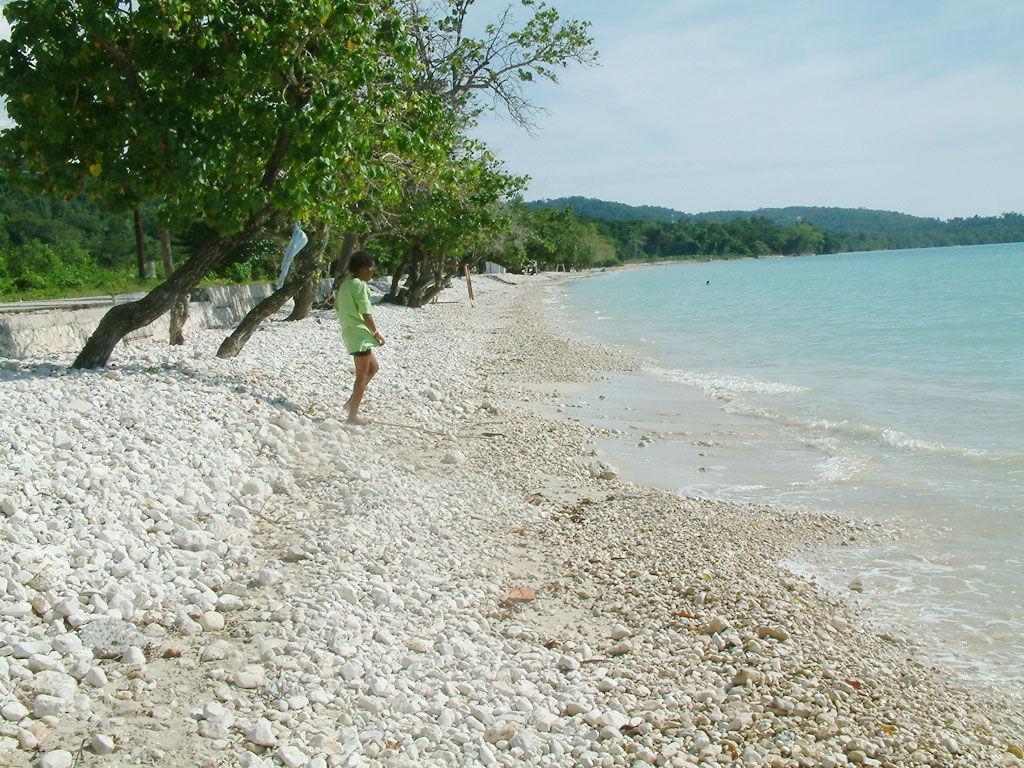
- Bluefields Beach, Westmoreland, Jamaica.

- Location within Jamaica
- Coordinates: 18.1714196°N 78.0305028°W
- Country: Jamaica
- Parish: Wetmoreland
- Time zone: UTC-5 (EST)

Bluefields Beach Park is a public beach in Bluefields in the south-east of Westmoreland, Jamaica. It gets very busy at weekends and holidays.

The old road from Black River to Savanna-la-Mar is separated from the beach by only a low stone wall. However, this old road was replaced by a slightly more inland bypass in the 1990s and one now approaches the beach through gates from a junction at the western end of this bypass. As a result, there is now extensive car parking on the approach road and within a gated beach park. The whole area can become very full on holidays. A further set of gates provides pedestrian access to the old road by the beach.

The beach is narrow and about 1 km long. It has soft white sand and also quite a few stones. The stones may have appeared after Hurricane Dean.

The swimming is generally regarded as very good, although the exposed situation can result in waves if there is a swell.

There is little shade from the sun on the beach and no chairs or umbrellas are on offer. However, the beach park is located in a shady, well-wooded area and offers showering/changing/toilet facilities for a fee. The park also has a number of small restaurants which serve locally caught fish.

== See also ==
- List of beaches in Jamaica
