= Hodges, Jamaica =

Hodges
- Hamlet
- Location within Jamaica
- Coordinates: 18.0486181°N 77.8818065°W
- Country: Jamaica
- Parish: St Elizabeth
- Elevation: 13 m (42 ft)
- Time zone: UTC-5 (EST)

Hodges, Jamaica is located in Saint Elizabeth, Jamaica. It is a small hamlet on the main A2 road (Spanish Town to Savanna-la-Mar) about 2 miles (3.2 km) north-west of Black River. It was the plantation village of Hodges estate which is bordered by the Caribbean Sea to the south and is east of Crawford, Jamaica.

== See also ==
- List of cities and towns in Jamaica
