= Font Hill Beach =

- Beach
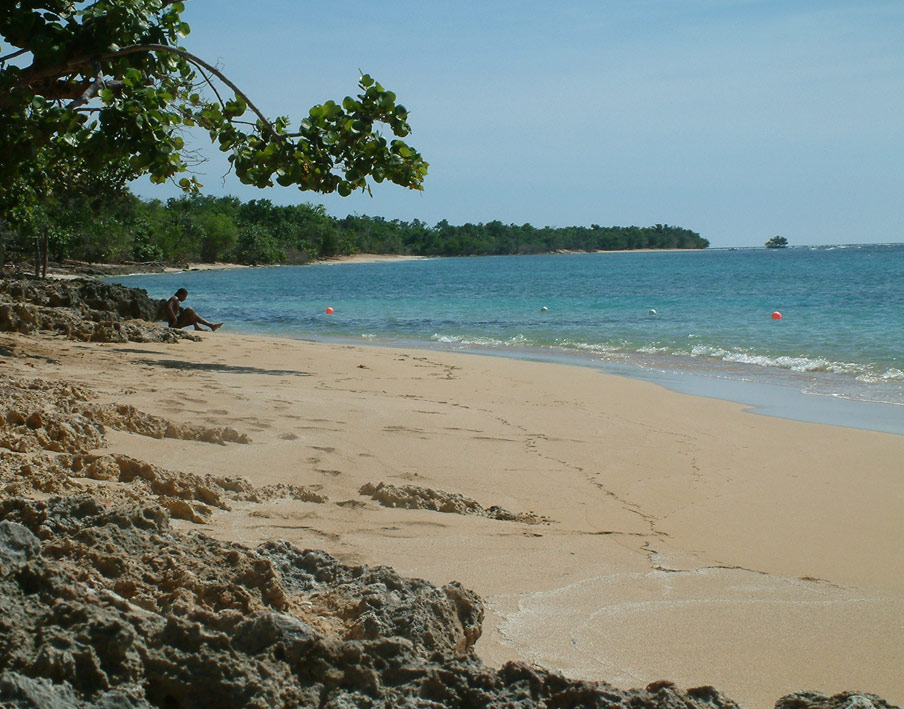
- The golden sands at Font Hill

- Location within Jamaica
- Coordinates: 18.046838°N 77.9472578°W
- Country: Jamaica
- Parish: St Elizabeth
- Time zone: UTC-5 (EST)

Font Hill Beach is located in St Elizabeth, on the south coast of Jamaica, between Black River and White House. It is within a nature reserve on the Font Hill property owned by the Petroleum Company of Jamaica. It is an attractive, well kept beach with clean golden sand and safe swimming in a roped off area. Beyond the rope there is a shallow reef.

Font Hill Beach is sometimes very popular at weekends and holidays, but is usually quiet during weekdays.

The facilities include lifeguards, a grassed area with picnic tables under gazebos, bar, showers, changing rooms and toilets, lockers etc. Entry to the beach park is controlled by a guard and cost J$350 for adults,$175 for children and the group rate is $240 per person (in Sept 2008). It is open 9 am to 5 pm, every day of the week.

Font Hill Beach Park is currently closed to the public until further notice.

== See also ==
- List of beaches in Jamaica
