= Lacovia High School =

Location
- Lacovia, St Elizabeth; Jamaica
- Coordinates: 18.0802°N 77.7607°W

Information
- Motto: Per Ardua Ad Astra (Through Toil to the Stars)
- Founded: 1970
- Founder: Government of Jamaica
- School district: Ministry of Education Region V
- Chairperson: Mr.Valdino Pengs
- Principal: Mr. Andrew Morris- Acting 2022-Present
- Grades: 7 - 13
- Gender: Co-educational
- Age: 12 to 18
- Student to teacher ratio: 21:1
- Hours in school day: 07:00 - 17:00
- Campus size: 8 acres (3.2 ha)
- Nickname: COBY (See Lacovia)
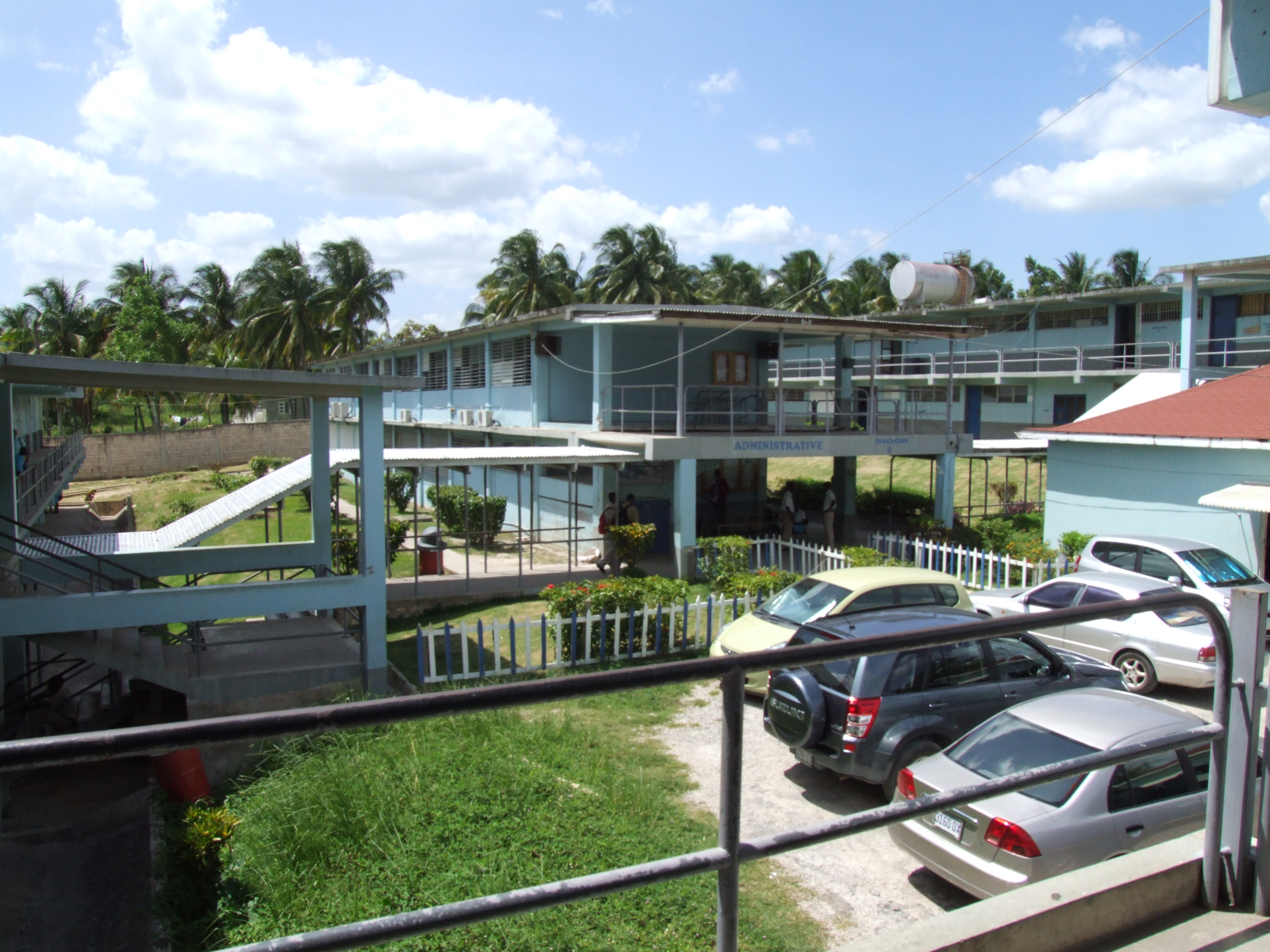

Lacovia High School (COBY) is a government-owned, co-educational, first-to-sixth form, non-traditional, secondary school located in Lacovia in the parish of St Elizabeth, Jamaica. According to Go-Local Jamaica, an online branch of the Jamaica Gleaner newspaper, Lacovia High has recently been noticed by the upper echelons of society. The school has outperformed a number of other well-known similar institutions, with some students sitting CXC and CSEC exams passing in as many as ten subjects.

== History ==
Founded in 1970, when the Hon. Edwin Allen was minister of education, the then Lacovia Junior Secondary, was built by the Jamaican government on eight acres of land to accommodate 650 students from Lacovia and surrounding communities. Over the years the school has changed its name several times as it gradually aligned with traditional high schools.

Many changes and additions have been made to the school building during its nearly 40 years of existence with the most recent block of classrooms completed in 2006. The construction of the new block was financed by the Ministry of Education Youth and Culture at a cost of $JA 14,931,030.75.

Prior to its upgrade to high school status, Lacovia was a relatively unknown entrant in high school competitions. The school now takes part in several inter-school competitions at parish, regional and national levels.

== Today ==
The school accepts students from the parish of St. Elizabeth and from areas within the borders of neighbouring parishes. Almost all CSEC subjects are offered by the school plus other recognized certificates such as NCTVET with Spanish is offered to CSEC level. Over 1600 students attend the school, taught by a staff of over 74 teachers working two shifts.

Lacovia High School has modern science, food and nutrition and computer laboratories funded by the Jamaican government.

Despite achievements in sports and academics, one of the most valued qualities of the school is its comparatively high standard of discipline.

== Curriculum ==
The school offers a broad educational curriculum encompassing academic subjects, vocational training, sports, and various extramural clubs and societies. In its early years, the school provided vocational training in subjects such as auto mechanics, cosmetology, home economics and plumbing. Today, after undergoing several government driven changes, Lacovia High School operates as a traditional high school, focusing on all subject areas of secondary education, while still offering training in vocational subjects.

== Extracurricular activities ==
Students at Lacovia High have access to clubs and societies that include: 4-H Club, DaCosta Cup, Cadet, Red Cross, ISCF, Netball, debate, Girl Guides, Headley Cup, and a quiz club (Schools’ Challenge Quiz, Food and Nutrition, Science, and Heritage).

The school topped Zone E match tables in the 2008 DaCosta Cup, ahead of former champions St. Elizabeth Technical High School and Munro College. The Lacovia team earned a place in the semi-finals and finished third nationwide.

In 2008, Lacovia High advanced to the third round (top 16 schools) in the TVJ’s Schools Challenge Quiz competition. The Lacovia team's performance in the quiz matches augmented the nation's positive view of the school.

That same year, the school won the national art competition sponsored by the Scientific Research Council of Jamaica (SRC).

In recent times, the school has repeatedly won several competitions including: the Associations of Science Teachers of Jamaica (ASTJ) quiz and Exhibition, the 4-H Achievement Day parish competitions, the St. Elizabeth Credit Union Debate and the St. Elizabeth Heritage quiz.

== Emblems ==
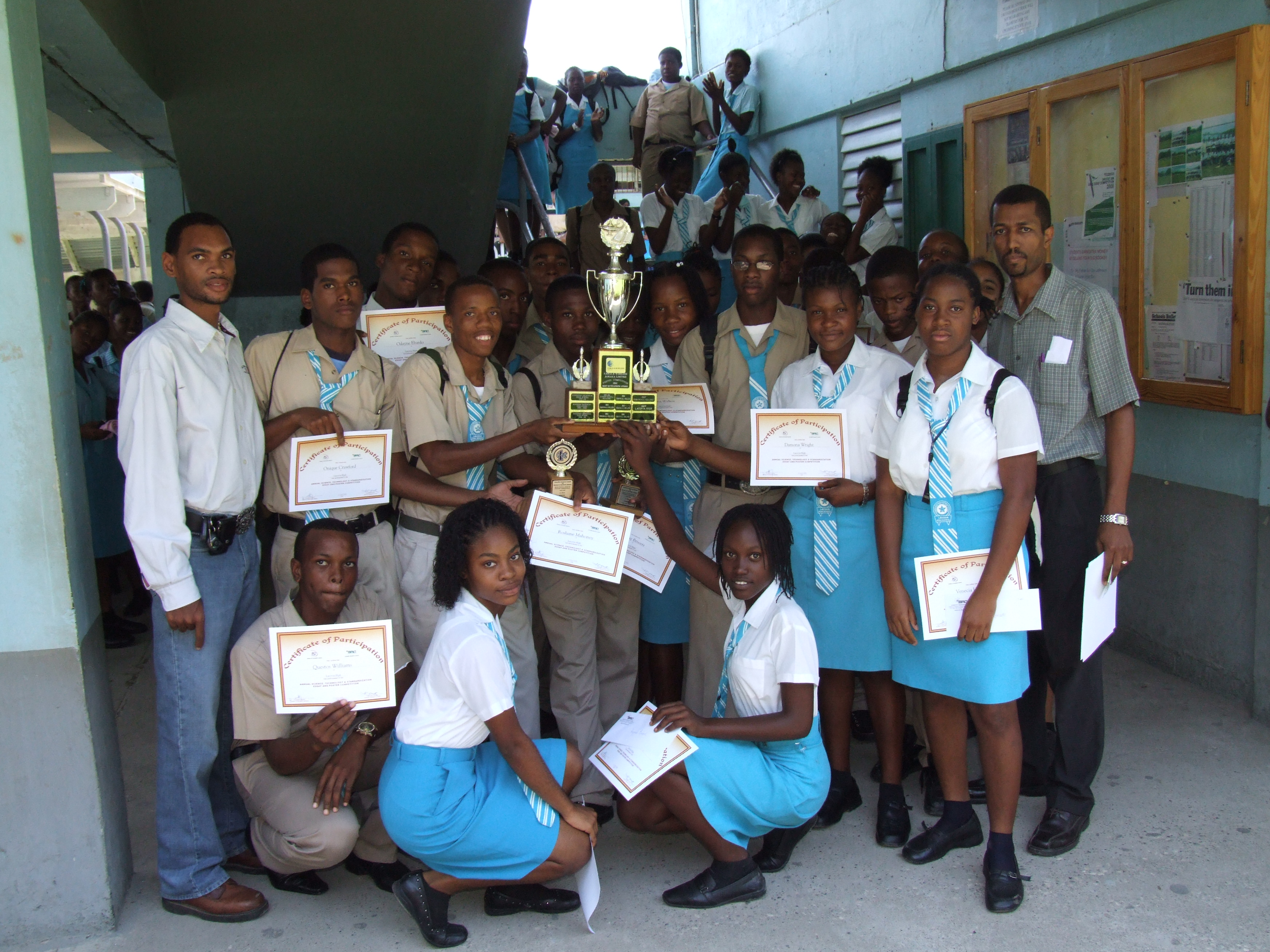
The 2008 art team and coaches display their trophies and certificates, and provide examples of contemporary uniforms.

Colour	Aquamarine
Motto	Per Ardua Ad Astra (Through Toil to the Stars)
Uniform	Girls at the school wear a blouse and tunic in the lower grades) or a blouse and skirt in the upper grades. The blouse of one school shift is blue plaid, while the other is plain white. Tunics and skirts are plain blue. In the past, senior girls wore a yellow skirt and white blouse. Boys on both shifts wear khaki with epaulettes (grades 7–9) or ties (grades 10 and 11). The epaulette or tie is either plaid or plain blue and corresponds with the girls uniform to differentiate the two shifts.

== Principals ==
From its inception to date, Lacovia High has had seven principals:

Mrs V M Falkner	1970–1977
Mr A J Farquharson	1977–1985
Mr Moses L. Dodd	1985–1994
Mrs M L Samuel	1994–1996
Mr Curlew Williams	1996–2003
Mrs Ruby Whyte	2003–2010
Mrs. Hope Morgan Mr. Ricardo Bennett	2010–2018 2018–Present

Mr. Williams is credited with improving the school's science program, while his successor and current principal, Mrs. Whyte has improved the image of the school in the parish and the country at large by encouraging entry to as many inter-school competitions as possible. She has also increased staff motivation resulting in higher CSEC passes and other benefits.

== Gallery ==
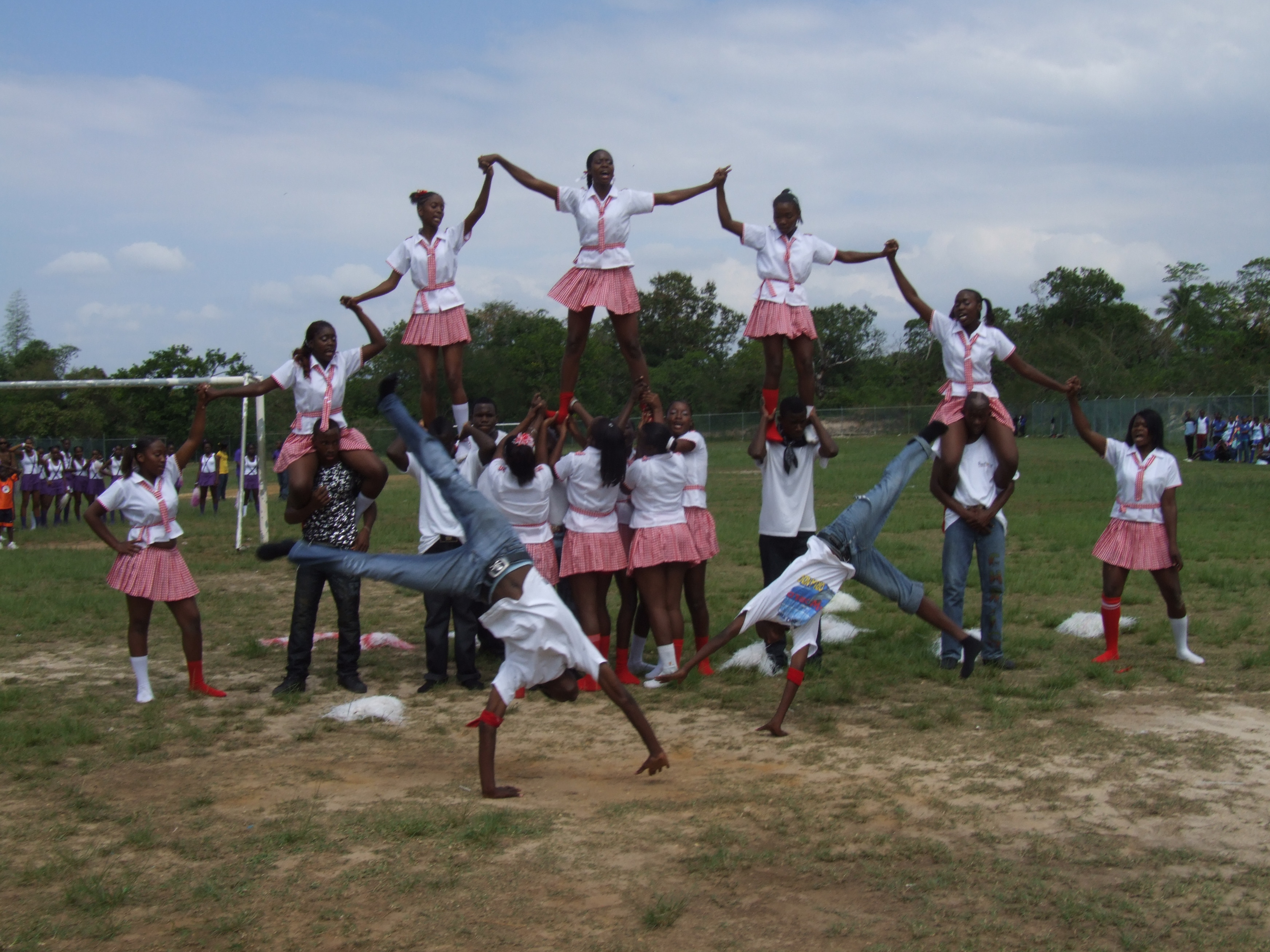
Intra-school cheerleaders competition.

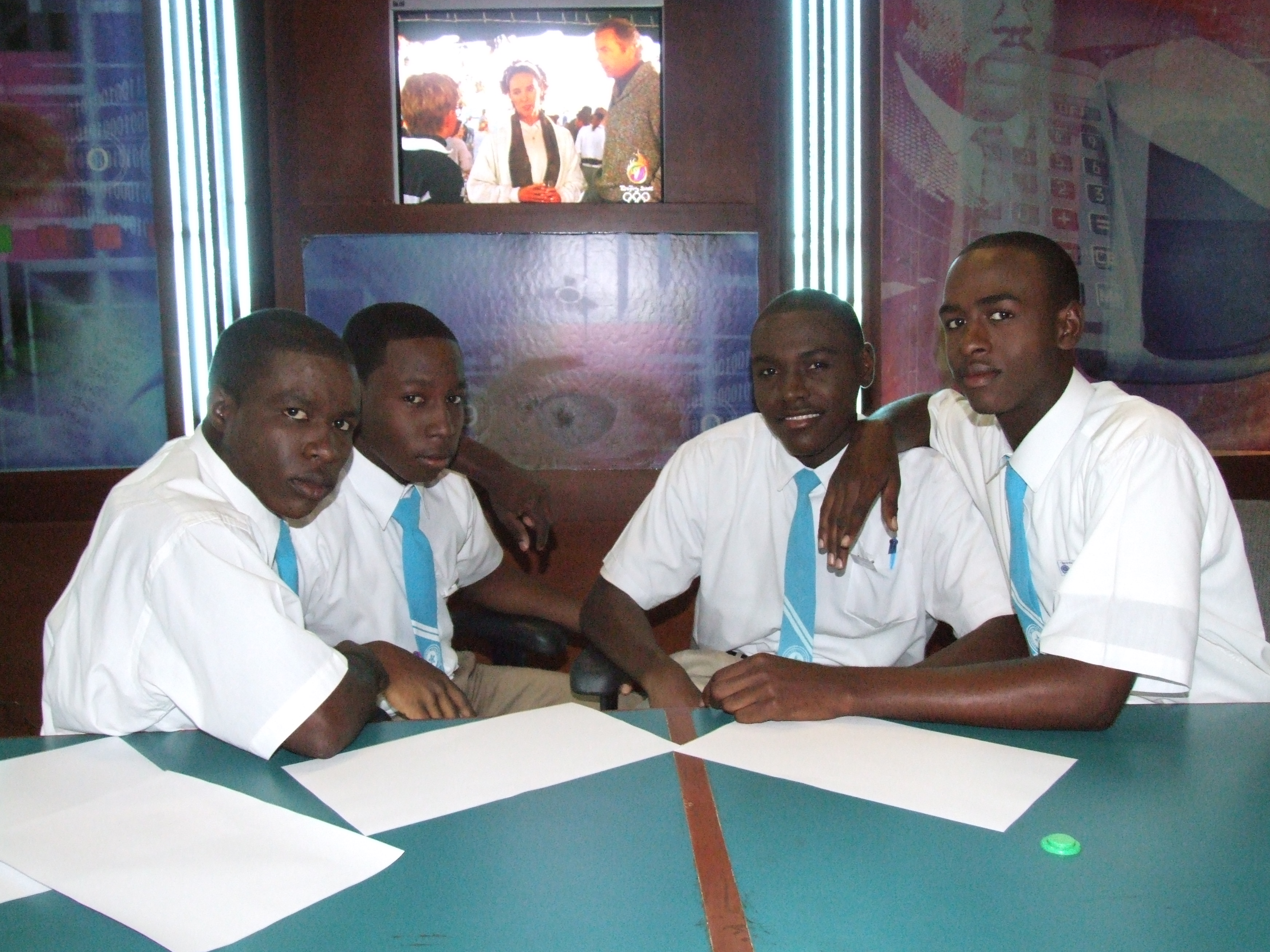
2007–2008 Schools' Challenge Quiz team.

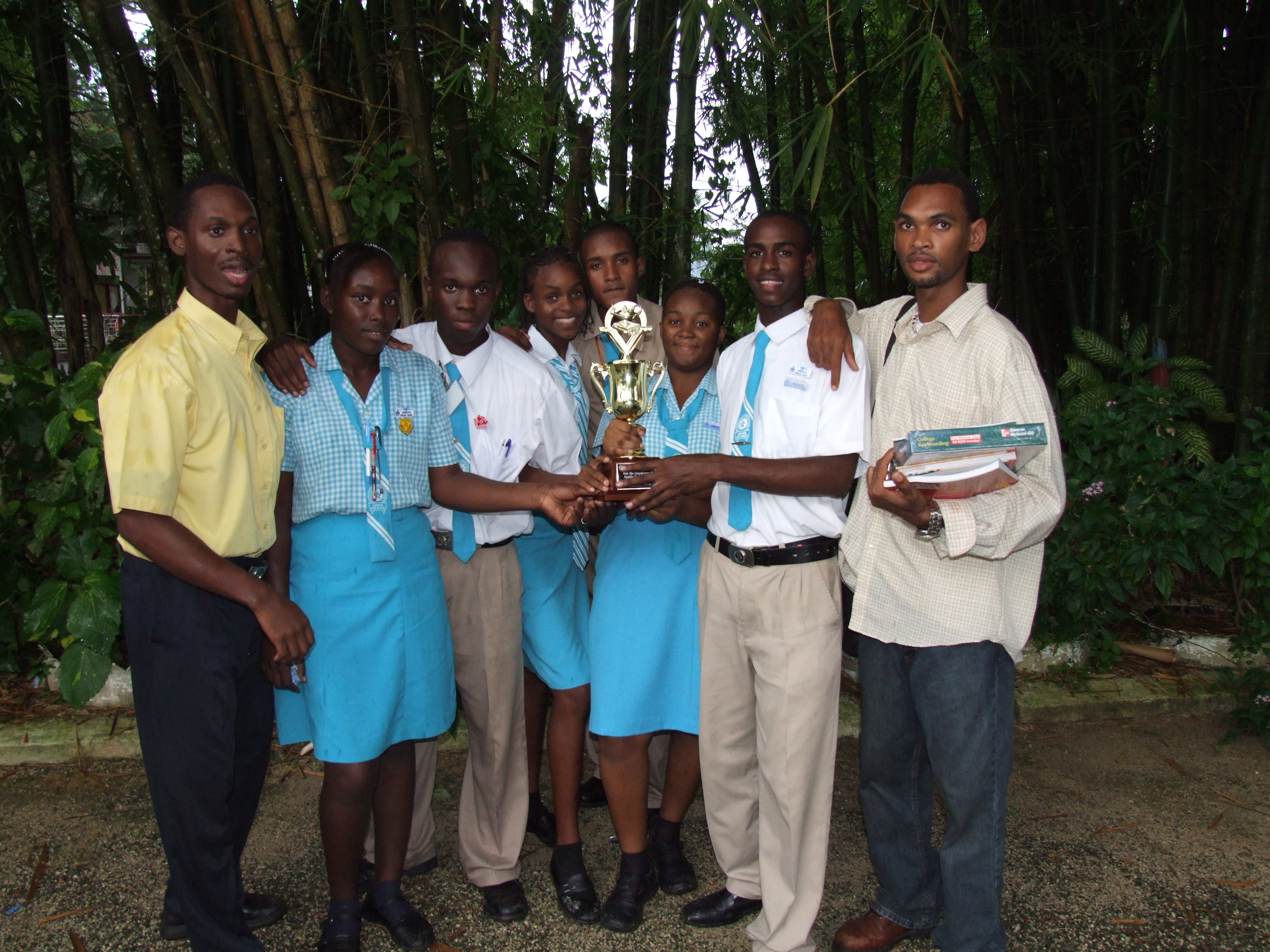
2007 Heritage Quiz winners.

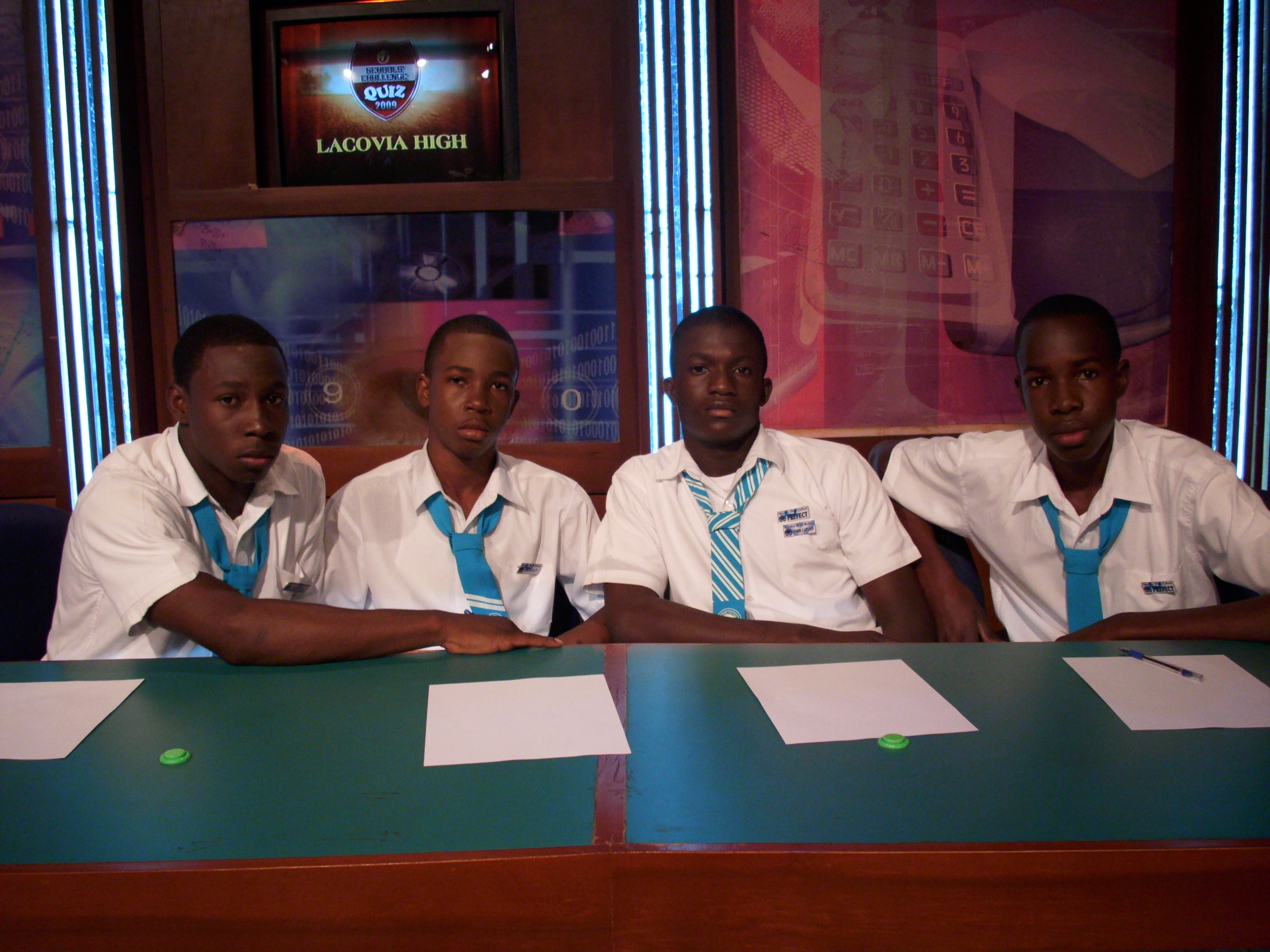
2008–2009 Schools Challenge Quiz team.

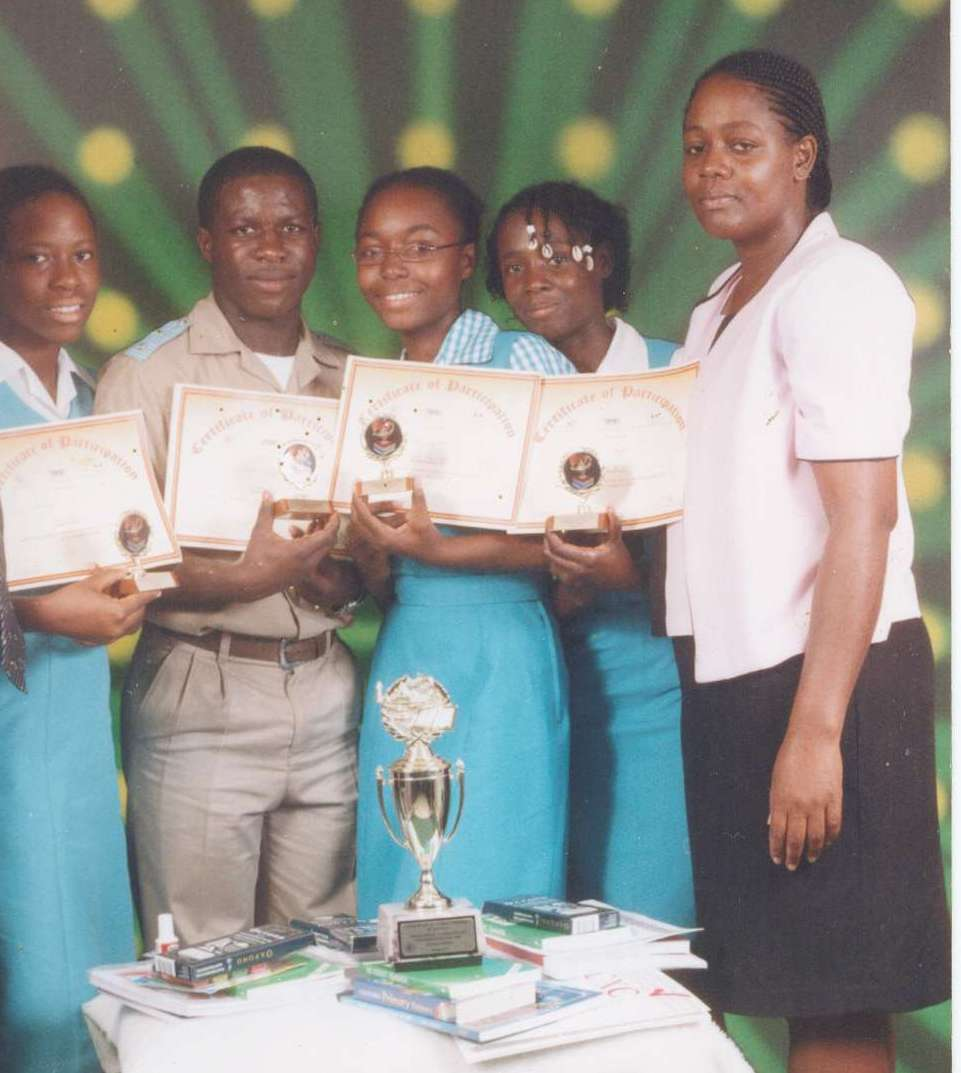
Winning Association of Science Teachers of Jamaica 2005 Science Quiz Competition Junior team and coach.

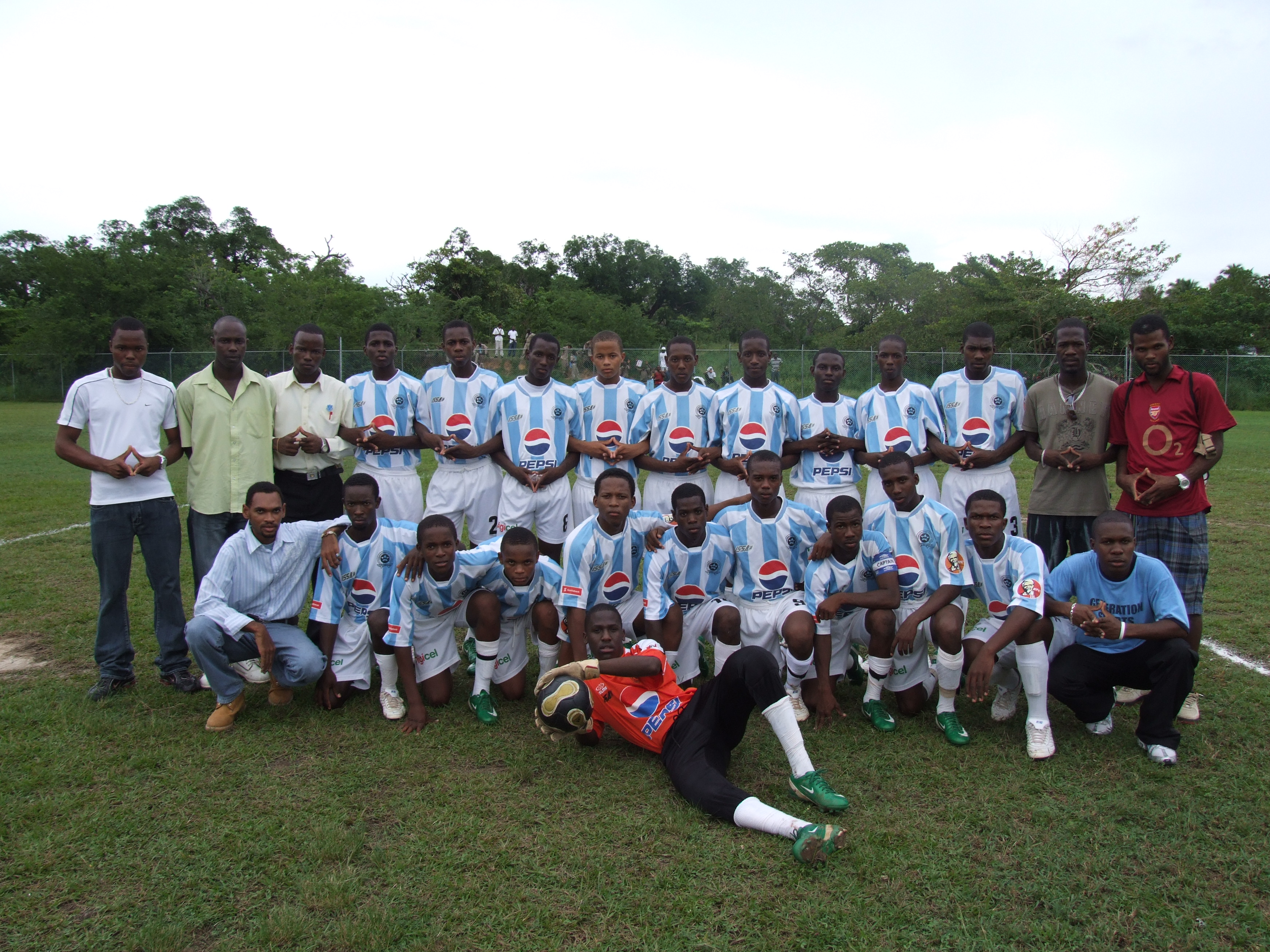
2008 ISSA/Pepsi/-Digicel DaCosta Cup third-placed team.

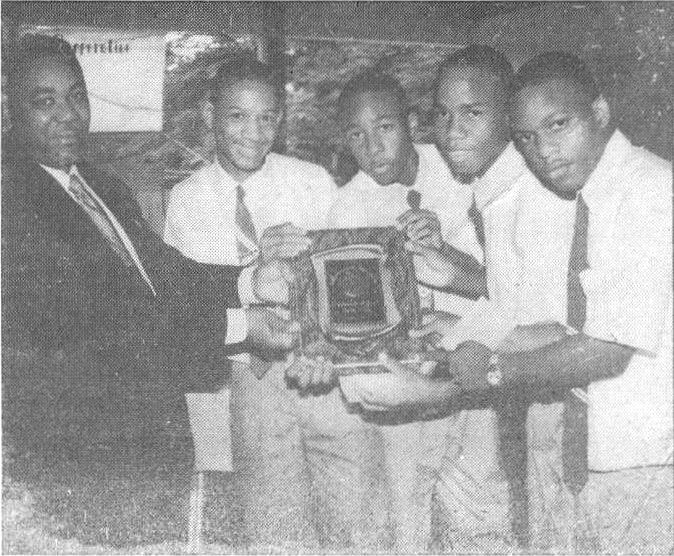
2001 Co-op quiz team. All four went on to the University of the West Indies.
