= Balaclava railway station, Jamaica =

Railway station in Jamaica

Balaclava

General information
- Coordinates: 18.17433°N 77.641770°W
- Owner: Jamaica Railway Corporation
- Line: Kingston to Montego Bay main line
- Platforms: Single
- Tracks: One

History
- Opened: 1892
- Closed: October 1992
Location
- Location within Jamaica

Balaclava railway station opened in 1892 and closed in 1992. It served the small town of Balaclava on the Kingston to Montego Bay line and was 70.5 miles (113.5 km) from the Kingston terminus.

It was built of timber in the Jamaican Georgian architectural style. The upper of the two stories has a gable end roof; an adjoining hip roof has a downward fishtail fretwork on its eaves. The building has sash windows and recessed panel timber doors.

It is on the list of designated National Heritage Sites in Jamaica.

== Opening ==
From the Daily Gleaner of March 24, 1892:

The good people of this busy little ... village had donned their holiday attire on Tuesday last [1892-03-15], ... on the occasion of the arrival of the first passenger train, from Kingston, and although the passengers could have been numbered upon the fingers of one hand, they positively beamed upon them, as if extending a hearty, though silent welcome.

There is nothing imposing about the station itself, - it is merely a stucco and wood building, that could be run up in a very short space of time, - but at the first glance it is noticed that it has been constructed with a view to facilitating goods traffic, rather than for the accommodation of passengers.

The better part of the concrete platform is raised on a level with the flooring of the cars, so that as little trouble as possible will be experienced in loading and unloading the goods-vans with merchandise &c. There is a commodious goods repository running parallel with the track, at this point, whilst the part of the platform reserved for passengers is on a level with the rails, necessitating a certain amount of climbing before taking one's seat in the train.

The descent, of some three feet or so, from the goods portion of the platform to the lower level, is not made by steps, but by a somewhat abruptly sloping incline...

If, day after day, the same punctuality be observed in the arrival of the train as took place on the initial trip, no one, however fastidious and exacting, will have any cause for complaint...

After its long and winding course through the parish of Manchester, the railway at this point enters St, Elizabeth, and Balaclava, though but a couple of miles from the imaginary line of demarcation, is an important trade centre in the latter parish...

== Fares ==
In 1910 the third class fare from Balaclava to Kingston was 5/6 (five shillings and sixpence); first class was about double.

== Accident ==
A serious derailment occurred at this station on July 30, 1938 killing 32 and injuring 70.

== Current use ==
Since 1992 the station buildings have been leased to a small, local woodwork shop. In 2003 it was reported as being in "deplorable condition" and "in need of major repairs". In April 2021 a fire destroyed the main structure.

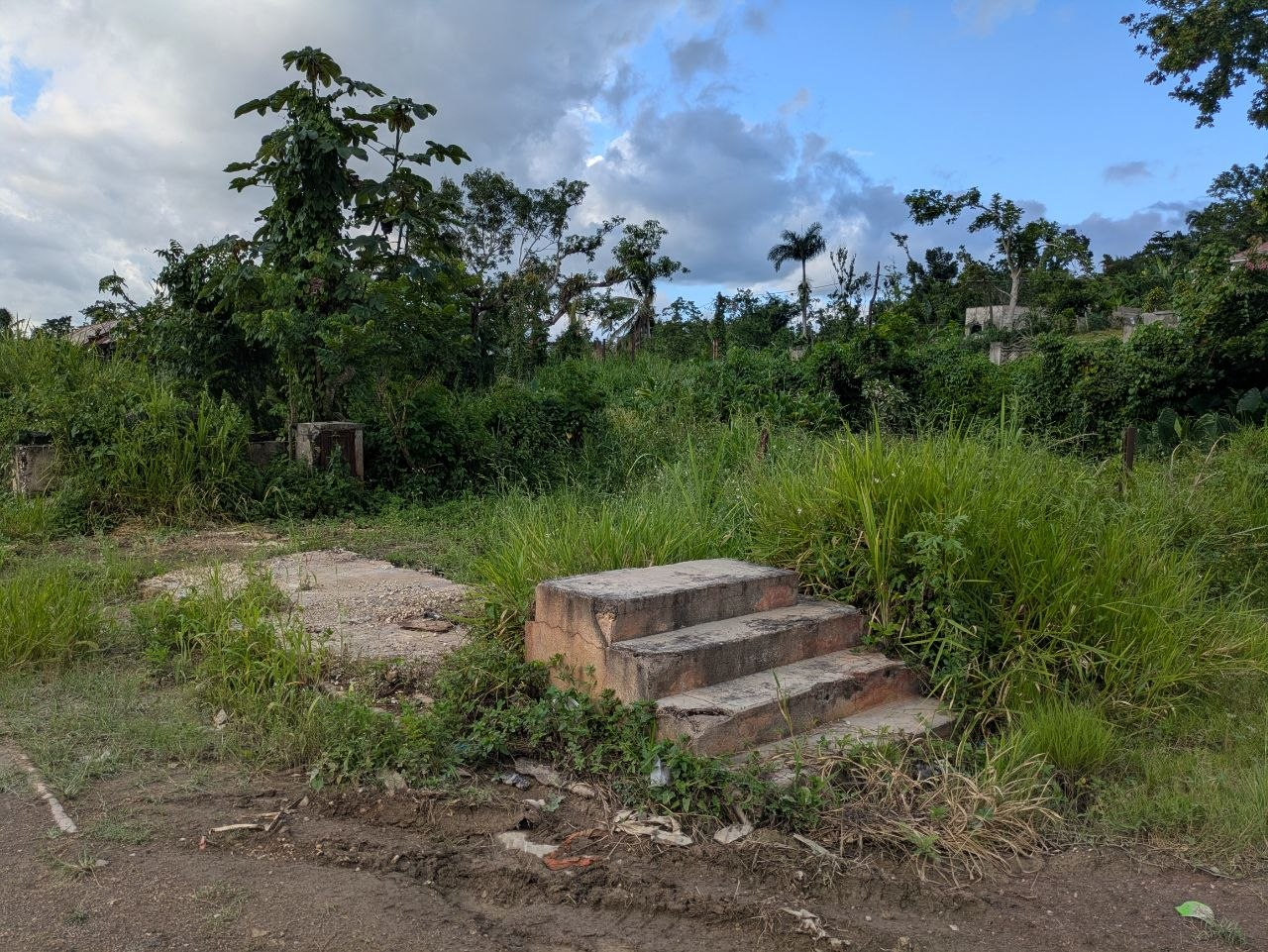
The remains of the Balaclava Railway Station. Taken in May 2026

== See also ==
- Railway stations in Jamaica
- Balaclava, Jamaica
