= List of beaches in Jamaica =

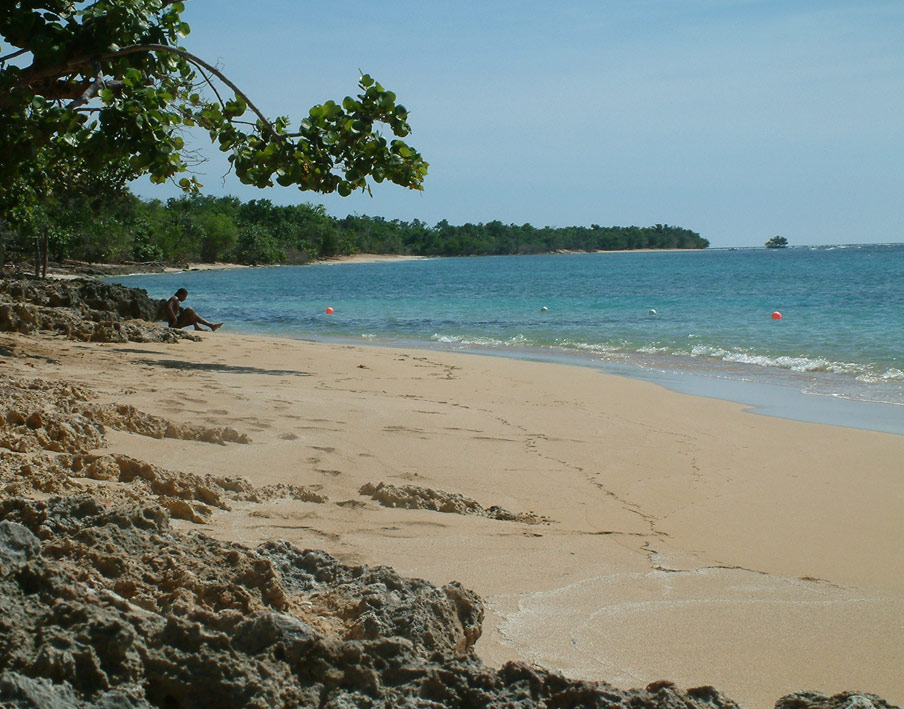
Font Hill Beach, Jamaica

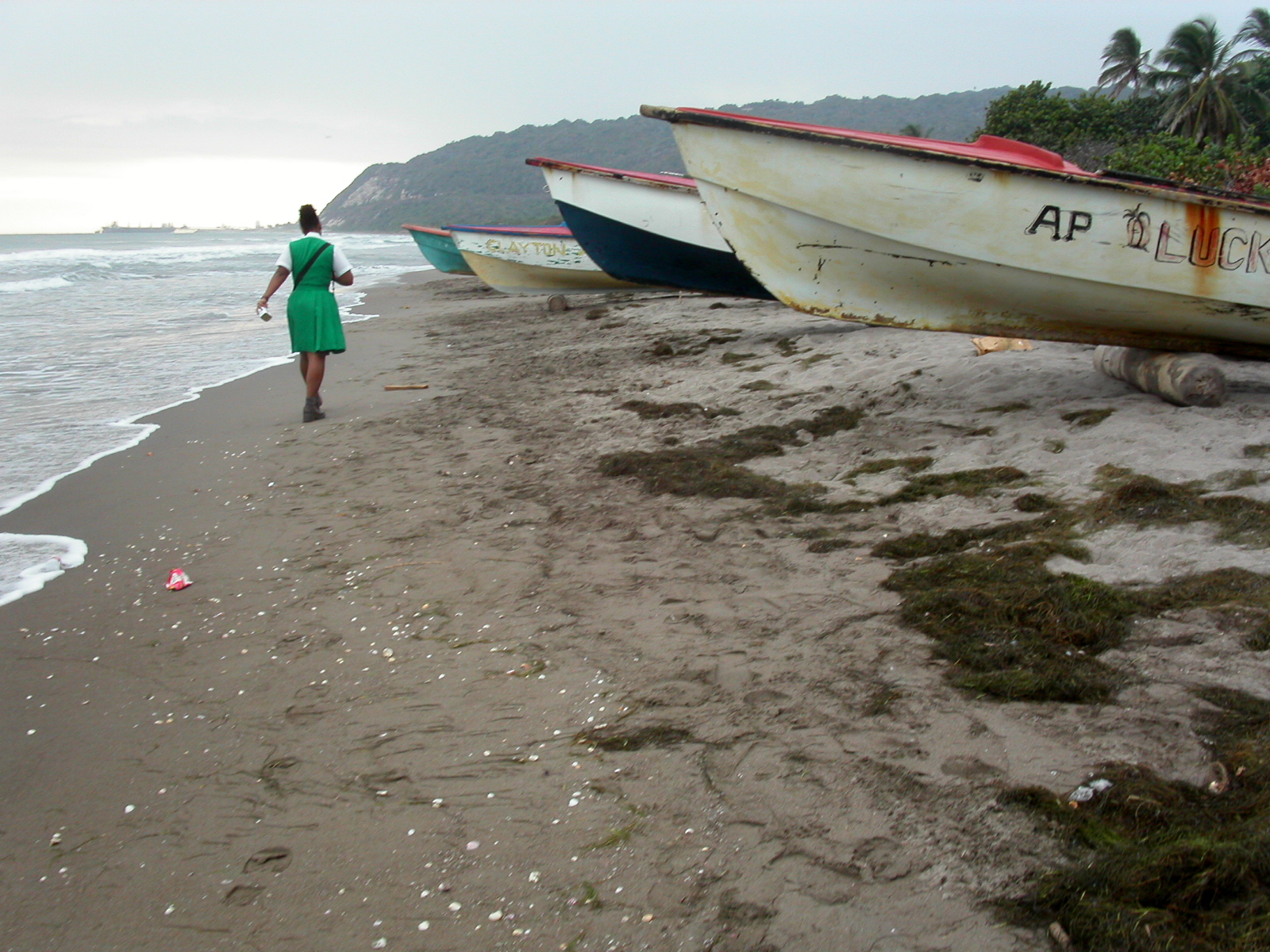
Working coast: The beaches are the hub of economic activity in Alligator Pond. The bauxite exporting Port Kaiser is visible on the horizon.

This is a list of beaches in Jamaica. There are over 50 public beaches in Jamaica. Some make an entry charge (for use of facilities) and have security guards. Many sea-front hotels are able to control access to what is effectively their private beach. They may, for a fee, allow non-residents to gain access and use their facilities.

== Beaches in Jamaica ==
Beaches in Jamaica include the following:

- Alligator Pond, 17°52′16″N 077°34′06″W
- Barnswell Beach, 17°45′02″N 77°08′25″W
- Billys Bay, 17°53′22″N 77°46′49″W
- Bluefields Beach, 18°10′17″N 78°01′50″W
- Boston Beach, 18°09′24″N 76°21′11″W
- Buccaneer Beach, 17°56′43″N 76°45′57″W
- Calabash Bay, 17°52′00″N 77°46′00″W
- Cornwall Beach, 18°29′18″N 77°55′43″W
- Doctor's Cave Beach Club, 18°29′20″N 77°55′42″W
- Farquhars Beach, 17°51′00″N 77°23′00″W
- Font Hill Beach, 18°02′49″N 77°56′50″W
- Frenchmans Bay, 17°52′57″N 77°46′05″W
- Frenchman's Cove, 18°10′32″N 76°24′01″W
- Great Pedro Bay
- Gunboat Beach, 17°56′39″N 76°45′42″W
- Gut River
- Harmony Beach, 18°28′59″N 77°31′13″W
- Hellshire Beach, 17°53′53″N 76°53′39″W
- James Bond Beach, 18°24′41″N 77°05′36″W
- Long Bay Beach
- Negril
- Ocean View Beach
- Puerto Sico Beach, 18°27′48″N 77°23′58″W
- Rose Hall
- Sugarman Beach, 17°53′47″N 76°53′46″W
- Treasure Beach, 17.8760006°N 77.7571964°W
- Whitehouse Beach, 18°06′27″N 77°59′27″W
- Winifred Beach, 18°10′11″N 76°22′30″W

== See also ==
- List of beaches
- List of islands of Jamaica
