= Runaway Bay, Jamaica =

Town in Jamaica

Coordinates: 18°28′N 77°20′W

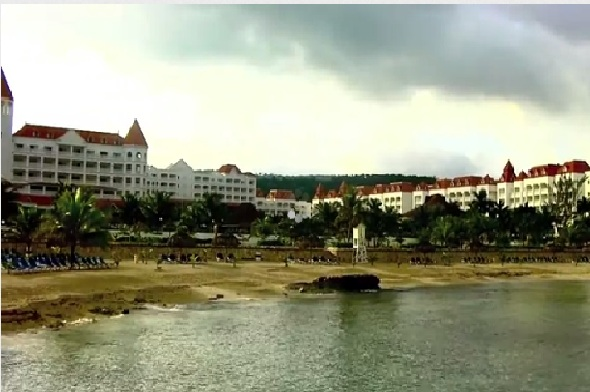
Runaway Bay skyline

Runaway Bay is a town in Saint Ann Parish on the northern coast of Jamaica and is considered one of the most naturally beautiful places on the island. It is a notable tourist destination located 16 km (9.9 mi) west of Ocho Rios, and slightly east of Discovery Bay, where Christopher Columbus landed in 1494. Ocean View Beach is a private beach situated at Runaway Bay. It consists of a series of hotel resort complexes and beaches.

The name derives from its having been an escape route for runaway slaves. Arawakan-speaking people were the first Indigenous inhabitants, but they were eventually overpowered by Spanish colonisers.

The population according to the 2011 census was 8,640, roughly eight times the population of 1,116 determined in the 1970 census.

Notable people born in the town include Canadian actress Samantha Kaine, who appeared in the 2002 film Confessions of a Dangerous Mind. British composer and actor Noël Coward lived in nearby Port Maria and is buried there. Ian Fleming lived in nearby Oracabessa. Not far inland, in the hills south of Runaway Bay, is the village of Nine Mile, which is where Bob Marley was born and spent his childhood.

Reef areas such as the Canyon and Ricky’s Reef can be visited through organized dives offered at most hotels. Its fine offshore diving and snorkeling opportunities are said to be the best in Jamaica. Runaway Bay is a resort community with a good offshore reef, popular with snorkelers and divers. A couple of wrecked aircraft can also be seen in a dive site now known as Ganja Planes.

Runaway Bay is home to an eighteen-hole golf course at Breezes Runaway Bay Resort & Golf Club which has hosted a variety of championship events.

== Etymology ==
The town is named after the Indian slaves who fled from Jamaica to Cuba from Runaway Bay.

Other sources claim the area is named so as it was where Spanish governor Ysasi fled to Cuba when the British invaders closed in.

== History ==
Runaway Bay was the site of the first Spanish settlement on Jamaica and also the point of departure of the last Spanish troops after their 1670 defeat by the British.

Runaway Bay was first developed for tourism in the 1960s with the opening of Cardiff Hall, which is now a housing estate.

On Christmas Day, 1957, the town was the site of a deadly explosion of a tanker loaded with aviation fuel. The tanker had been bound for Sangster International Airport in St. James Parish. A man who had earlier been reprimanded for trying to light a cigarette by constable Joseph Pennant again did so, causing the explosion, which killed 23 people and left a further 70 in hospital in critical condition.

== Geography ==
Between Falmouth and Ochos Rios are two small mini-resorts: Discovery Bay and Runaway Bay. Runaway Bay is dominated by all-inclusive resorts and the more developed of the two bays. Runaway Bay is the smallest of Jamaica’s resort areas. It is 12 miles west of Ochos Rios and 50 miles east of Montego Bay. The one-street village of Runaway Bay is lined with all-inclusive resorts and stretches along the A1 for 3 km, merging with the neighboring community of Salem in the east. The east end of Runaway Bay is referred to as Salem and there is no clear boundary between the villages of Runaway Bay and Salem.
