= Hopewell, Saint Elizabeth =

Human settlement in Jamaica

Coordinates: 17°57′N 77°47′W

Hopewell is a settlement in Saint Elizabeth Parish, Jamaica.
