= Winnifred Beach =

- Beach
- Location within Jamaica
- Coordinates: 18.1696255°N 76.3751078°W
- Country: Jamaica
- Parish: Portland
- Village: Fairy Hill
- Time zone: UTC-5 (EST)

Winnifred Beach is a locally popular public beach in Portland, Jamaica.

A campaign is in progress to keep the beach public in the face of corporate efforts to privatize, develop, and enclose the surrounding area to all but paid access. Anthony Bourdain in his series Parts Unknown, visited and spoke to locals about beach access rights. It was said that unlike most parts of Jamaica, in this area it's permitted to privately own beach land, where other areas typically are public or have public access rights. Winifred beach being one of if not the only remaining publicly accessible beach in the area.

== See also ==
- List of beaches in Jamaica
