= Joyce Robinson =

Jamaican librarian and organization executive

Joyce Lilieth Robinson OJ CD MBE (née Lawson; 2 July 1925 – 12 May 2013) was a Jamaican public servant best known for her work as a librarian. She served for lengthy periods as director of the Jamaica Library Service (1957–1976) and chair of the National Library of Jamaica (1979–1996), and was also briefly general manager of the Jamaica Broadcasting Corporation (1981–1982).

== Early life ==
Robinson was born in Saint James Parish. She was orphaned at the age of six, and initially raised by her maternal grandmother before later being adopted by other relatives. Her adoptive mother was a schoolteacher in Black River, where she received her early education. Robinson moved to Kingston at the age of 12, after winning a scholarship to attend St. Simon's College. She began working as a pupil-teacher when she was 16, and later returned to Black River to work at the local high school, eventually becoming principal. She married mathematics professor Leslie Robinson in 1957, with whom she had two children, Leslie Jr. and Ann.

== Career ==
Robinson joined the Jamaica Library Service (JLS) in 1949, as a library assistant. She completed a course in library science at the British Library Association, and in 1954 was promoted to deputy director. She was made director of the service two years later, the first native Jamaican to hold the post. During Robinson's tenure, the number of public libraries in Jamaica increased from 60 to 442, the number of school libraries from 333 to 853, and the number of qualified librarians from one to 37. In 1973, she was seconded to the National Literacy Programme (NLP) for two years at the request of Prime Minister Michael Manley.

In 1976, Robinson retired as JLS director to become executive director of the Jamaican Movement for Adult Literacy (JAMAL), an expansion of the previous NLP. However, she retained an involvement with libraries as the inaugural chair of the National Library of Jamaica (1979–1996), having been a prominent advocate for its creation. During her time with JAMAL, Robinson also served as vice-president of the International Council for Adult Education for several years. She was appointed general manager of the Jamaica Broadcasting Corporation (JBC) in 1981, but held the position only until the following year, when Prime Minister Edward Seaga commissioned her to run his government's Human Employment and Resource Training (HEART) programme. She retired from the public service in 1991, but continued working as a consultant in literacy and adult education for several more years. She died in May 2013, aged 87.

== Honours ==
Robinson was made a Member of the Order of the British Empire (MBE) in 1959. The Jamaican government made a Commander of the Order of Distinction in 1975, and later inducted her into the Order of Jamaica in 1987; She and her husband were the first married couple to be members of the latter. Robinson also received honorary degrees from Dalhousie University (LL.D., 1979) and the University of the West Indies (LL.D., 1990).
