= Bluefields, Jamaica =

Bluefields
- Town
- Location within Jamaica
- Coordinates: 18.172°N 78.025°W
- Country: Jamaica
- Parish: Westmoreland

Bluefields is a settlement in Westmoreland Parish on the Caribbean island of Jamaica. It contains a major beach, Bluefields Beach.

In Spanish Jamaica, Bluefields was known as Oristan.

The town was named after Abraham Blauvelt, a Dutch-Jewish pirate, privateer, and explorer of Central America and the western Caribbean.

== See also ==
- Bluefields, Nicaragua, also named after Abraham Blauvelt
