= William J.C. Hutchinson =

Jamaican politician

The Honourable William J.C. Hutchinson CD MP

MP for Saint Elizabeth North Western
- In office 18 December 1997 – 3 September 2025
- Succeeded by: Andrew Morris

Personal details
- Party: Jamaica Labour Party

William James Charles Hutchinson is a Jamaican politician from the Labour Party. He was the Minister of State in the Ministry of Transport and Mining.

He retired at the 2025 Jamaican general election.
