= Treasure Beach =

- Beach Resort
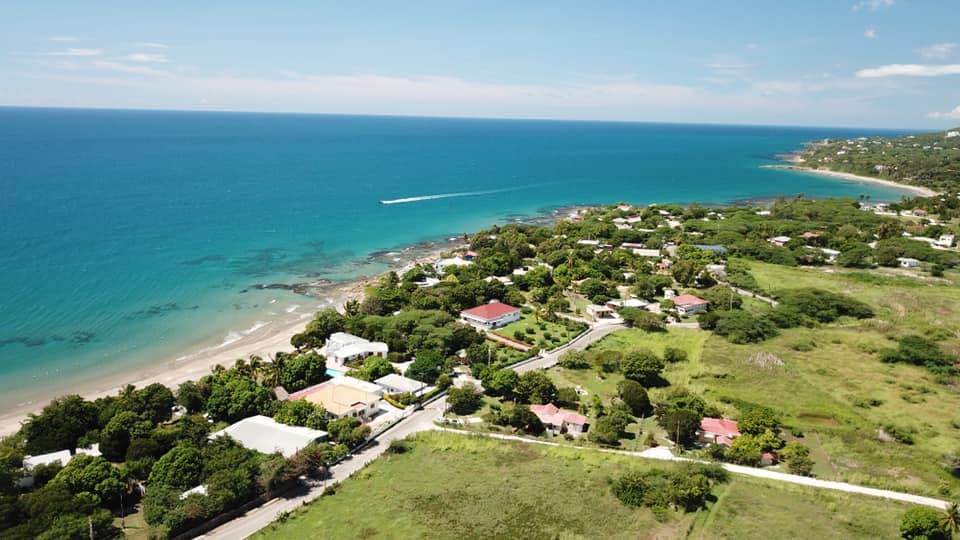
- Treasure Beach, Jamaica

- Location within Jamaica
- Coordinates: 17.8760006°N 77.7571964°W
- Country: Jamaica
- Parish: St Elizabeth
- Time zone: UTC-5 (EST)

Treasure Beach is the name given to a stretch of five Jamaican coves and their associated settlements: Ft Charles, Billy's Bay, Frenchman's Bay, Calabash Bay and Great (Pedro) Bay. Treasure Beach is known as the home of Community Tourism and is devoid of any all-inclusive establishments. Density restrictions don't allow for large hotels and the beaches are all public.

The region is isolated from the main tourist areas and the minor roads connecting with the main highway at Black River or Santa Cruz tend to suffer damage in heavy rain, but are usually passable with care. The roads have been rehabilitated and are now better than in previous years. There are numerous small hotels and guest houses serving tourists seeking a very quiet seaside location.

Hurricane Beryl hit the villages on July 3, 2024 and caused a great deal of damage to the area.

== History ==
The beach resort takes its name from "The Treasure Beach Hotel" built & opened by a Canadian man (Ernest George Hamilton Dicker) who was invited by the Senior Family in the early 1900s. It went on to become the name given to five bays and settlements in the surrounding area.

== Fort Charles Bay ==
Fort Charles Bay is the first beach you get to from Black River. The beach is 18 km (11 miles) long and is used for swimming.

== Billy's Bay ==
Billy's Bay is 3 km (2 miles) east of Fort Charles Bay and is the second fishing beach and settlement reached when approaching Treasure Beach from Black River.

== Frenchman's Bay ==
Frenchman's Bay is the second beach and settlement reached when approaching Treasure Beach from Black River.

There are a number of small, bustling restaurants.

== Calabash Bay ==
From the Pedro Bluff heading west, it’s the second of the bays, after Great Bay, a quaint little fishing settlement with a population of about 3000.

Calabash bay is a 600m long beach has a narrow strip of brown sand mixed with magnetite (black sand). The swimming is good, but since the beach is open to the south, small breakers sometimes appear when it’s windy. Tourists seeking to escape the all-inclusive-shut-in-the-hotel experience find this area of the island most satisfying.

There are a few simple restaurants in the village.

The former Old Wharf Hotel housed a residential treatment facility named Tranquility Bay.

== Great (Pedro) Bay ==
Great Pedro Bay is the most easterly of the settlements and beaches that make up Treasure Beach. The road ends here, regardless of where you are coming from.

== See also ==
- List of beaches in Jamaica
- Perry Henzell
