= Holland Bamboo =

Coordinates: 18.1167°N 77.8078°W

Location of Holland Bamboo in Jamaica

Holland Bamboo is a settlement in Saint Elizabeth Parish in Jamaica.
