= Ocean View Beach =

- Beach
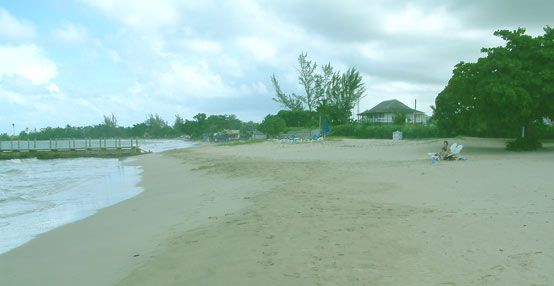
- Ocean View Beach.

- Location within Jamaica
- Coordinates: 18.4643449°N 77.3263854°W
- Country: Jamaica
- Parish: St Ann
- Time zone: UTC-5 (EST)

Ocean View Beach is a private beach located in Runaway Bay in St Ann, Jamaica. It offers a good standard of facilities and swimming, for a fee.

The beach features a very broad swath of golden sand, and a large buoyed swimming area, which can get a bit choppy if wind and wave conditions are unfavourable. Almond trees provide a considerable amount of shade.

There are clean showering/changing/toilet facilities and two small bars/snack shops. Loungers are available free of charge.

Located on the dual carriageway North Coast Highway, immediately to the east of Breezes Hotel, access to the beach is controlled by the Cardiff Hall Owners' Association.

Hagglers' stalls are located beyond the eastern fringe of boundary of the beach, and unless one ventures too close there is little disturbance from hawkers. However, a few hawkers also seem to congregate at the western end, along the boundary with Breezes Resort.

== See also ==
- List of beaches in Jamaica
