= Aberdeen, Jamaica =

Town in Saint Elizabeth, Jamaica

Aberdeen is a location in Jamaica getting its name from the Aberdeen Estate. It is in Saint Elizabeth Parish.

== History ==
The Aberdeen Estate was originally leased by Alexander Forbes from Alexander MacFarlane from 1736 to 1755. Forbes was the white superintendent of the Jamaican Maroons town of Accompong from 1773 until the end of the century.

By 1772, Forbes owned the estate outright, and he built a Great house around the 1740s. The enslaved Africans on the estate became Moravians following the missionary work by this Protestant group. Following emancipation these people moved off the estate and established the modern settlement of Aberdeen, retaining their links to the Moravian church.

Aberdeen lies on the edge of Cockpit Country. In the first half of the 1800s, runaway slaves created the community of Me-no-Sen-You-no-Come on the land of Aberdeen in the Cockpit Country.
