= Alligator Pond =

- Fishing village
- Location within Jamaica
- Coordinates: 17°52′16″N 077°34′06″W
- Country: Jamaica
- Parish: Manchester
- Elevation: 0 m (0 ft)

Population (1991)
  - Total: 1,542
  - Estimate (2010): 1,826
- Time zone: UTC-5 (EST)

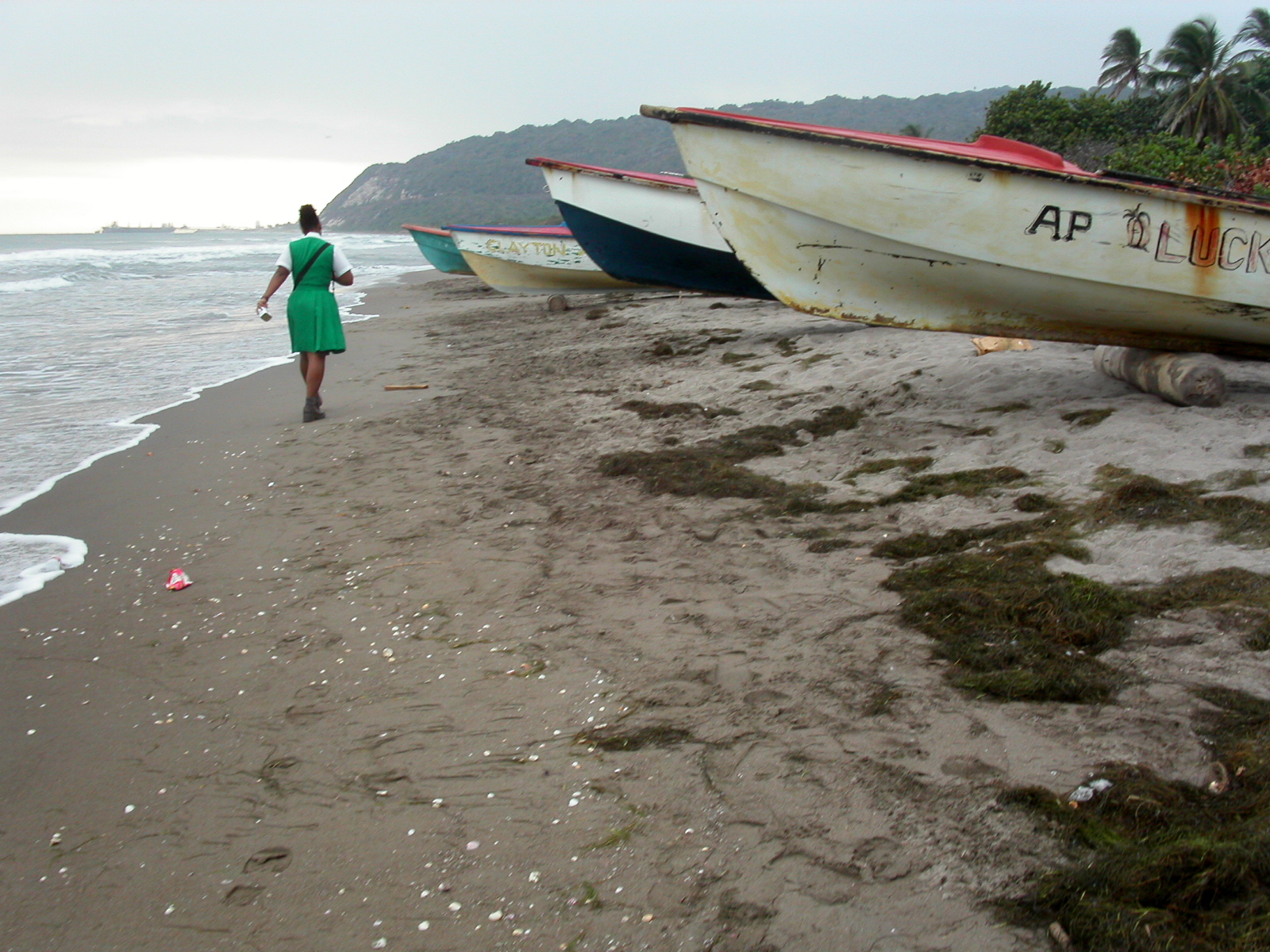
Working coast: The beaches are the hub of economic activity in Alligator Pond. The bauxite exporting Port Kaiser is visible on the horizon.

Alligator Pond is a fishing village on the southwestern coast of Jamaica in the parish of Manchester.

Unlike the tourist-oriented coasts in the northern part of the country, Alligator Pond's shoreline is balanced between work and recreational activities; here, fishermen launch their boats to catch fish, often regarded as the freshest on the island while women conduct the wholesale business of the catch. Weather-worn cookshops and bars line the sand's edge, supplying food staples such as curried goat and Red Stripe beer.

== Geography ==
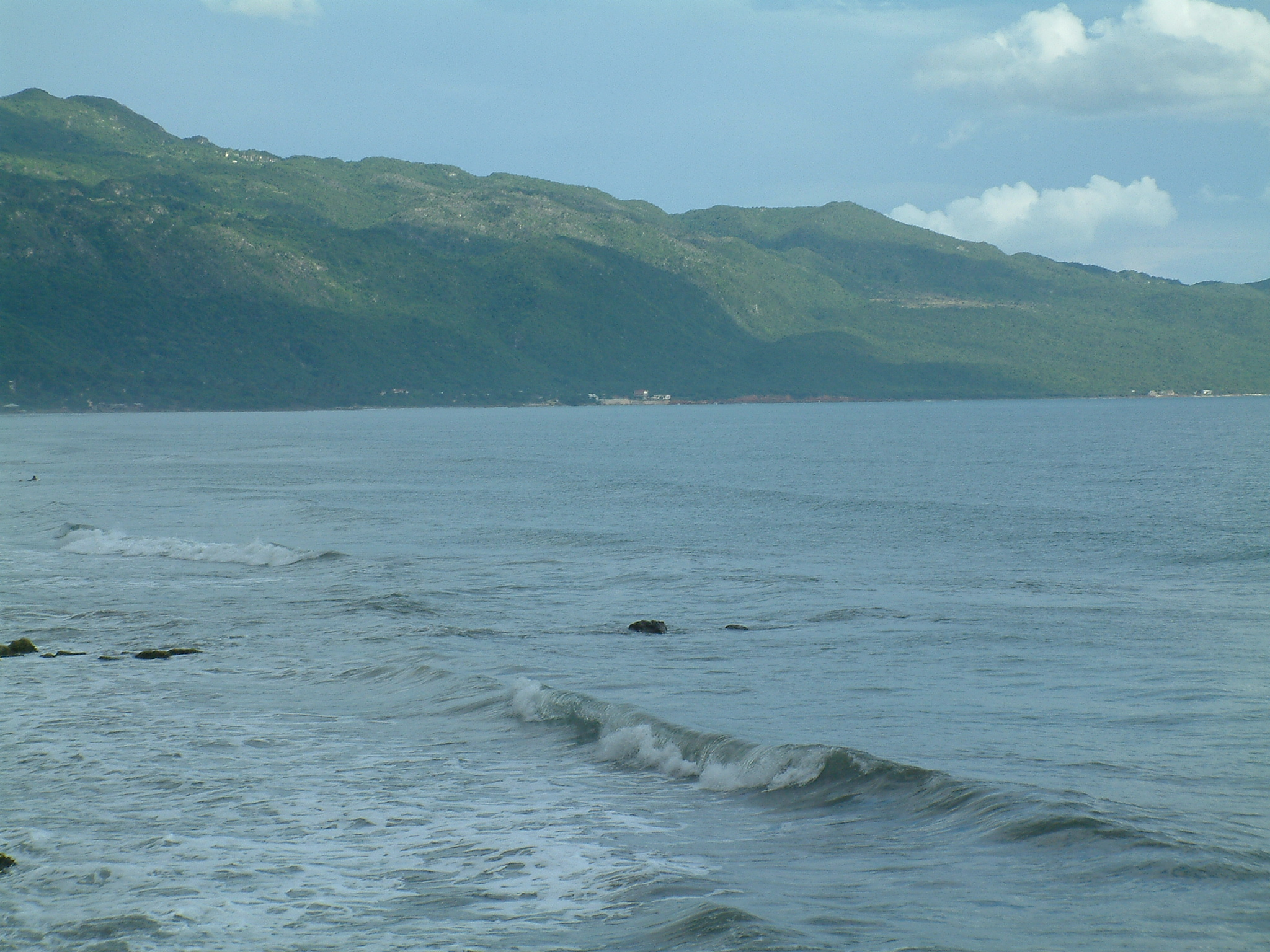
Hills like alligator's back

Alligator Pond lies at the foot of the Don Figueroa Mountains to the north-east, some 35 km from Mandeville. The name is said by locals to derive from the shape of the mountain range, which viewed from the beach has bumps which suggest an alligator's back.

The Alligator Pond River is a bathing spot about 3.2 km (2 miles) west of the village off the road leading to Port Kaiser.

== The Little Ochie ==
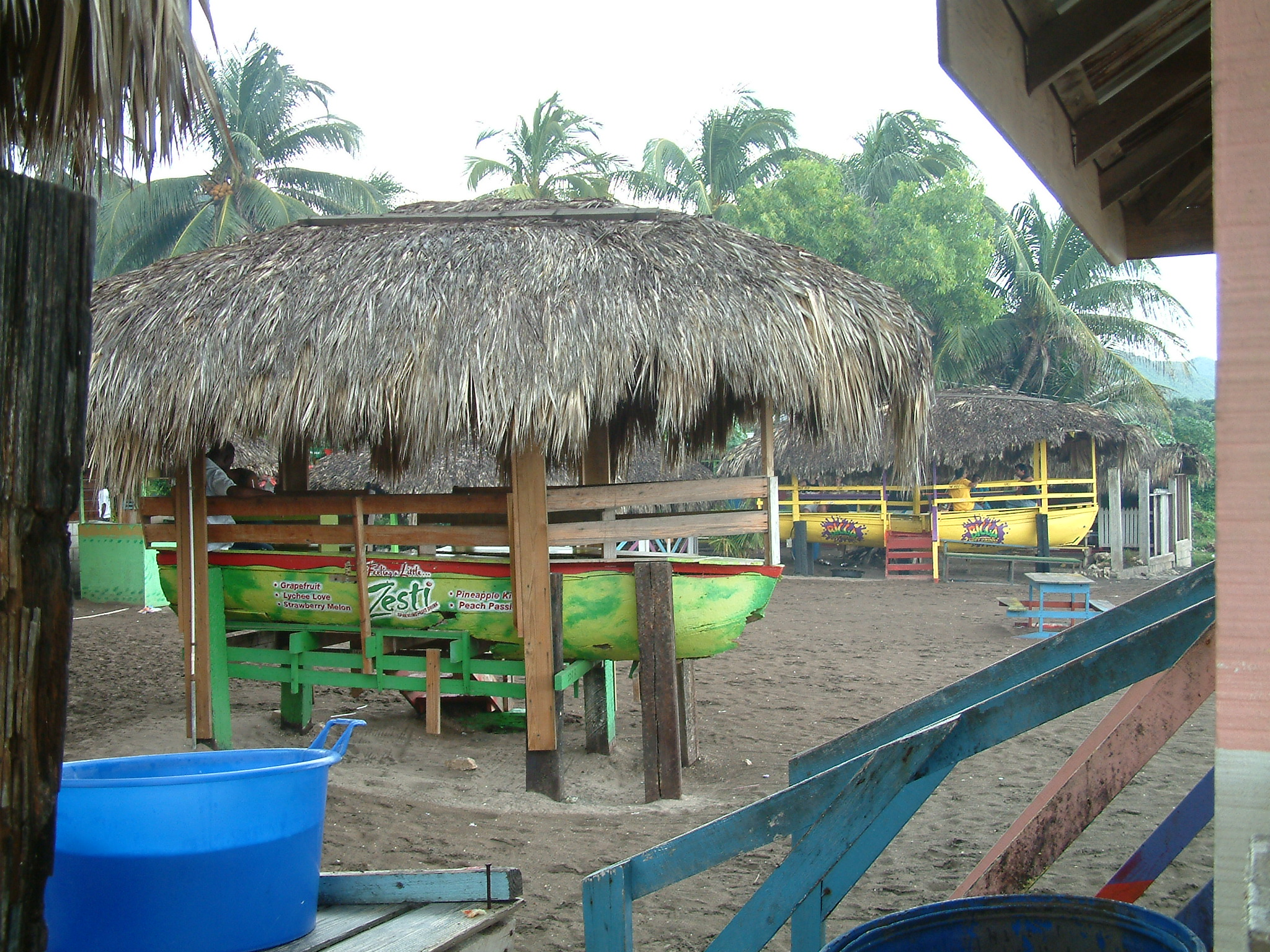
The Little Ochie restaurant on the beach

The Little Ochie, a fish restaurant, is located in several huts on the beach, some made from the hulls of fishing boats with thatched roofs. It has expanded to seat several hundred and attracts a clientele from far and wide, including some tourist tours.

== See also ==
- List of cities and towns in Jamaica
- List of beaches in Jamaica
