= Lacovia =

Human settlement in Jamaica

Coordinates: 18.0740828°N 77.7555013°W

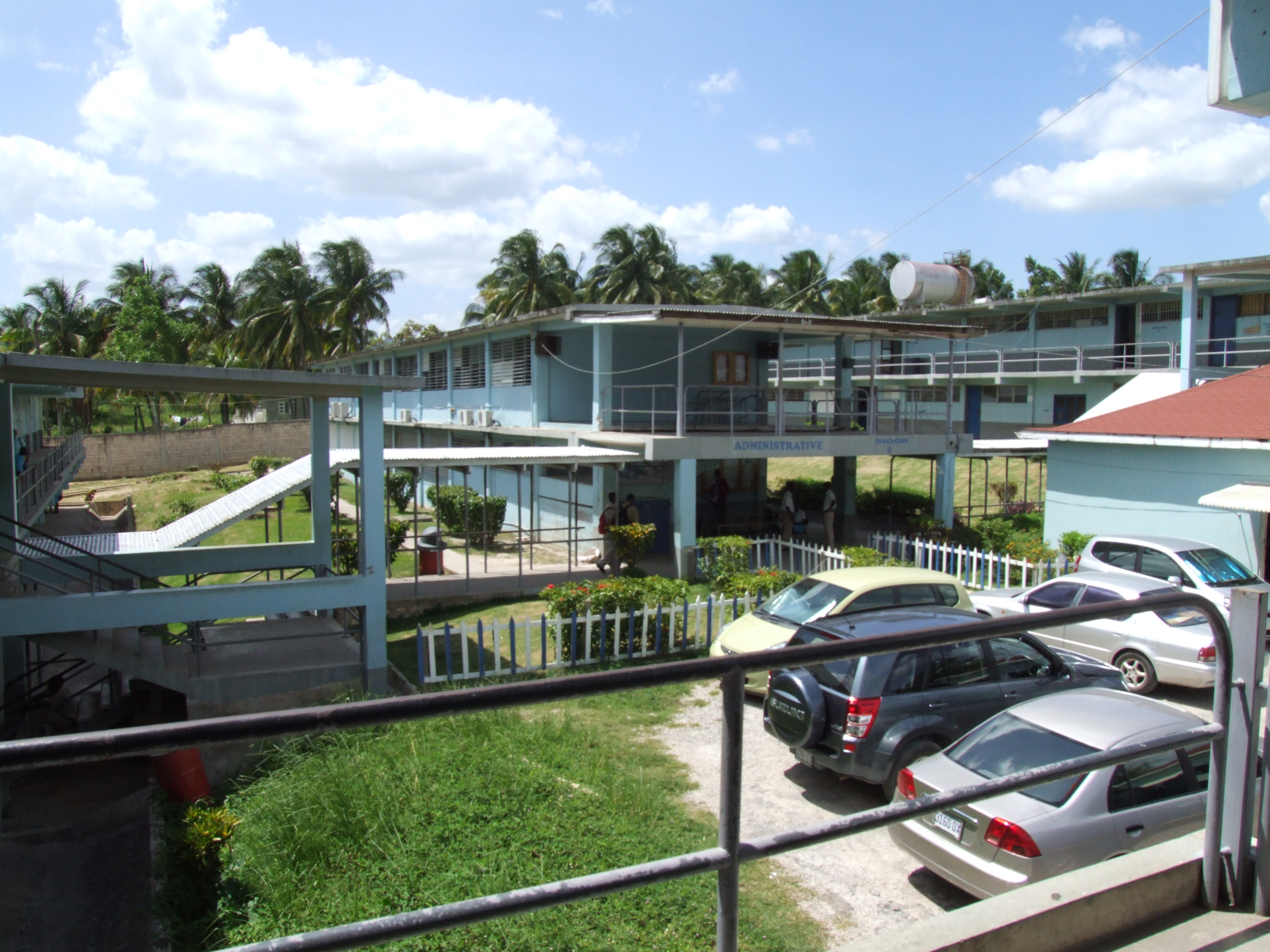
Lacovia High School

Lacovia is a town in St Elizabeth, Jamaica, located on the Black River between the Upper Morass and the Lower Morass.

== History ==
The name derives from La Caoban, the name of the place during the Spanish occupation. Following the English invasion it was called Coby. In 1784 it consisted of 20 houses and was the first capital of Saint Elizabeth, being the home of the Quarter Sessions and Petty Courts.

It was the home of a group of enslaved Madagascans who left the locality to join the Maroons prior to the First Maroon War.

== Amenities ==
Lacovia High School, a government-own secondary school, is the town's largest educational institution.

== Other uses ==
The name also refers to a condominium situated on Seven Mile Beach, Grand Cayman. It was also called Lacobeyah meaning 'land of wood and water.'
