= Long Bay Beach =

- Beach
- Location within Jamaica
- Coordinates: 18.0975749°N 76.3106564°W
- Country: Jamaica
- Parish: Portland
- Time zone: UTC-5 (EST)

Long Bay Beach is a 1 mile crescent of white sand on the east coast of Jamaica in Portland Parish. Long Bay Beach is the site of the Annual Long Bay Gala, held on Independence Day August 6th each year. The Long Bay community is represented by the Long Bay/Fair Prospect Citizens Association.

The area has several guest houses. The beach has several bars as well as cook shops and a restaurant. Surfing is a popular sport; including tube surfing.

Other amenities include a petrol station, a library and a post office.

== See also ==
- List of beaches in Jamaica
