= Cornwall County, Jamaica =

Historic county of Jamaica

Coordinates: 18.27°N 77.86°W

Cornwall
- County
- Country: Jamaica
- County town: Savanna-la-Mar
- Established: 1758
- Named for: Cornwall, England

Area
  - Total: 3,939.3 km^{2} (1,521.0 sq mi)

Population
  - Total: 600,581

Map of parishes and counties. The county of Cornwall is shown in green.

Cornwall is the westernmost of the three historic counties into which Jamaica is divided. It is the least populated county of the country. It has no current-day administrative significance. It includes Montego Bay, the island's second largest city by area.

== History ==
Jamaica's three counties were established in 1758 to facilitate the holding of courts along the lines of the British county court system. Cornwall, the westernmost, was named after the westernmost county of England. Savanna-la-Mar was its county town.

== Parishes ==
Cornwall County
On map	Parish	Area km^{2}	Population; Census 2011	Capital
1	Hanover	450.4	67,037	Lucea
2	Saint Elizabeth	1,212.4	146,404	Black River
3	Saint James	594.9	175,127	Montego Bay
4	Trelawny	874.6	73,066	Falmouth
5	Westmoreland	807.0	138,947	Savanna-la-Mar
	Cornwall County	3,939.3	600,581
	Jamaica total	10,990.5	2,607,631	Kingston
