= Bethlehem Moravian College =

Bethlehem Moravian College, Jamaica
- Motto: Latin: Mihi Cura Futuri
- Motto in English: "My Care is for the Future"
- Type: Public
- Established: 1861; 165 years ago
- Chairman: Lowel Morgan
- Principal: Albert Corcho
- Location: St. Elizabeth, Jamaica; 17.969716°N 77.697095°W
- Campus: Rural
- Website: www.bmc.edu.jm

Bethlehem Moravian College (formerly Bethlehem Teacher Training College) is a college located in Malvern, Jamaica. The college grants the bachelor's degree in primary and secondary education, business studies, and hospitality and tourism management. The college was founded in 1861 by the Jamaica Province of the Moravian Church.
