= Balaclava, Jamaica =

Balaclava
- Small Town
- Flag Coat of arms

- Location within Jamaica
- Coordinates: 18.1705429°N 77.6483631°W
- Country: Jamaica
- Parish: St Elizabeth
- Elevation: 251 m (823 ft)

Population
  - Estimate (2009): 2,786
- Time zone: UTC-5 (EST)

Balaclava is a small town in Northern St Elizabeth parish, Jamaica. It used to be an important town in the north of the parish.

Balaclava has a lively, outdoor Market. The St Luke Anglican Church, where many victims of the infamous Kendall Train Crash (1957) are buried, is a historical treasure and museum.

Nearby the village of Marlborough Hill offers great scenic walks and tranquility. The Armstrong bar provides relaxation, local entertainment and great conversation with everyday Jamaicans. The town was established around the plantations of the Arscott & Sherman families in the late 18th century. Graves of these families can be found in the cemetery of St.Luke's Anglican church. One of the plantation style houses still remains, and commands sweeping views of the Appleton Estate (Rum)sugar cane fields, as well as the foothills of the Cockpit Country. The nearby districts are Russell Hill, Wallingford and Oxford.

== Transport ==
=== Road to Balaclava ===
The B6 (Montpelier to Shooters Hill) runs through Balaclava.

=== Rail ===
==== Station ====
The now disused Balaclava railway station served the Kingston to Montego Bay main line. The station opened 1892 and closed in October 1992 when all passenger traffic on Jamaica's railways abruptly ceased.

==== Train accident ====
A serious train derailment occurred at this station on 30 July 1938 killing 32 and injuring 70.

== See also ==
- Railway stations in Jamaica
- Lists of rail accidents
