= Andrew Morris (Jamaican politician) =

Jamaican politician

MP for Saint Elizabeth North Western
- Incumbent
- Assumed office 3 September 2025
- Preceded by: William J.C. Hutchinson

Personal details
- Party: Jamaica Labour Party

Andrew Morris is a Jamaican politician from the Jamaica Labour Party who has been MP for Saint Elizabeth North Western since 2025.
