= Southfield, Jamaica =

- Town
- Location within Jamaica
- Coordinates: 17.8805°N 77.6735°W
- Country: Jamaica
- Parish: St Elizabeth
- Elevation: 568 m (1,863 ft)

Population
  - Total: 2,623
  - Estimate (2018): 4,370
- Time zone: UTC-5 (EST)

Southfield is a farming town on the southern ridge of the Santa Cruz Mountains in St Elizabeth, Jamaica.

== History ==
Southfield was originally the site of a plantation. This, together with its Great House was well established by 1796 when Andrew Bromfield was listed as the proprietor with 80 African slaves. By 1922 this had been renamed Southfield Pen.

In 1995, the Great House featured in a program shown on Jamaican National Television. In 2018, the village turned into a town and Southfield Town has 4,370 people live in 1,120 Households.

== Amenities ==
Southfield has two hardware stores, one of which is owned and operated by the Parchment family, a Petcom gas station owned by the Gayle family, many churches including Southfield Seventh-Day Adventist church which was the first Seventh Day Adventist Church in the region. It also has many shops, a supermarket and a pharmacy.

There is also a school, Mayfield All Age School, a public library and two churches.

== Notable residents ==
- Dr Robert Trivers, professor of anthropology and biological sciences at Rutgers University.
- Mabel Bent, early 20th century business woman.
