= Saint Elizabeth North Western =

Parliamentary constituency of Jamaica

Saint Elizabeth North East is number 7 on this map.

Saint Elizabeth North Eastern is a parliamentary constituency represented in the Parliament of Jamaica. It elects one Member of Parliament by the first past the post system of election. The constituency covers the north west part of Saint Elizabeth Parish.

== Representation ==
| Election | Member | Party |
|---|---|---|
| 1997 | William J.C. Hutchinson | Jamaica Labour Party |
| 2025 | Andrew Morris | Jamaica Labour Party |
