= Munro College =

Location
- Potsdam, Munro College P.O. St. Elizabeth Jamaica; St Elizabeth; Jamaica; 17.924°N 77.686°W

Information
- Motto: In Arce Sitam Quis Occultabit (A City Set Upon A Hill Cannot Be Hid)
- Founded: 1856
- Sister school: Hampton School (for girls)
- Chairman: Mr. Murphy Greg
- Headmaster: Dr. Mark Smith
- Chaplain: Rev. Olando Gayle
- Gender: Male
- Age: 11 to 19
- Enrollment: 1032
- Average class size: 35 students
- Colour: Navy blue Gold
- Song: Bless O Lord Our Alma Mater
- Website: http://munrocollege.edu.jm/

Munro College is a boarding school for boys in St Elizabeth, Jamaica. It was founded in 1856 as the Potsdam School (named for the city of Potsdam), a school for boys in St Elizabeth as stipulated in the will of plantation owners Robert Hugh Munro and Caleb Dickenson. It was renamed Munro College during World War I as part of the general rejection of German names at the time, though the surrounding Potsdam district was not also renamed.

Munro College takes its name from one of its benefactors and was established in the fashion of the British public school. Several of the boarding houses take the names of other benefactors or illustrious alumni. The campus has its own chapel.

Munro College is reputed to have produced the most Rhodes Scholars of any secondary school in the Caribbean. The most recent Rhodes Scholar from Munro College is Vincent F. Taylor (Jamaica and Magdalen, 2013). Munro College is one of seven all-boys' schools and the only all-boys' boarding school in Jamaica.

Hurricane Beryl severely damaged 32 of the 35 building on the Munro College campus in July 2024. It is estimated that it will take JMD$300 million to repair the devastation.

In November 2025 Hurricane Melissa severely damaged 8 of 35 buildings on the campus. The estimated cost of repair is JMD$90 million. The damage was extensive and resulted in the closure of school for 3 weeks.

== Sixth form ==
Although established as a free school for poor boys, Munro used to admit Hampton girls into its 6th Form programme, but as of the new term of September 2010 this was discontinued, along with the classes previously offered at Hampton School. Munro College now has a shared campus with Hampton School where both set of sixth formers learn the arts.

Hampton School (Jamaica) was founded in 1858 as a sister school to Munro College in the Malvern, Saint Elizabeth (Jamaica). Hampton School is an all-girls boarding school.

== Motto ==
The school's motto is In arce sitam quis occultabit — A city set upon a hill cannot be hid.

== Notable alumni ==
Alumni include many prominent figures in Jamaican society. Politicians include former Prime Minister Sir Donald Sangster; former Ministers of Health Kenneth McNeill, Herbert Eldemire, and Douglas Manley (brother to former Prime Minister Michael Manley); former Minister of Education Burchell Whiteman; former Minister of Communications and Works Kenneth Jones; former Minister of Agriculture, Fisheries and Mining Floyd Green; former Minister of Finance and the Public Service Nigel Clarke. Others include the politician Morris Cargill; Bishop of Jamaica Cyril Swaby; and D. Basil Waite, former Opposition Spokesperson on Education. Other alumni include the footballer and journalist Lindy Delapenha; former Contractor-General and Attorney-General of Jamaica, Derrick McKoy. Judge Ira DeCordova Rowe; the writers Andrew Salkey, Evan Jones and Melvyn Morris; as well as the reggae singer Oje Ken Ollivierre, popularly known as Protoje.

== Historic buildings ==
Four of Munro's buildings have been declared National Heritage Sites by Jamaica National Heritage Trust:

- Coke Farquharson Building
- The Chapel
- Pearman Calder Building
- The Staff Room
- Baby Dorm

Other notable buildings on the campus includes:

- Harrison Memorial Library
- Biology Laboratory
- The Old Observatory
- Hospital Building
- Headmaster's House and Study
- Old Armoury Building
- Mr. Harle's House (now Guidance Counselor Office)
- Bell Tower
- Richard B. Roper Auditorium
- Munro College Post Office

Munro College was the first high school in the English-speaking Caribbean to have a grid-connected wind turbine energy source. The 225 kilowatt generator was commissioned in 1996, making Munro College a pioneer leader in renewable energy sources in the Caribbean. Additionally Munro College host one of thirteen broadband seismograph stations in the Jamaica Seismograph Network (JSN) used for the continuous monitoring of seismic activity.
