= Saint Elizabeth Parish =

Parish of Jamaica

Coordinates: 18°03′N 77°47′W

Saint Elizabeth Sint Elizabet
- Parish
- Saint Elizabeth in Jamaica
- Country: Jamaica
- County: Cornwall
- Capital: Black River
- Other towns: Treasure Beach, Santa Cruz, Malvern, Junction, Balaclava, Prospect, Southfield

Area
  - Total: 1,212.4 km^{2} (468.1 sq mi)
  - Rank: 2

Population (2012)
  - Total: 150,993
  - Density: 124.54/km^{2} (322.56/sq mi)

Saint Elizabeth (Jamaican Patois: Sint Elizabet) is one of Jamaica's largest parishes. It is located in the southwest of the island, in the county of Cornwall. Its capital, Black River, is located at the mouth of the Black River, the widest on the island.

== History ==
Saint Elizabeth originally included most of the southwest part of the island, but Westmoreland was taken from it in 1703, and in 1814 a part of Manchester. The resulting areas were named after the wife of Sir Thomas Modyford, the first English Governor of Jamaica.

There are archeological traces of Taíno/Arawak existence in the parish, as well as of 17th-century colonial Spanish settlements. After 1655, when the English settled on the island, they concentrated on developing large sugar cane plantations with enslaved African workers. Today, buildings with 'Spanish wall' construction (masonry of limestone sand and stone between wooden frames) can still be seen in some areas.

St Elizabeth became a prosperous parish, and Black River an important seaport. In addition to shipping sugar and molasses, Black River became the centre of the logging trade. Large quantities of logwood were exported to Europe to make a blue dye very like Prussian blue, which was popular in the 18th and 19th centuries.

St Elizabeth was the first parish to have electric power, where it was first introduced in a house called Waterloo in Black River in 1893.

In October 2025, St Elizabeth was directly hit by Hurricane Melissa, causing devastation throughout the parish including destroying a majority of the parish capital Black River, with damage dubbed by media as a "disaster of unprecedented catastrophe".

== Geography ==
The parish is located at latitude 18°15'N, and longitude 77°56'W; to the west of Manchester, to the east of Westmoreland, and to the south of St. James and Trelawny. It covers an area of 1,212.4 km^{2}, making it Jamaica's second-largest parish, smaller only than Saint Ann's 1,212.6 km^{2}. The parish is divided into four electoral districts (constituencies), that is North-East, North-West, South-East and South-West.

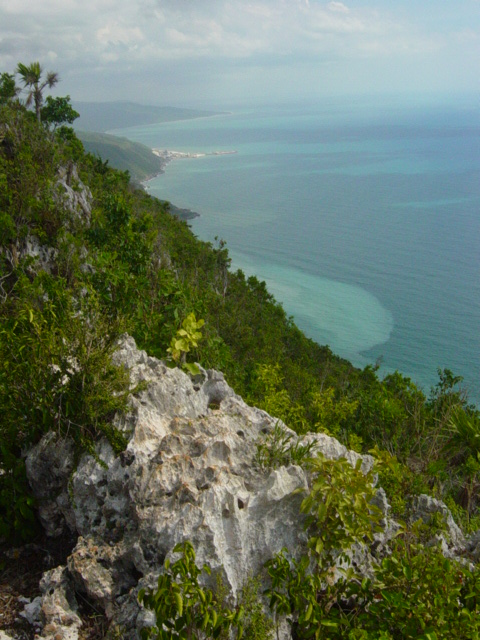
Lovers' Leap, Saint Elizabeth

The northern and northeastern parts of the parish are mountainous. There are three mountain ranges —the Nassau Mountains to the north-east, the Lacovia Mountains to the west of the Nassau Mountains, and the Santa Cruz Mountains which, running south, divide the wide plain to end in a precipitous drop of 1,600 feet (490 m) at Lovers' Leap. The central and southern sections form an extensive plain divided by the Santa Cruz Mountains. A large part of the lowlands is covered by morass, but it still provides grazing land for horses and mules.

The main river in the parish is the Black River, and measuring 53.4 kilometres (33.2 mi), it is one of the longest rivers in Jamaica. It is navigable for about 40 kilometres (25 mi), and is supported by many tributaries including Y.S., Broad, Grass and Horse Savannah. The river has its source in the mountains of Manchester where it rises and flows west as the border between Manchester and Trelawny then goes underground. It reappears briefly in several surrounding towns, but reemerges near Balaclava and tumbles down gorges to the plain known as the Savannah, through the Great Morass and to the sea at Black River, the capital of the parish.

The geology of the parish is primarily alluvial plains to the south, and karstic limestone to the north. The karstic zones are known to contain over 130 caves (Jamaica Cave Register as of 2007 - from Fincham and JCO). These include Mexico Cave and Wallingford River Cave, near Balaclava, which are two associated sections of a major underground river that has its source in south Trelawny, as well as Yardley Chase Caves near the foot of Lovers' Leap, and Peru Cave, near Goshen, which has stalactites and stalagmites. Mineral deposits include bauxite, antimony, white limestone, clay, peat and silica sand, which is used to manufacture glass.

=== Demography ===
The parish had an estimated population of 148,000 in 2001, 4000 of whom live in the capital town. The distinct feature of this parish is that numerous ethnic groups can be found here; St Elizabeth has the greatest ethnic mixture in Jamaica. The Meskito (corrupted to ‘Mosquito’) Indians brought to Jamaica to help capture the Maroons, were allowed to settle in southern St. Elizabeth in return for their assistance and given land grants in this parish. This parish has also attracted Dutch, Spanish, Indian, Maroon, mulatto, English, and other European inhabitants from the 17th century onwards, with the result that many observers feel that it has more people of mixed-race ancestry than can be found in any other part of the island.

In the 19th century Irish, Spanish, Portuguese, Scottish, Germans, Chinese, and East Indians have migrated to Saint Elizabeth. There are pockets of ethnic concentrations in the parish, including Mulatto, Creole, and English notably found in the southeast.

== Politics ==
Saint Elizabeth Parish has four MPs based in four constituencies: Saint Elizabeth North Eastern, Saint Elizabeth North Western, Saint Elizabeth South Eastern and Saint Elizabeth South Western.

== Economy ==
=== Mining ===
The parish has been a major producer of bauxite since the 1960s. Port Kaiser, near a town called Alligator Pond, has a leading deep-water pier for bauxite export. The Alpart alumina refinery was constructed in the 1960s at Nain and produces nearly 2 million tonnes of alumina annually for export. The replacement cost of building the refinery is approximately $2 billion.

There are other alumina refineries close to the nearby town of Mandeville.

=== Agriculture ===
Apart from bauxite mining, the parish also produces a large quantity of Jamaica's sugar; there are two sugar factories in the parish. Fishing is a major industry in the parish, as is tomato canning; a plant is at Bull Savannah. The parish also cultivates crops such as cassava, corn, peas, beans, pimento, ginger, tobacco, tomato, rice sweet potatoes and coffee. As a result of the fertile soil that provide for grazing fields, pastoralism is possible. Livestock include goats, sheep, hogs, and cattle, horses.

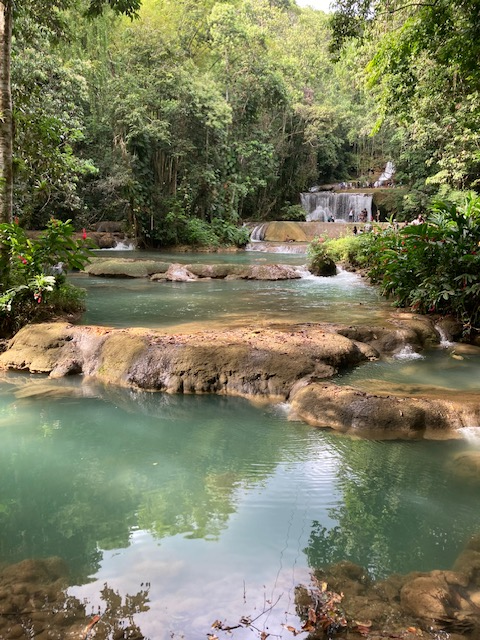
The seven-tiered YS Falls

=== Tourism ===
Since the 1990s, the parish has become a significant tourist destination, with most visitors going to the Treasure Beach area. The Appleton rum distillery, near the rough Cockpit Country in the north of the parish, is also a tourist destination. The Cockpit area was the site of Maroon settlements through much of the 18th century. Ecological tourism along the Black and YS rivers, and in the Great Morass, has been developed in recent years.

== Notable people; Cultural Figures ==
• Keith Lorenzo Blake, aka Prince Alla, internationally renowned conscious roots reggae singer, was born in Saint Elizabeth Parish in 1950.

== Education ==
The parish has 12 high schools and 75 primary level institutions as well as 167 early childhood institutions. Notable institutions include:

- Bethlehem Moravian College
- Black River High School
- Hampton School
- Lacovia High School
- Munro College
- St. Elizabeth Technical High School

== Places ==
=== Beaches ===
- Font Hill Beach
- Galleon, Crane
- Fullerswood
- Parottee
- Fort Charles
- Calabash Bay
- Great Bay
- Billy's Bay
- Frenchman's Bay
- Treasure Beach
- Blue Fields Beach

=== Towns and villages ===
The Social Development Commission's national grid of communities has sixty one communities in St. Elizabeth broken down into 465 districts. The communities which include major towns are [11:00am - 11:59pm | May 1-31, 2009 01:00:00am - 23:59:59pm].

- Aberdeen
- Accompong
- Balaclava
- Ballards Valley
- Barbary Hall
- Bigwoods
- Black River
- Braes River
- Brinkley
- Bogue
- Brompton
- Bull Savanna
- Burnt Savannah
- Carlisle
- Carisbrook
- Chivot Hill
- Cotterwood
- Crawford
- Elderslie
- Exton
- Fairfield
- Fullerswood
- Goshen
- Giddy Hall
- Ginger Hill
- Hodges
- Holland
- Hopewell
- Junction
- Lacovia
- Leeds
- Lititz
- Maggotty
- Malvern
- Merrywood
- Morningside
- Mountainside
- Middle Quarters
- Mulgrave
- Nain
- Newell
- Newton
- Parrottee
- Pepper
- Pedro Plains
- Pisgah
- Pondside
- Portsea
- Potsdam
- Quickstep
- Red Bank
- Rose Hall
- Roses Valley
- Rose Hall
- Russells
- Retirement
- Santa Cruz
- Southfield
- Siloah
- Springfield
- Top Hill
- Thornton
- Treasure Beach
- Watchwell
- Williamsfield
- Warminster
- White Hill
- Woodlands

Flagaman

=== Caves ===
St. Elizabeth has approximately 44 caves, including:

- Mexico
- Peru Cave
- Yhardly Chase Caves
- Wallingford Caves
- Nain

=== Other places of interest ===
- Lover's Leap is a cliff plunging several hundred metres into the sea, with an attached romantic legend of two young slaves jumping to their death rather than live apart. There is a lighthouse here too.
- Y.S. Falls is a well-known falls in Jamaica, similar to Dunn's River Falls in Ocho Rios, St. Ann.
- Bamboo Avenue in Holland Bamboo was developed in the 17th century when local landowners planted bamboo on both sides of the road to provide shade during their travels.
- Black River is one of the island's largest wetland freshwater ecosystems. Parts of the river can be explored by guided boat trip, where one can experience mangroves, and observe a host of wildlife, including salt water crocodiles, herons, and egrets.

== See also ==
- History of Jamaica
