= Black River, Jamaica =

Black River Blak Riva
- Parish Capital
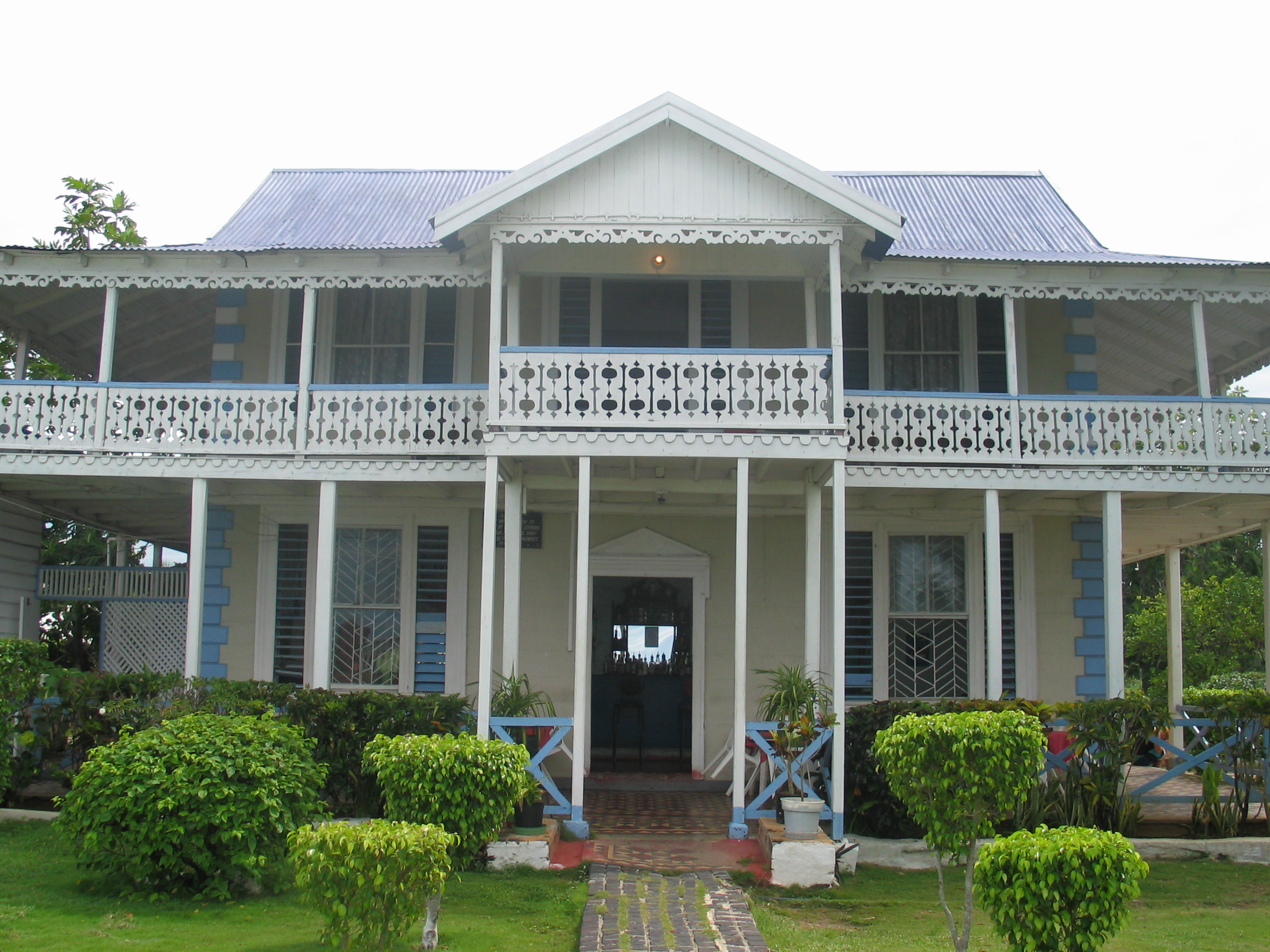
- Waterloo Guest House prior to Hurricane Melissa

- Location within Jamaica
- Coordinates: 18.0256°N 77.851°W
- Country: Jamaica
- Parish: St Elizabeth

Population
  - Estimate (2009): 4,261
- Time zone: UTC-5 (EST)

Black River is a coastal town in southwestern Jamaica. It is the parish capital of St Elizabeth and developed as a port around the mouth of the river of the same name. Today, the town is a centre of environmental tourism and a gateway to the Treasure Beach resort area. Treasure Beach and Crane Beach are to the south-east, with Luana Beach to the west.

Growing prosperity in the sugar and lumber trade led to the construction of several warehouses. Some have been adapted as restaurants or as bases for eco-tours of the river.

On 28 October 2025, widespread devastation was caused by Hurricane Melissa, with several public and historical buildings suffering significant structural damage. It was estimated that nearly 90% of the town's homes lost their roofs, with damage dubbed by media as a "disaster of unprecedented catastrophe".

== History ==
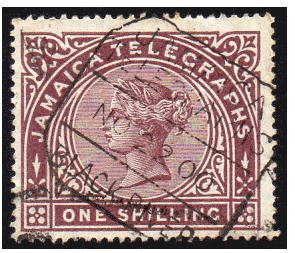
Jamaican telegraph stamp used at Black River in 1900.

Black River is one of the oldest European towns in the island of Jamaica, being shown on John Sellers' 1685 map.

Writing in the 1770s, Edward Long described Black River as a "village" and the "chief barquadier for all the plantations and settlements in the parish". The harbour was defended by two fortresses: a publicly-maintained battery of five guns and a private property belonging to a Mr Crutcher. A quarter mile from Black River there was a barracks capable of holding 30 soldiers as well as a church. In 1790, William Beckford described Black River as having 50 houses, "and a fine bay for shipping."

It was designed by the Leyden brothers of England, three wealthy men who were substantial land proprietors in the area. In 1773, Black River replaced Lacovia, 19 miles to the north-east, as the capital of St. Elizabeth. Soon after it became the main commercial, economic and transshipment centre of the parish. By the early 1900s, it was second only to Kingston in economic importance on the island.

In the 18th and 19th centuries, Black River was a busy seaport for the lucrative logwood trade and for exports of rum, pimento and cattle skins from the nearby Holland, Vineyard, and Fullerswood plantations. Into the early 19th century, slaves from Africa and other Caribbean islands were landed here and sold at auction at Farquharson Wharf (originally Town Wharf). This wharf still stands.

A monument was installed at Black River in 2007 to memorialize the slaves killed in the Zong massacre of 1781. More than 132 slaves were thrown overboard at sea from the Zong. They were sacrificed by the crew purportedly to save the remainder and the crew because of a shortage of water on board. Zong finally landed at Black River. Its owners later sued for insurance claims for the slaves who had been killed, and the case was litigated in 1783 in London. The court rejected the owners' claim, as it was shown that the crew had made navigation errors that kept the ship at sea and threatened its supplies. Abolitionists publicized it, and the case became a catalyst for the burgeoning British abolitionist movement.

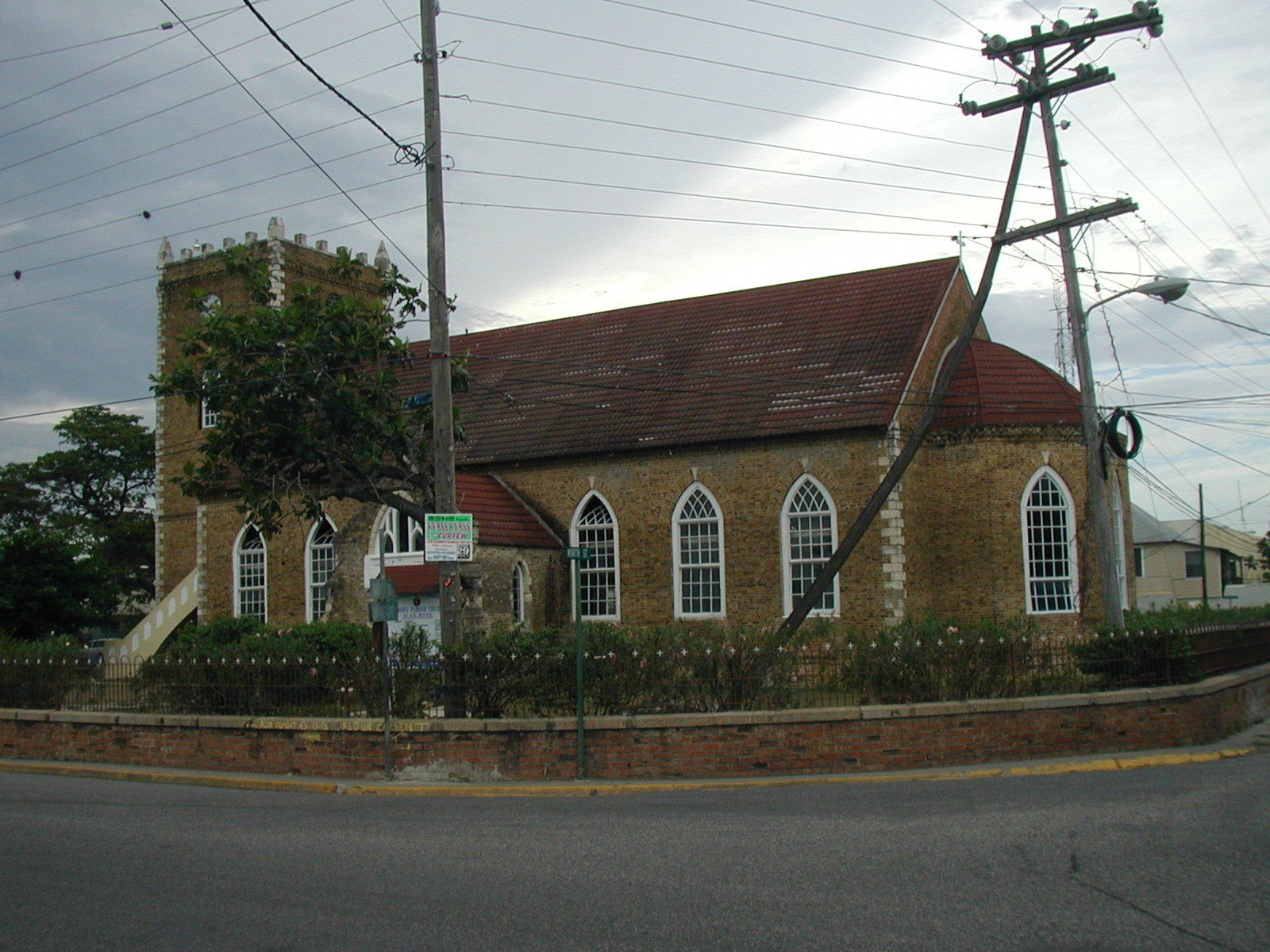
St. John's Anglican Church before Hurricane Melissa.

As a major sea port, Black River became a commercial center on the south coast of Jamaica. Due to its wealth, in 1893 this was the first town in Jamaica to be lit by electricity. Ten years later, in 1903, it was the first town on the island to have automobiles. A telephone system was installed 10 years after the instrument was invented.

On 28 October 2025, Black River was directly hit by Category 5 Hurricane Melissa. The hurricane destroyed the majority of structures in the town including the hospital, Waterloo Guest House, courthouse, library, police station, and the 300-year old St John's Anglican church.
