= Lucea =

Lucea may refer to:

- Lucea, Jamaica, a coastal town
- Lucea East River, a river in Jamaica
- Lucea West River, a river in Jamaica
- Santa Lucea, a town of the Ais tribe, now St. Lucie Inlet, Florida, U.S.
