= Flint River (disambiguation) =

Flint River may refer to:

== Jamaica ==
- Flint River (Hanover, Jamaica)
- Flint River (St. Mary, Jamaica)

== United States ==
- Flint River (Alabama)
- Flint River (Georgia)
- Flint River (Iowa)
- Flint River (Michigan)
