= White House, Jamaica =

Settlement in Westmoreland Parish, Jamaica

Coordinates: 18°05′43″N 77°58′11″W

Location of White House in Jamaica

White House is a settlement in Westmoreland Parish, Jamaica, with some 4,000 residents, known traditionally for its fishing industry, which provides fresh seafood to businesses across Jamaica.

== Tourism ==
After recent investment to promote tourism, the area is now visited by many Jamaican and foreign tourists. Attractions include a village tour and excursions east of the town to, for example, Whitehouse Beach, Font Hill Wildlife Sanctuary, safaris on the Black River and Y.S. Falls.
