= List of rivers of Jamaica =

This is a list of rivers of Jamaica, arranged from west to east, with respective tributaries indented under each larger stream's name.

== North Coast ==
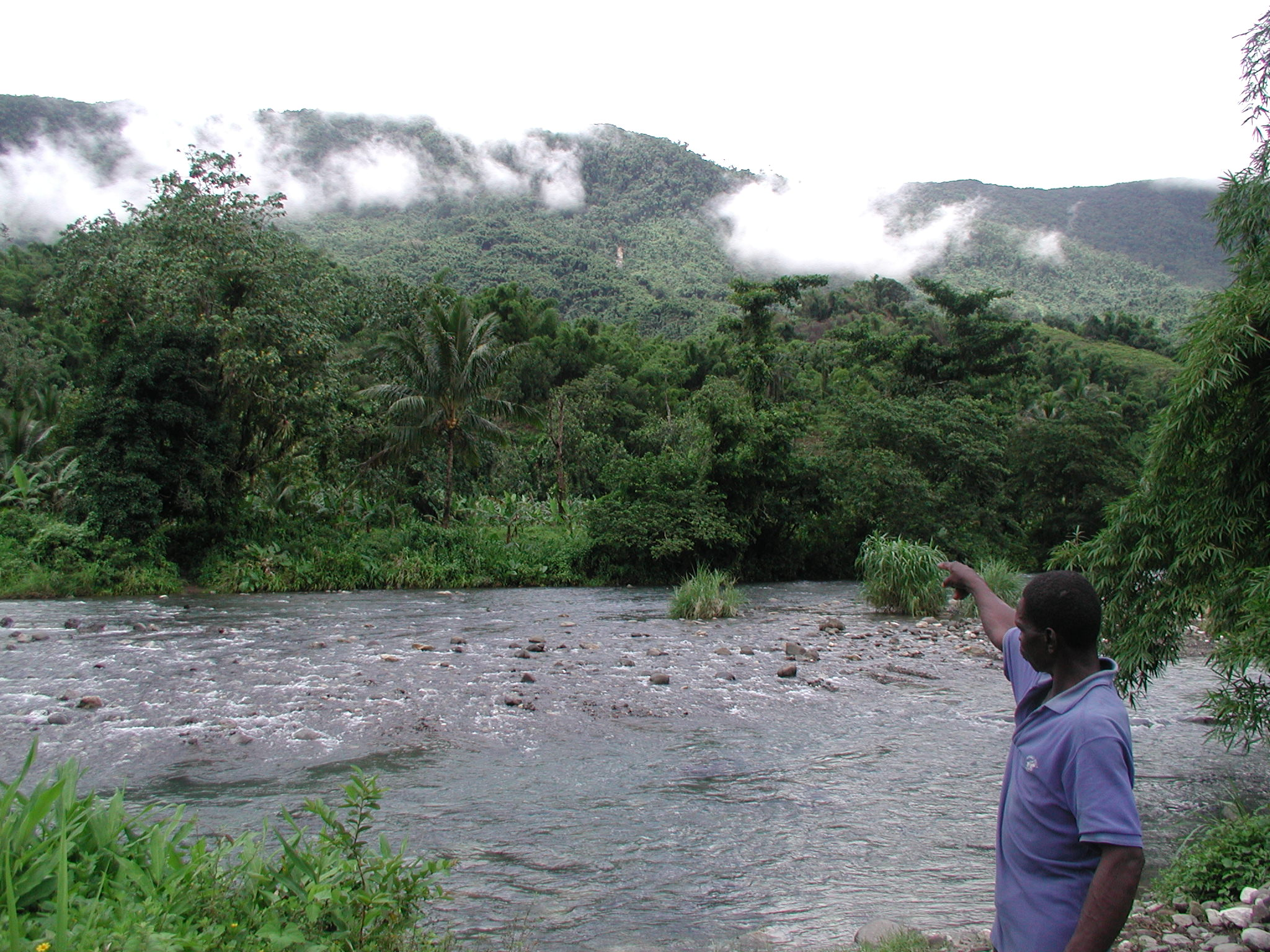
Banana fields on the bank of the Rio Grande River.

- South Negril River
  - Unnamed
- Middle River
  - Unnamed
  - Unnamed
- North Negril River
- Orange River
  - Unnamed
  - New Found River
  - Cave River
    - Fish River
- Green Island River
- Lucea West River
- Lucea East River
- Flint River
- Great River
- Montego River
- Martha Brae River
- Rio Bueno
  - Cave River (underground connection)
- Roaring River
- Llandovery River
- Dunn River
- White River
- Rio Nuevo
- Oracabessa River
- Port Maria River
- Pagee
- Wag Water River (Agua Alta)
  - Flint River
- Annotto River
- Dry River
- Buff Bay River
- Spanish River
- Swift River
- Rio Grande
  - Black River
  - Stony River
  - Guava River
- Plantain Garden River

== South Coast ==
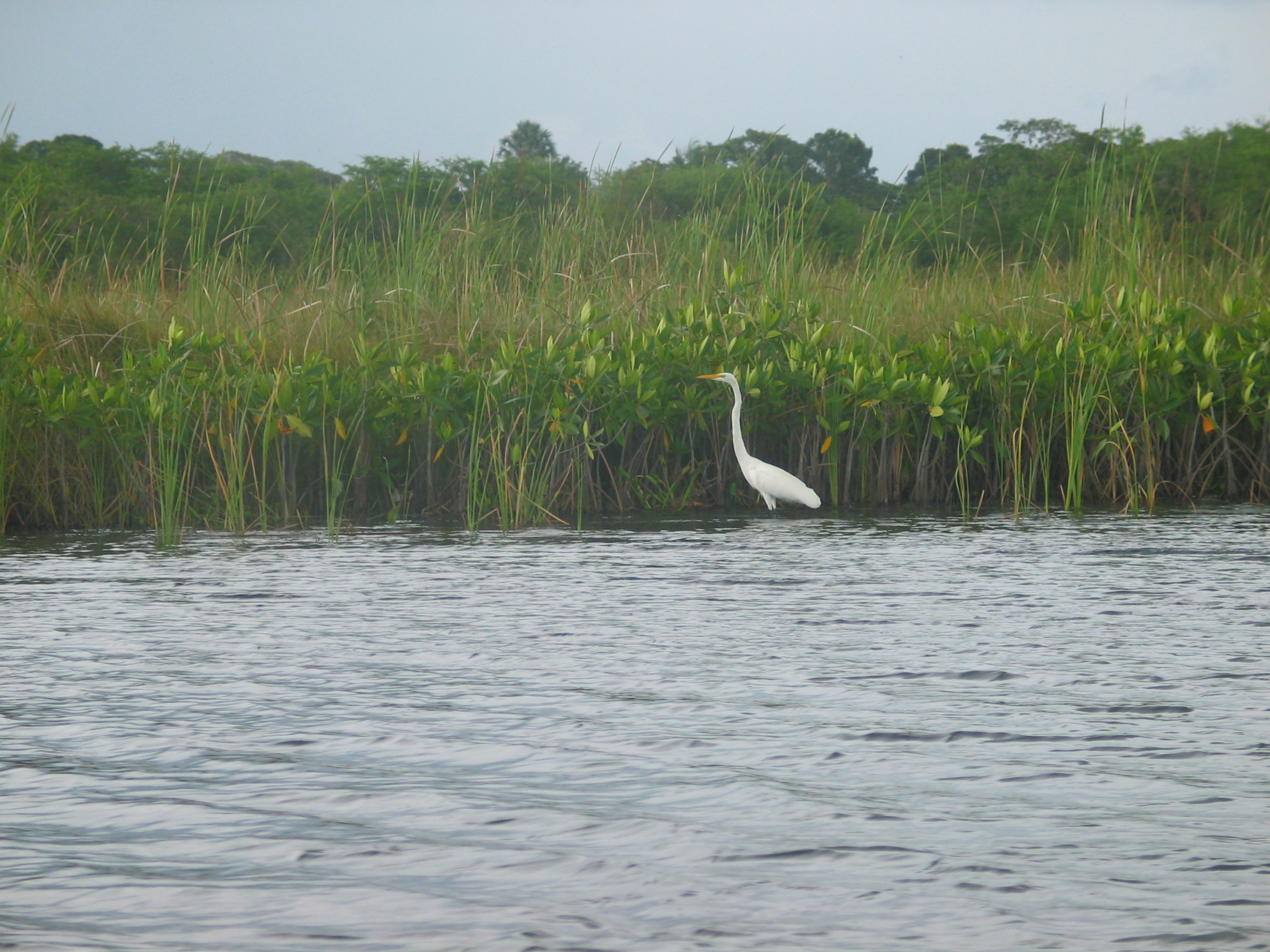
The Black River.

- New Savannah River
- Cabarita River
  - Thicket River
  - Morgans River
- Sweet River
- Black River
  - Broad River
  - Y.S. River
  - Smith River
  - One Eye River (underground connection)
    - Hectors River (underground connection)
- Alligator Hole River
- Gut River
- Milk River
- Rio Minho
- Salt River
- Coleburns Gully
- Rio Cobre
  - Rio Pedro
  - Rio Doro
  - Rio Magno
- Ferry River
- Hope River
- Cane River
- Yallahs River
- Morant River
  - Negro River

== See also ==
- Water resources management in Jamaica
