= List of shipwrecks in February 1890 =

The list of shipwrecks in February 1890 includes ships sunk, foundered, grounded, or otherwise lost during February 1890.

== 1 February ==
List of shipwrecks: 1 February 1890
| Ship | State | Description |
|---|---|---|
| Heather Bell | United Kingdom | The schooner struck the pier at Cardiff, Glamorgan, driving her anchor through her bows. |
| Orient, and Portia | United Kingdom | The fishing ketches collided in the North Sea. Both vessels foundered. Their crews were rescued by the steamship Onward (United Kingdom). |

== 2 February ==
List of shipwrecks: 2 February 1890
| Ship | State | Description |
|---|---|---|
| Caloric | United Kingdom | The steamship was driven ashore at Bilbao, Spain. She was refloated and put back to Bilbao. |
| Exe | United Kingdom | The steamship ran aground in the Elbe at Brockdorf, Germany. She was refloated but the ran aground at Schulau. She was refloated the next day and taken in to Hamburg. |
| Inchlonga | United Kingdom | The steamship was driven ashore in the Hooghly River at the Muckaraputy Lumps. She was refloated and found to be severely damaged. |

== 3 February ==
List of shipwrecks: 3 February 1890
| Ship | State | Description |
|---|---|---|
| Alexandria | Bulgaria | The lighter was driven ashore by ice at Roustchouk. |
| Cambrian Princess | United Kingdom | The ship was driven ashore at Wallaroo, South Australia. She was refloated and taken in to Wallaroo. |
| Enterprise | United Kingdom | The steamship arrived at Havre de Grâce, Seine-Inférieure on fire. |
| Godolphin | United Kingdom | The steamship caught fire at Liverpool, Lancashire. She was on a voyage from Galveston, Texas, United States to Liverpool. |
| Preston | United Kingdom | The ship ran aground on the Haisborough Sands, in the North Sea off the coast of Norfolk. She was on a voyage from London to Blyth, Northumberland. She was refloated and taken in to Lowestoft, Suffolk. |

== 4 February ==
List of shipwrecks: 4 February 1890
| Ship | State | Description |
|---|---|---|
| British Prince | United Kingdom | The steamship ran aground off the Delaware Breakwater. She was on a voyage from London to an American port. She was refloated. |
| Devonshire | United Kingdom | The steamship collided with the steamship Blackboy (United Kingdom) in the River Thames and was damaged. Devonshire put in to Gravesend, Kent. |
| Lord Alfred Paget | United Kingdom | The steamship collided with the steamship Abana (United Kingdom) in the River Thames and was damaged. She put back to London. |
| Mazeppa | United Kingdom | The steamship was driven ashore at Breaksea Point, Glamorgan. She was on a voyage from London to Barry, Glamorgan. She was refloated the next day and taken in to Cardiff, Glamorgan. |
| Slieve Donard | United Kingdom | The sloop was wrecked at Drimanco Point, County Donegal. |

== 5 February ==
List of shipwrecks: 5 February 1890
| Ship | State | Description |
|---|---|---|
| Eurydice | United Kingdom | The ship sprang a leak and sank in shallow water 10 nautical miles (19 km) off Pensacola, Florida, United States. She was on a voyage from Quebec, Dominion of Canada to Buenos Aires, Argentina. |
| Liscard | United Kingdom | The steamship ran into the training ship Warspite (United Kingdom) in the River Thames at Charlton, London and was damaged. She was on a voyage from London to Bombay, India. She put in to Tilbury, Essex for repairs. |
| Ravas | Spain | The steamship ran aground at Bilbao. |
| Roseville | United Kingdom | The steamship ran aground in the River Tweed. She was on a voyage from Coosaw Island, South Carolina, United States to Berwick upon Tweed, Northumberland. She was refloated on 8 February. |
| Sommerfield | United Kingdom | The steamship ran aground at Ismailia, Egypt. She was later refloated. |

== 6 February ==
List of shipwrecks: 6 February 1890
| Ship | State | Description |
|---|---|---|
| Addie | United States | The steamship foundered off Jefferson Point, Washington. Her crew were rescued by the steamship Virginia (United States). |
| Bengar | United Kingdom | The steamship was driven ashore at "Dingle Point". Also reported as ashore near Liverpool, Lancashire. She was refloated the next day with the assistance of four tugs and taken in to Liverpool. |
| Eddystone | United Kingdom | The tug was driven ashore 1 nautical mile (1.9 km) north of Blyth, Northumberland. |
| Emme | (British Cape Colony) Cape Colony | The schooner was wrecked in Delgoa Bay. All on board survived. |
| Voorwarts | Netherlands | The steamship ran aground at IJmuiden, North Holland. She was on a voyage from Le Havre, Seine-Inférieure, France to Amsterdam, North Holland. |
| Unnamed | France | The schooner ran aground in the Adour. |

== 7 February ==
List of shipwrecks: 7 February 1890
| Ship | State | Description |
|---|---|---|
| Brettesnaes | Norway | The steamship was driven ashore at "Bronosund". |
| Dungonnil | United Kingdom | The steamship ran aground on the Black Rocks, south of Troon, Ayrshire. She was on a voyage from Belfast, County Antrim to Ardrossan, Ayrshire. |
| Elmville | United Kingdom | The steamship ran aground on the Wolf Trap Ledge, in Chesapeake Bay. She was on a voyage from Baltimore, Maryland, United States to Bristol, Gloucestershire. She was refloated and resumed her voyage. |
| Gezina | Germany | The ship departed from Cuxhaven for Leith, Lothian, United Kingdom. No further trace, reported overdue. |
| Mocking Bird | United Kingdom | The schooner was driven ashore and wrecked at Milleur Point, Wigtownshire. Her crew were rescued. She was on a voyage from Troon, Ayrshire to Londonderry. |
| Niord | Norway | The steamship ran aground in Norwegian waters. She was refloated. |
| Onni | Russia | The barque was driven ashore and wrecked at Cape Town, Cape Colony. |
| Robilant | Italy | The steamship was wrecked in Saldanha Bay, Cape Colony. Her crew were rescued. She was on a voyage from New York, United States to a Chinese port. |

== 8 February ==
List of shipwrecks: 8 February 1890
| Ship | State | Description |
|---|---|---|
| Arctic | Norway | The barque ran aground at Savannah, Georgia, United States. She was on a voyage from Savannah to Stettin, Germany. |
| Endeavour | United Kingdom | The ketch was wrecked on the Longsand, in the North Sea off the coast of Essex. Her crew were rescued by the steamship Talley Abbey (United Kingdom). Endeavour was on a voyage from Dunkerque, Nord, France to London. |
| Gleaner | United Kingdom | The fishing boat was run down and sunk in the Firth of Forth by the steamship Zamora (United Kingdom) with the loss of two of her seven crew. Survivors were rescued by Zamora. |
| Spyridion Vagliano | Greece | The steamship struck The Manacles, off the Lizard, Cornwall, United Kingdom and sank almost immediately with the loss of her captain. Eight of her crew landed on nearby Godrevy beach in a boat. Thirteen crew in a second boat were reported missing. She was on a voyage from Novorossiysk, Russia to Falmouth, Cornwall. |
| Virginia | United States | The steamship sank off the coast of Washington. |
| Six unnamed vessels | United States | The fishing vessels were wrecked in Chesapeake Bay with the loss of twenty lives. |

== 9 February ==
List of shipwrecks: 9 February 1890
| Ship | State | Description |
|---|---|---|
| Furnessia | United Kingdom | The steamship ran aground in the Clyde. She was on a voyage from the Clyde to New York, United States. She was refloated. |
| Latona | United Kingdom | The steamship ran aground in the Clyde She was refloated the next day. |
| Louise | United Kingdom | The steamship was driven ashore at "Brono", Norway. |
| Magpie | Romania | The tug was holed by ice and sank at Galaţi. |
| Marino a Vagliano | Greece | The steamship sprang a leak and was beached at Cape Sicié, Var, France. She was on a voyage from Cette, Hérault, France to Livorno, Italy. |
| Star of England | United Kingdom | The steamship ran aground on The Shingles, in the English Channel off the Isle of Wight. She was on a voyage from a port in New Zealand to London. She was refloated and resumed her voyage. |
| Unnamed | United Kingdom | The fishing boat was run down and sunk in the Firth of Forth by the steamship Savona (United Kingdom) with the loss of two of her seven crew. |

== 10 February ==
List of shipwrecks: 10 February 1890
| Ship | State | Description |
|---|---|---|
| Bonnie Lass | United Kingdom | The schooner was driven ashore at Cromarty. She was on a voyage from Sunderland, County Durham to Cromarty. She was refloated. |
| California | Germany | The steamship was driven ashore at the mouth of the Patapsco River. She was on a voyage from Baltimore, Maryland, United States to Hamburg. She was refloated and resumed her voyage. |
| Eads | United States | The steamship sank in the Mississippi River 2 nautical miles (3.7 km) downstream of Memphis, Tennessee with the loss of six lives. |
| Foxhound | United Kingdom | The barque was damaged by fire at Swansea, Glamorgan. |
| Harriet | United Kingdom | The steamship ran aground at Llanelly, Glamorgan. She was on a voyage from Middlesbrough, Yorkshire to Llanelly. She was refloated. |
| Port Eads | United States | The steamship struck Bridge Pier No. 2 and sank in 70 feet (21 m) of water at Memphis, Tennessee. Seven crewmen died. Survivors were rescued by C. B. Bryan, Welcome, and May Flower (all United States), plus skiffs from shore. |
| Quito | United Kingdom | The steamship was driven ashore on Anholt, Denmark. She was later refloated and taken in to Copenhagen, Denmark. |
| Sperber | Germany | The steamship ran aground in the Elbe. She was on a voyage from London, United Kingdom to Bremen. She was refloated and taken in to Bremerhaven. |
| Unnamed | (United Kingdom of Great Britain and Ireland) Gibraltar | The hulk was run into by the steamship Wansbeck (United Kingdom) and damaged at Gibraltar. |

== 11 February ==
List of shipwrecks: 11 February 1890
| Ship | State | Description |
|---|---|---|
| Argyle | United Kingdom | The steamship ran aground in the River Thames at East Greenwich, London. |
| Avena | Sweden | The steamship ran aground in the River Thames at Greenwich, London. |
| Salanque | France | The schooner was driven ashore at Cap Leucate, Aude. Her crew were rescued. |
| Thy | Denmark | The steamship was driven ashore at "Venoodle". |
| Wachusett | United States | The fishing schooner was wrecked in Fell's Cove near Burin, Newfoundland Colony. Her crew were rescued after spending two days in a hut on the island. She was later refloated and taken into Yarmouth, Nova Scotia in a severely damaged condition. |
| Wansfell | United Kingdom | The steamship ran aground in the River Thames at Greenhithe, Kent. She was refloated and resumed her voyage. |

== 12 February ==
List of shipwrecks: 12 February 1890
| Ship | State | Description |
|---|---|---|
| Agilis, and Emily | (United Kingdom of Great Britain and Ireland) Jersey; United Kingdom | The brig Agilis and the steamship Emily collided at South Shields, County Durham and were both severely damaged. |
| Ajax | Denmark | The steamship was driven ashore by ice at Peyse, Germany. She was on a voyage from Königsberg, Germany to Copenhagen. She was refloated the next day and taken in to Pillau, Germany. |
| Carron Park, and Pelican | United Kingdom | The steamships collided in the River Thames at Erith, Kent and were both severely damaged. Pelican was beached. |
| Deeside | United Kingdom | The steamship collided with the steamship Ludgate Hill (United Kingdom) and sank off Prawle Point, Devon with the loss of seven of her thirteen crew. Survivors were rescued by Ludgate Hill. Deeside was on a voyage from Le Havre, Seine-Inférieure, France to Briton Ferry, Glamorgan. |
| Falke | Germany | The steamship ran aground in the Weser. She was on a voyage from London, United Kingdom to Bremen. |
| Garfield | United States | The tug collided with the steamship Dunholme (United Kingdom) at New York and became waterlogged. |
| Holyhead | United Kingdom | The barque ran aground on the Lonsdale Reef. She was on a voyage from Liverpool, Lancashire to Melbourne, Victoria. |
| Möwe | Germany | The steamship ran agroud in the Weser. She was on a voyage from Grangemouth, Stirlingshire, United Kingdom to Bremen. |
| Sent | Italy | The steamship was wrecked at Cette, Hérault, France. Her crew were rescued. She was on a voyage from Liverpool to Livorno. |

== 13 February ==
List of shipwrecks: 13 February 1890
| Ship | State | Description |
|---|---|---|
| Bivouac | United Kingdom | The steamship ran aground at Avonmouth, Somerset. She was refloated. |
| HMS Conquest | Royal Navy | The Comus-class corvette ran ashore on Pemba Island. She was refloated and taken in to Zanzibar. |
| Constance | United Kingdom | The steamship collided with the steamship Redewater (United Kingdom) in the River Tyne and was beached. She was on a voyage from South Shields, County Durham to Pillau, Germany. She was refloated on 8 March. |
| Ebenezer | United Kingdom | The barque was run into by the steamship Hermod (Sweden) and sank in the River Mersey. Her crew were rescued by Hermod. Ebenezer was on a voyage from Liverpool, Lancashire to Buenos Aires, Argentina. |
| Iona | United Kingdom | The steamship caught fire at Bristol, Gloucestershire. |
| Sophie Rickmers | Germany | The ship ran aground at in the Suez Canal at Gebel Mariam, Egypt. She was on a voyage from Barry, Glamorgan, United Kingdom to Singapore. She was refloated and taken in to Suez, Egypt. |
| 36 | Germany | The lighter ran aground at the mouth of the Geeste and was beached. |

== 14 February ==
List of shipwrecks: 14 February 1890
| Ship | State | Description |
|---|---|---|
| Ailsa Craig | United Kingdom | The steamship was driven ashore at Isola Point, Malta. She was on a voyage from Cardiff, Glamorgan to Bombay, India. She was refloated the next day. |
| Dido | Austria-Hungary | The steamship ran aground at Malamocco, Italy. She was refloated the next day. |
| Endeavour | United Kingdom | The ship was driven ashore at Clacton-on-Sea, Essex. |
| Grampus | United Kingdom | The steam trawler foundered in a storm some 230 miles off the coast of Aberdeenshire. Lost with all hands. |
| Lizzie | United Kingdom | The ketch was wrecked on the Middleton Sands, in the North Sea off the coast of County Durham. Her eight crew were rescued by the Hartlepool Lifeboat. She was on a voyage from Great Yarmouth, Norfolk to Sunderland, County Durham. |
| Penguin | United Kingdom | The steamship caught fire in the North Sea and was abandoned off Ameland, Friesland, Netherlands. All on board were rescued. She was on a voyage from Harwich, Essex to Hamburg, Germany. |
| Smelt | United Kingdom | The smack was driven ashore at Spurn Point, Yorkshire. Her six crew were rescued by the Spurn Lifeboat. She subsequently became a wreck. |
| Union | France | The brig collided with the steamship Thomas Anderson (United Kingdom) and sank in the Atlantic Ocean with the loss of four of her crew. Survivors were rescued by Thomas Anderson. |

== 15 February ==
List of shipwrecks: 15 February 1890
| Ship | State | Description |
|---|---|---|
| Adela | United Kingdom | The brig ran aground on Jenkin Sand, in the North Sea off the coast of Essex. She was refloated on 17 February and towed in to the River Thames. |
| Diana | Denmark | The ship was driven ashore at "Grenan". Seventeen people were rescued. She was on a voyage from Gothenburg, Sweden to Kiel, Germany or vice versa. |
| Emilie L. Boyd, and Rolf | United Kingdom; Norway | The barque Emilie L. Boyd and the full-rigged ship Rolf collided off the Canary Islands. Emily L. Boyd sank. All sixteen people on board were rescued by Rolf. Emilie L. Boyd was on a voyage from New York, United States to Hong Kong. Rolf was severely damaged. She was on a voyage from Le Havre, Seine-Inférieure, France to New York. |
| Fleur de Marie | France | The ship foundered off Pointe Saint-Mathieu, Finistère. Her crew were rescued. She was on a voyage from Cardiff, Glamorgan, United Kingdom to Vannes, Morbihan. |
| Galicia | United Kingdom | The steamship ran aground in the Elbe at Finkenwerder, Germany. She was on a voyage from Baltimore, Maryland, United States to Hamburg, Germany. She was refloated on 17 February. |
| Gladiator | United Kingdom | The fishing smack collided with the fishing smack Secret (United Kingdom) and sank in the North Sea with the loss of four of her five crew. The survivor was rescued by Secret. |
| Grenmar | Norway | The steamship ran aground in the Clyde at Dumbarton, United Kingdom. She was on a voyage from Glasgow, Renfrewshire to Barrow-in-Furness, Lancashire, United Kingdom. She was refloated on 17 February. |
| Imogene | United Kingdom | The fishing trawler was driven ashore at Blakeney, Norfolk. Her crew were rescued. |
| Pansy | United Kingdom | The steamship ran aground at Lowestoft, Suffolk. She was on a voyage from Newcastle upon Tyne, Northumberland to Huelva, Spain. |
| Simon Dumois | Norway | The steamship was driven into the breakwater at Granton, Lothian, United Kingdom. She was being towed from Leith, Lothian to Grangemouth, Stirlingshire, United Kingdom by the tug Blucher (United Kingdom). She was refloated on 17 February and beached. |

== 16 February ==
List of shipwrecks: 16 February 1890
| Ship | State | Description |
|---|---|---|
| Alexander Pirie | United Kingdom | The steamship ran aground on the Cutler Sand, in the North Sea off the coast of Essex. She was on a voyage from Lowestoft to Ipswich, Suffolk. She was refloated with assistance and resumed her voyage the next day. |
| Cambrian | United Kingdom | The steamship was run into by the steamship Ruby (United Kingdom) off Llanelly, Glamorgan and was holed. Cambrian was on a voyage from Barrow-in-Furness, Lancashire to Llanelly. She was declared a total loss. |
| Correspondent, Hermann, and Prima | German Empire | The lighters were run into by the steamship Russia (Flag unknown) at Cuxhaven and were damage. Correspondent was beached. |
| Louise | United States | The steamship struck a submerged object in the St. Johns River. |
| Nautique | France | The steamship, bound from Le Havre, Seine-Inférieure, for Baltimore, Maryland, United States, foundered in mid-Atlantic Ocean shortly after the crew were rescued by the steamship Manitoban (United Kingdom). |
| Venus | United Kingdom | The steamship struck a sunken wreck at Buenos Aires, Argentina and sprang a leak. She was placed under repair. |
| Unnamed | Flag unknown | The barque drifted on to the Goodwin Sands, Kent. United Kingdom in a capsized condition. A nameboard from Louise et Marie (Flag unknown) came ashore at Kingsgate, Kent on 18 February. |

== 17 February ==
List of shipwrecks: 17 February 1890
| Ship | State | Description |
|---|---|---|
| Arethusa | United Kingdom | The ship ran aground at Spike Island, County Cork. She was on her maiden voyage, from Liverpool, Lancashire to Calcutta, India. She was refloated with assistance from two tugs and taken in to Queenstown, County Cork, where she collided with the steamship Persian Monarch (United Kingdom). |
| Borussia | Germany | The steamship ran aground in the Elbe at Finkenwerder. She was on a voyage from Saint Thomas, Virgin Islands to Hamburg. |
| Haverton | United Kingdom | The steamship ran aground in the Gulf of Suez. She was on a voyage from Newport, Monmouthshire to Calcutta. She was refloated and taken in to Aden for examination. |
| Jersey City | United States | The steamship ran aground at New York. She was refloated with the assistance of two tugs. |
| Moravia | Germany | The steamship ran aground in the Elbe at Finkenwerder. |
| Regulus | United Kingdom | The steamship ran aground at Sunderland, County Durham. She was refloated and resumed her voyage. |
| State of Georgia | United Kingdom | The steamship suffered a broken propeller shaft and came ashore on Sanda Island, Argyllshire. She was refloated with assistance from the steamships Gardenia and Inistrahull (both United Kingdom) and towed in to the Clyde. |

== 18 February ==
List of shipwrecks: 18 February 1890
| Ship | State | Description |
|---|---|---|
| Anna | Denmark | The schooner was driven ashore at Runton, Norfolk, United Kingdom. She was on a voyage from a Swedish port to Rochester, Kent and/or London, United Kingdom. |
| Caerloch | United Kingdom | The steamship was driven ashore on Tenedos, Ottoman Empire. She was refloated. |
| Coral Queen | United Kingdom | The steamship collided with the steamship Brinio (Netherlands) and sank in the North Sea 7 nautical miles (13 km) off Hartlepool, County Durham. Seven of her eighteen crew were reported missing, feared drowned. The rest took to a boat; they were rescued by the tug Earl Dumfries (United Kingdom). Two of her crew were rescued by Brinio. |
| Dithmarschen | Germany | The ship ran aground in the Eider. She was on a voyage from Middlesbrough, Yorkshire, United Kingdom to Fredrikstad, Norway. |
| Ethels | United Kingdom | The ship ran aground on the Haisborough Sands, in the North Sea off the coast of Norfolk. She was on a voyage from Newcastle upon Tyne, Northumberland to Rio de Janeiro, Brazil. She was refloated and put in to Grimsby, Lincolnshire in a leaky condition. |
| Faure | British Cape Colony | The lighter was lost off Port Natal. |
| Maroochila | Italy | The barque was driven ashore near Saint-Cyprien, Pyrénées-Orientales, France. She was on a voyage from Barcelona, Spain to Genoa. |
| Pearl | United Kingdom | The barque was driven ashore at Tilburyness, Essex. |
| Tom Roper | United Kingdom | The schooner ran aground on the Tongue Sand, in the North Sea off the coast of Essex. She was refloated and towed to Coalhouse Point, Essex in a leaky condition and was beached there. |

== 19 February ==
List of shipwrecks: 19 February 1890
| Ship | State | Description |
|---|---|---|
| Albany | United Kingdom | The steamship ran aground in the Meuse. She was on a voyage from Baltimore, Maryland, United States to Rotterdam, South Holland, Netherlands. She was refloated. |
| Alice Depeaux | United Kingdom | The steamship ran aground at Sunderland, County Durham, United Kingdom and was damaged. |
| Cairngorm | United Kingdom | The steamship collided with the steamship Oruba (Flag unknown) in the River Mersey and was severely damaged. Cairngorm was on a voyage from Carthagena, Spain to Liverpool, Lancashire. |
| Castelhuno | Spain | The steamship caught fire at New Orleans, Louisiana, United States. The fire was extinguished. |
| Elizabeth | United Kingdom | The schooner foundered 12 nautical miles (22 km) north west of Teelin Head, County Donegal. Her four crew took to a boat' they were rescued the next day by HMS Victoria (Royal Navy). |
| Genevieve | France | The pilot boat was lost at the mouth of the Gironde with the loss of all on board. |
| Highgate, and Sovereign | United Kingdom; Dominion of Canada | The steamship Highgate collided with the full-rigged ship Sovereign and sank off Lundy Island, Devon. Thirteen of her nineteen crew were landed at Milford Haven, Pembrokeshire and a boat with six crew was reported missing. Highgate was on a voyage from Mostyn, Denbighshire to Cardiff, Glamorgan. The steamship Bay Fisher was reported to have rescued nine of her crew off the Bishop Rock the next day. Sovereign also sank. She was on a voyage from Barry, Glamorgan to Halifax, Nova Scotia. |
| J. D. Spreckels, and Marion | United States | The brig J. D. Spreckels and the barquentine Marion collided at San Francisco, California and were both damaged. |
| Lancashire Lad, and Sigurd | United Kingdom | The schooner Lancashire Lad and the steamship Sigurd collided in the River Mersey. Both vessels were damaged. Sigurd was taken in to Birkenhead, Cheshire in a leaky condition. |
| Lark | United Kingdom | The ship sprang a leak and foundered off Bardsey Island, Pembrokeshire. Her crew were rescued by the tug Great Britain (United Kingdom). Lark was on a voyage from Aberavon, Glamorgan to Port Madoc, Caernarfonshire. |
| Leo | United Kingdom | The fishing dandy was driven ashore on the Isle of Wight. Her six crew took to a boat; they were rescued by the steamship Cadoxton (United Kingdom). |
| Maria | United Kingdom | The schooner was driven ashore and wrecked at Coolie Point, County Down. She was on a voyage from Garston, Lancashire to Rosstrevor, County Down. |
| Matadi | United Kingdom | The steamship ran aground in the Burbo Bank, in Liverpool Bay. She was refloated and taken in to the River Mersey. |
| Newman Hall | United Kingdom | The ship caught fire at New Orleans. The fire was extinguished. |
| Paradox | United Kingdom | The steamship was run into by the steamship Hibernian (United Kingdom) in the River Thames at the mouth of the Surrey Canal and was damaged. |
| No. 73 | United Kingdom | The ketch was driven ashore and wrecked in Moody Bay, Isle of Wight. Her crew survived. |

== 20 February ==
List of shipwrecks: 20 February 1890
| Ship | State | Description |
|---|---|---|
| Agricola, and Ringleader | United Kingdom | The brig Agricola and the brigantine Ringleader were run into by the steamship Patterdale (United Kingdom) at South Shields, County Durham and were both damaged, Ringleader severely. |
| Amethyst | United Kingdom | The steamship arrived at Reval, Russia on fire. She was on a voyage from Leith, Lothian to Reval. |
| Antelope | United Kingdom | The steamship ran aground at Weymouth, Dorset. She was on a voyage from the Channel Islands to Weymouth. |
| Cuerero | United Kingdom | The barque was driven ashore on the north coast of Bonaire, Netherlands Antilles. Her crew were rescued. She was on a voyage from Barbadoes to Aruba, Netherlands Antilles. She was a total loss. |
| Ivy | United Kingdom | The steaship was run into by the steamship River Clyde downstream of the Nore and was severely damaged. Ivy was on a voyage from Gravesend, Kent to Cardiff, Glamorgan. She put back to Gravesend. |
| Martaban | United Kingdom | The steamship ran aground in the Suez Canal. She was on a voyage from Rangoon, Burma to Liverpool, Lancashire. |
| Three Brothers | United Kingdom | The galley punt sank at Dover, Kent. Her crew were rescued. |

== 21 February ==
List of shipwrecks: 21 February 1890
| Ship | State | Description |
|---|---|---|
| Agnes | United States | The fishing schooner was wrecked on Vanquero Island, Miquelon. Her crew were rescued. |
| Christianborg | Denmark | The steamship collided with another steamship in the River Thames downstream of Gravesend, Kent, United Kingdom and was severely damaged. She was on a voyage from Gravesend to Burntisland, Fife, United Kingdom. She put back to Gravesend. |
| Derwent | United Kingdom | The ship was driven ashore on the Norwegian coast. She was on a voyage from Grimsby, Lincolnshire to Langesund, Norway. She was refloated and taken in to Mandal, Norway. |
| Don Juan | Germany | The barque ran aground in the Elbe at Finkenwerder. |
| German | United Kingdom | The steamship ran aground in the Elbe at Finkenwerder. She was refloated and resumed her voyage. |
| Gipsy Maid | United Kingdom | The schooner was driven ashore at Blackhead Point, Cornwall. She was refloated. |
| Glenfalloch | United Kingdom | The steamship was driven ashore at Blackgang Chine, Isle of Wight. She was on a voyage from London to Rangoon, Burma. She was refloated and resumed her voyage. |
| Martha | Germany | The steamship ran aground in the Elbe at Finkenwerder. |
| Neapel | Germany | The steamship ran aground in the Elbe at Finkenwerder. |
| Northgate | United Kingdom | The steamship collided with the steamship Vancouver (United Kingdom) in Liverpool Bay and was severely damaged. Northgate was on a voyage from Liverpool to Barrow-in-Furness, Lancashire. She completed her voyage. |
| Rose | United Kingdom | The ship was driven ashore and wrecked at Carnsore Point. County Wexford. She was on a voyage from Milford Haven, Pembrokeshire to Wicklow. |
| Sorrento | Germany | The steamship ran aground in the Elbe at Finkenwerder. |

== 22 February ==
List of shipwrecks: 22 February 1890
| Ship | State | Description |
|---|---|---|
| Courrières | France | The steamship sank off Le Conquet, Finistère. She was on a voyage from Boulogne, Pas-de-Calais to L'Orient, Morbihan. |
| Denderah | Germany | The steamship ran aground in the Elbe at Schulau She was refloated but ran aground again at Finkenwerder. She was refloated on 24 February with assistance. |
| Ehrenfels | Germany | The steamship ran aground in the Elbe at Finkenwerder. She was on a voyage from Bombay, India to Hamburg. She was refloated the next day and taken in to Hamburg. |
| Florence Nightingale | United Kingdom | The steamship was driven ashore near Dieppe, Seine-Inférieure, France. She subsequently broke in two. |
| Hawk | United Kingdom | The barge was run into by the steamship Glenmore (United Kingdom) and sank in the River Thames. |
| John Stevenson | United Kingdom | The steamship was driven ashore at Gravelines, Nord. She was refloated. |
| Lady Ailsa | United Kingdom | The steamship was driven ashore and wrecked at Le Croisic, Loire-Inférieure, France. Her crew were rescued by the fishing boat Courbet and the lighthouse tender Avel (both France) Lady Ailsa was on a voyage from Saint-Nazaire, Loire-Inférieure, France to Santander, Spain. |
| Lucia | Western Australia | The ship ran aground on her anchor at Perth and was holed, becoming severely leaky. |
| Marguerite | Italy | The steamship was driven ashore at Grado. She was on a voyage from Venice to Trieste. |
| Rempha | Flag unknown | The steamship was driven ashore near Fort Saint Elmo, Malta. |
| St. Georg | Germany | The steamship was driven ashore and wrecked at Mogador, Morocco. She was on a voyage from Hamburg to Mogador. |
| Susie | United States | The steamship was destroyed by fire at Devils Elbow, Apalachicola, Florida. |
| Whitehall | United Kingdom | The steamship ran aground near Bristol, Gloucestershire. She was on a voyage from Burriana, Spain to Bristol. She was refloated. |

== 23 February ==
List of shipwrecks: 23 February 1890
| Ship | State | Description |
|---|---|---|
| Alboraca | Spain | The steamship ran aground whilst departing from Bilbao for New York, United States. She proceede on her voyage, but consequently put in to Santander for repairs. |
| Oriental | United Kingdom | The steamship ran aground at Malta and was damaged. She was on a voyage from Shanghai, China to London. She was refloated, and resumed her voyage on 27 February. |
| Star | United Kingdom | The ketch ran aground and sank at Margate, Kent. She was on a voyage from London to Bridgwater, Somerset. |
| William Henry | United Kingdom | The ship was abandoned a few miles off the Wolf Rock, Cornwall. Presumed subsequently foundered. |
| Twelve unnamed vessels | United Kingdom | The barges were destroyed at Blackwall, London by an explosion which wrecked a chemicals factory. |

== 24 February ==
List of shipwrecks: 24 February 1890
| Ship | State | Description |
|---|---|---|
| Boadicea | United Kingdom | The ship departed from Port Dinorwic, Caernarfonshire for Montrose, Forfarshire. No further trace, reported overdue. |
| Commerce | United Kingdom | The steamship ran aground on the Four Flat, off Piriac-sur-Mer, Loire-Inférieure, France. |
| Claymore, and Coriolanus | United Kingdom | The steamship Claymore and the barque Coriolanus collided 400 nautical miles (740 km) west of the Fastnet Rock. Coriolanus sank and Claymore was abandoned. Their crews were rescued by the steamship Queensmore (United Kingdom). Claymore was on a voyage from Norfolk, Virginia, United States to Liverpool, Lancashire. She was subsequently discovered by the steamship Bostonian (United Kingdom), which put part of her crew aboard. The took her in to Cork, where she arrived on 5 March. Coriolanus was on a voyage from Iquique, Peru to a British port. |
| Fulmar | United Kingdom | The steamship struck rocks at The Smalls, off the coast of Pembrokeshire and was holed. She was on a voyage from Antwerp, Belgium to the Clyde. She put in to Milford Haven, Pembrokeshire. |
| Hebe | United Kingdom | The barque capsized in the Atlantic Ocean. Her crew were rescued by the steamship Colonist (United Kingdom). Hebe was on a voyage from St. John's, Newfoundland Colony to Porto, Portugal and/or Barcelona, Spain. |
| Jane Gwynne | United Kingdom | The schooner collided with a Spanish steamship and sank in the River Mersey at Liverpool, Lancashire. Her four crew survived. She was on a voyage from Runcorn, Cheshire to Port Dinorwic, Caernarfonshire. |
| Lord Raglan | United Kingdom | The ship departed from San Francisco, California, United States for Queenstown, County Cork. No further trace, reported overdue, feared lost with all on board. |
| Scandia | Flag unknown | The steamship ran aground at the mouth of the Lühe. |

== 25 February ==
List of shipwrecks: 25 February 1890
| Ship | State | Description |
|---|---|---|
| Avant-Garde | French Navy | The torpedo boat ran aground and was wrecked on the Costa de Mire, Portugal. Her crew were rescued. |
| Corona | United States | The steam yacht sank at Weymouth, Massachusetts. |
| Elizabeth Peers | United Kingdom | The schooner was damaged by an onboard explosion at Dublin. |
| Gotha | United Kingdom | The steamship ran aground in the River Ouse at Goole, Yorkshire. She was refloated with assistance the next day and taken in to Goole. |
| John and George | United Kingdom | The barge was run into by the collier Nina (United Kingdom) and sank in the River Thames at Wapping, London. |
| Unnamed | Flag unknown | The schooner ran aground on the Maplin Sand, in the North Sea off the coast of Essex, United Kingdom. |
| Unnamed | French Navy | The torpedo boat ran aground off Costa-de-Mira, Portugal. |

== 26 February ==
List of shipwrecks: 26 February 1890
| Ship | State | Description |
|---|---|---|
| Algiers | United States | The steamship was driven ashore at New York. She was on a voyage from Galveston, Texas to New York. She was refloated. |
| Confidence | United Kingdom | The steamship ran aground at Troon, Ayrshire. She was on a voyage from Londonderry to Troon. She was refloated. |
| Esperanza | Sweden | The schooner struck the pier at South Shields, County Durham, United Kingdom and was severely damaged. |
| Garonne | Norway | The steamship ran aground at "Laurkullen" She was refloated and resumed her voyage. |
| Katu Maru | Japan | The schooner sank off the coast of Japan in a cyclone with the loss of 35 of the 45 people on board. She was on a voyage from Hakodadi to Yesso. |
| Navarra | United Kingdom | The steamship ran aground in the River Thames at Northfleet, Kent. She was refloated. |
| Newquay | United Kingdom | The steamship ran aground at Baltimore, Maryland, United States. She was on a voyage from Cartagena, Spain to Baltimore. She was refloated. |
| Palawan | France | The ship ran aground in the River Plate. She was on a voyage from Antwerp, Belgium to Buenos Aires, Argentina. |
| San Martin | France | The steamship ran aground near Équihen-Plage, Pas-de-Calais. |
| Varr | Norway | The ship was wrecked on the Carr Rock, in the Firth of Forth with the loss of all hands. |
| No. 8 | United Kingdom | The pilot boat collided with the steamship Rydal Water (United Kingdom) and sank in the River Mersey. Her crew were rescued by Rydal Water. |

== 27 February ==
List of shipwrecks: 27 February 1890
| Ship | State | Description |
|---|---|---|
| Beatrice | United Kingdom | The steamship was driven ashore near Garston, Lancashire. She was refloated on 30 March. |
| Liberal | Norway | The ship was wrecked near North Berwick, Lothian, United Kingdom with the loss of all hands. |
| Saphir | Norway | The schooner ran aground at "Skjoereg". She was refloated the next day and towed in to Porsgrunn in a leaky condition. |
| Shark | United Kingdom | The steamship ran aground at Irvine, Ayrshire. She was on a voyage from Irvine to Newry, County Down. |

== 28 February ==
List of shipwrecks: 28 February 1890
| Ship | State | Description |
|---|---|---|
| Allegro | United Kingdom | The schooner was run into by the schooner Lapwing (United Kingdom) off Dungeness, Kent and was severely damaged. Allegro was on a voyage from Hull, Yorkshire to Guernsey, Channel Islands. She completed her voyage in a leaky condition. |
| Blythswood | United Kingdom | The ship was driven ashore on the coast of the Cape Colony and was damaged. She was on a voyage from Penarth, Glamorgan to Table Bay. She was refloated. |
| Ehrenfels | Germany | The steamship was run into by the steamship Lapland (United Kingdom) at Hamburg and was damaged. |
| Franziska | Germany | The ship ran aground at Fécamp, Seine-Inférieure, France. She was on a voyage from Grangemouth, Stirlingshire, United Kingdom to Fécamp. She was refloated. |
| Joseph Nicholson | United Kingdom | The schooner ran aground at Glasson Dock, Lancashire. She was on a voyage from Glasson Dock to Port Madoc, Caernarfonshire. |
| Paragon | United Kingdom | The schooner was driven ashore at "West Sutor". She was on a voyage from Inverness to Invergordon, Ross-shire. She was refloated with assistance from the steamship Ranger (United Kingdom). |
| Quetta | United Kingdom | The steamship struck an uncharted rock in the Torres Strait and sank with the loss of 134 lives. She was on a voyage from Brisbane, Queensland to London. |
| Tonquin | Flag unknown | The barque was abandoned in the Atlantic Ocean (41°48′N 43°24′W). Her crew were rescued by the steamship California (United Kingdom). |

== Unknown date ==
List of shipwrecks: Unknown date in February 1890
| Ship | State | Description |
|---|---|---|
| Agra | Norway | The barque ran aground off St. John's Point. She was refloated and take in to Savannah-la-Mar, Georgia, United States, where she arrived on 25 February. |
| Ambaca | Portugal | The steamship was driven ashore at New Romney, Kent, United Kingdom. She was on a voyage from Hull, Yorkshire, United Kingdom to Lisbon. She was refloated and resumed her voyage. |
| Autocrat | United Kingdom | The steamship was driven ashore at Smyrna, Russia. She was refloated on 3 February and resumed her voyage. |
| Belle Higgins | United States | The schooner was run into by the steamship La Champagne (France) at New York and cut in two. Her crew survived. |
| Bergenhuus | Denmark | The steamship was driven ashore at Korsør. She was on a voyage from Hamburg,Germany to Nakskov. She was refloated on 11 February. |
| Black Sea | United Kingdom | The steamship was wrecked at Bayonne, Pyrénées-Atlantiques. |
| Catalina | Argentina | The barque was driven ashore near Montevideo, Uruguay. She was a total loss. |
| Clapeyron | United Kingdom | The steamship was driven ashore at Buceo, Uruguay. She was refloated. |
| Duburg | Germany | The steamship was lost in a typhoon off the coast of China, possibly on 17 February. Four hundred people were killed. |
| Excelsior | Flag unknown | The steamship ran aground at the mouth of the Patapsco River, Maryland, United States. She was on a voyage from Baltimore, Maryland to Bayonne, Pyrénées-Atlantiques, France. She was refloated and resumed her voyage. |
| George and Mary | United Kingdom | The schooner collided with the steamship Abergrange (United Kingdom) and was damaged. George and Mary was on a voyage from Antwerp, Belgium to Swansea, Glamorgan. She put in to Vlissingen, Zeeland, Netherlands. |
| Georghios | Romania | The lighter was driven ashore by ice at "Hazirdjil" and damaged. She was refloated. |
| Hope | Flag unknown | The steamship was driven ashore 27 nautical miles (50 km) from Victoria, British Columbia, Dominion of Canada. She had been refloated by 26 February and take in to San Francisco, California, United States. |
| Isle of Iona | United Kingdom | The steamship ran aground in Creach Bay, Ouessant, Finistère, France before 6 February. She was on a voyage from Middlesbrough, Yorkshire to Bilbao, Spain. she was refloated and taken in to Newport, Monmouthshire. |
| Joequinna | United Kingdom | The barque was wrecked on the Rocas Atoll, Brazil. Her crew survived. She was on a voyage from Wilmington, North Carolina, United States to Santos, Brazil. |
| John | United Kingdom | The ship was driven ashore on Inchkeith, Fife. She subsequently became a wreck. |
| Kingsdale | United Kingdom | The steamship ran aground in the Patapsco River. She was on a voyage from a Spanish port to Baltimore. She was refloated. |
| Line | Norway | The schooner ran aground in the Christianiafjord before 28 February. She was on a voyage from Christiania to Concarneau, Finistère, France. She was refloated the next day and towed in to Moss. |
| Louisa | Flag unknown | The steamship ran aground at "Kvalo Brand". She was later refloated and taken in to Trondheim, Norway. |
| Lucas | Romania | The lighter was damaged by ice at "Hazirdjil". |
| Malfrideer | Denmark | The schooner was lost on the coast of Iceland. Her crew were rescued. |
| Marie Joseph | United Kingdom | The brigantine sprang a leak 100 nautical miles (190 km) off Bilbao, Spain and was abandoned on or before 8 February. Her six crew were rescued by the steamship St. Joseph (France). |
| Merannio | United Kingdom | The steamship ran aground at Europa Point, Gibraltar. She was on a voyage from Bôna, Algeria to Gibraltar. She was refloated and taken in to Gibraltar in a leaky condition. She was found to be severely damaged. Merannio was subsequently repaired at Cádiz. |
| Meteor | United Kingdom | The barque was abandoned at sea with the loss of two of her crew. Survivors were rescued by the steamship Merango (United Kingdom). Meteor was on a voyage from Cardiff, Glamorgan to St. John's, Newfoudland. |
| Moscow | United Kingdom | The steamship was wrecked at Dénia, Spain before 2 February. |
| Neptune | Denmark | The brig was abandoned in the Atlantic Ocean. She was on a voyage from Corrientes, Argentina to Falmouth, Cornwall, United Kingdom. She was subsequently discovered by Rose C. (Flag unknown), which put some of her crew aboard. |
| Newnham | United Kingdom | The steamship was wrecked on the Dutch coast. |
| North Perle | Flag unknown | The steamship was driven ashore at Porto Alegre, Brazil. She was on a voyage from Hamburg, Germany to Rio de Janeiro, Brazil. |
| Oakdene | United Kingdom | The steamship was driven ashore at Bilbao, Spain. She was refloated and towed in to Bilbao. |
| Pasqualeno | United States | The ship ran aground at Palermo, Sicily, Italy and was severely damaged. She was on a voyage from Bangor, Maine to Palermo. |
| Povas | Norway | The barque was abandoned in the Atlantic Ocean. Nine of her crew were rescued by the barque Truro (Flag unknown). |
| Prescott Hazeltine | United States | The schooner was destroyed by fire at sea. She was on a voyage from Portland, Maine to Martinique. |
| Reaper | United Kingdom | The ship was driven ashore at Padstow, Cornwall. She was refloated on 14 February and beached. |
| Rivas | Spain | The steamship ran aground at "Galea" before 6 February. She was refloated. |
| Rosedale | Norway | The barque was abandoned in the Atlantic Ocean. Her crew were rescued by the steamship Lake Ontario (Dominion of Canada). Rosedale was on a voyage from the Milk River, Jamaica to the Clyde. |
| Sakkarah | Germany | The steamship was wrecked at Remedio Point, El Salvador. Her crew were rescued. |
| Sierra Colonna | United Kingdom | The steamship ran aground on the Agnada Reef, in the Bay of Bengal before 5 February. She was on a voyage from Liverpool to Madras, India. She was refloated and taken in to Rangoon, Burma in a severely leaky condition. |
| Sikh | United Kingdom | The ship was driven ashore in the Torres Straits. She was on a voyage from a Chinese port to Sydney, New South Wales. She was refloated and completed her voyage, arriving on 26 February. |
| South Glen | United Kingdom | The barque was wrecked at Valparaíso, Chile. Her crew were rescued. She was on a voyage from South Shields, County Durham to Valparaíso. |
| Stad Nieuwport | Belgium | The steamship was driven ashore at Saltfleet, Lincolnshire, United Kingdom. She was on a voyage from Gravelines, Nord, France to Hull, Yorkshire, United Kingdom. She was refloated with the assistance of a tug and completed her voyage. |
| Theodore | Romania | The lighter was damaged by ice at "Hazirdjil". |
| Turdon | United States | The schooner capsized and foundered in the Pacific Ocean. Her crew were rescued by the schooner George Noble (United Kingdom). Turdon was on a voyage from the Gilbert and Ellice Islands to Sydney, New South Wales. |
| Victoria | Norway | The ship capsized in the North Sea before 5 February. She was towed in to Jøssingfjord in a capsized condition on that date. |
| William Henry | United Kingdom | The schooner collided with the yawl Proceed (United Kingdom) and was abandoned off the coast of Cornwall. Her crew survived. |
| Wiltshire | United Kingdom | The steamship ran aground on the Nore. She was refloated. |
| Ydun | Denmark | The steam coaster collided with the steamship Perwie (Denmark) and was damaged. |
| Unnamed | Imperial British East Africa Company | A dhow, carrying gunpowder and ammunition, exploded on a Ugandan lake killing twelve Arab chiefs and 200 fighting slaves. |
| Unnamed | Flag unknown | The ship foundered in the English Channel 6 nautical miles (11 km) north of Calais, France on or before 7 February. |
| Unnamed | Flag unknown | The ship was wrecked on Vargas Island, British Columbia, Dominion of Canada with the loss of all on board. |
