= Río Bueno =

Río Bueno (Spanish: "good river") may refer to:

- Río Bueno, Chile
- Bueno River, Chile
- Rio Bueno, Jamaica, a port in the parish of Trelawny
- Rio Bueno (Jamaica), a river
