= Broad River (Jamaica) =

Coordinates: 18°02′N 77°51′W

Location
- Country: Jamaica

The Broad River is a river in Jamaica. It flows into the Black River at the Great Morass in St. Elizabeth.

== See also ==
- List of rivers of Jamaica
