= One Eye River =

Location
- Country: Jamaica

Physical characteristics
- Source
  - location: See text of article
  - elevation: About 950 feet (290 m)
- Mouth
  - location: Confluence with the Black River
  - coordinates: 18.178188°N 77.696128°W
  - elevation: About 450 feet (140 m)

Basin features
- Tributaries
  - right: Rotten Gut River

The One Eye River is a river in the parishes of Manchester and St Elizabeth in Jamaica. It is a tributary of the Black River.

== Course ==
The hydrology of the area is complex, with several sinks and risings. As a consequence, different sources give different interpretations.

Directorate of Overseas Surveys 1:50,000 map

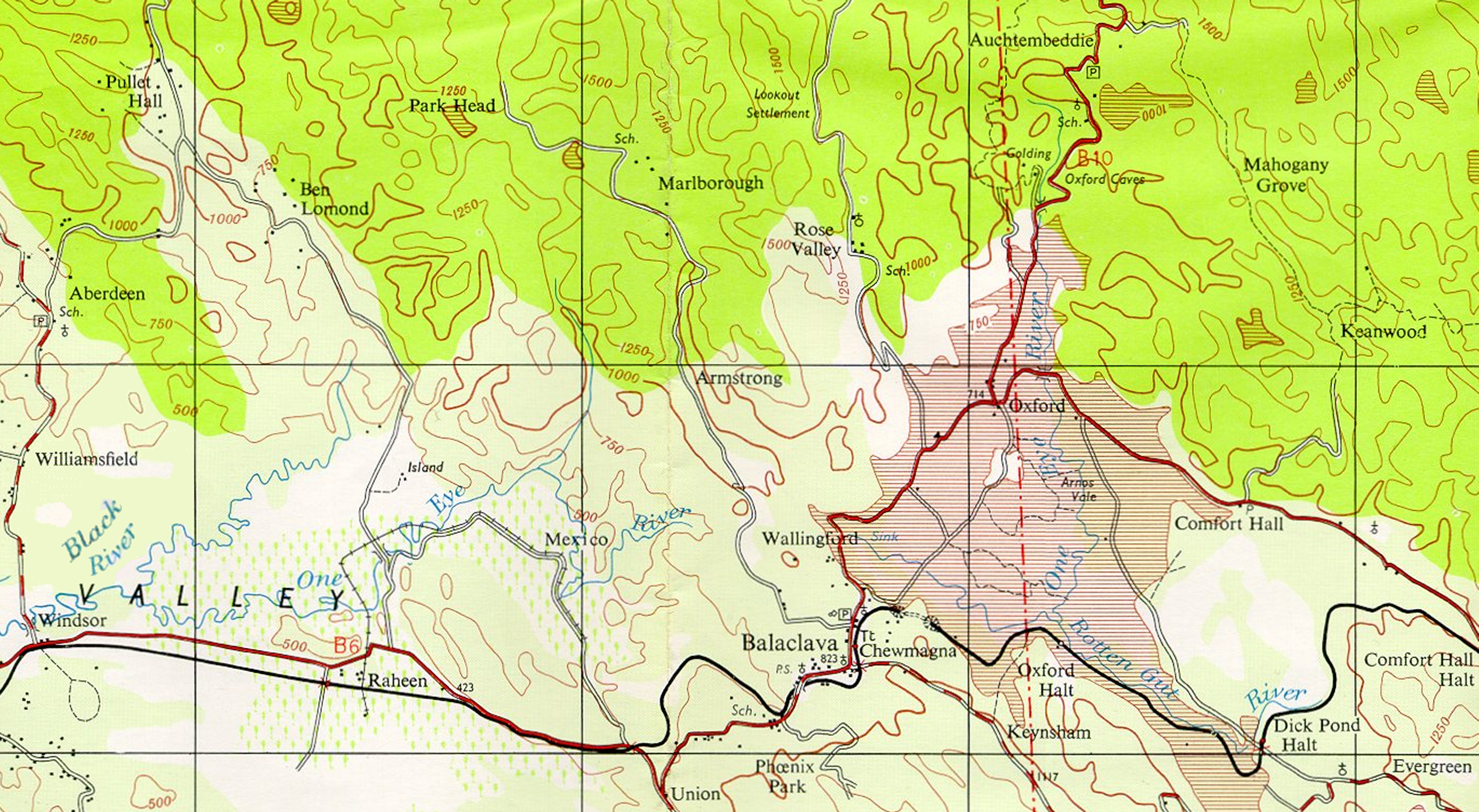
Extract from UK Directorate of Overseas Surveys 50K map of Jamaica showing the One Eye River.

The Directorate of Overseas Surveys published several editions of a 1:50,000 scale map of the island from the 1950s on. Sheet D of the first edition shows the One Eye River rising a little north of Oxford Cave and a little south of Auchtembeddie. From here it flows south to a point a little north of Oxford railway halt where it is joined by Rotten Gut River, its only tributary. From here it swings north west to Wallingford where it disappears into a sink at the eastern foot of a 250 feet (76 m) high north-south ridge. It reappears on the western side of the ridge, still called One Eye River, where it continues on a generally westward course, now very sinuously through the fields of a sugar estate, eventually joining the Black River a little to the east of Windsor.

There is no mention of a Coffee River on this map.

Jamaica Underground (book)

This states on page 37 that the One Eye River is derived from the Coffee River which rises in the Coffee River Cave. This was shown by the 1965-1966 Karst Hydrology Expedition using a soluble dye to be a continuation of the Hectors River after its disappearance into Hectors River Sink 1.

Wording on page 37 also implies that the section of the One Eye River from its confluence with the Rotten Gut River to the Wallingford Sink is sometimes called the Rotten Gut River.

The remainder of the description in this book matches what is depicted on the Directorate of Overseas Surveys map.

== See also ==
- List of rivers of Jamaica
