= Rotten Gut River =

- Source of Rotten Gut River (Jamaica)

Location
- Country: Jamaica

Physical characteristics
- Source
  - location: A rising south-west of Comfort Hall, Manchester, Jamaica
  - coordinates: 18°10′44″N 77°36′24″W
  - elevation: About 900 feet (270 m)
- Mouth
  - location: Confluence with the One Eye River
  - coordinates: 18°10′32″N 77°37′35″W
  - elevation: About 700 feet (210 m)
- Length: 2.9 miles (4.7 km)

The Rotten Gut River is a short river in the parish of Manchester, Jamaica and a tributary of the One Eye River.

== Course ==
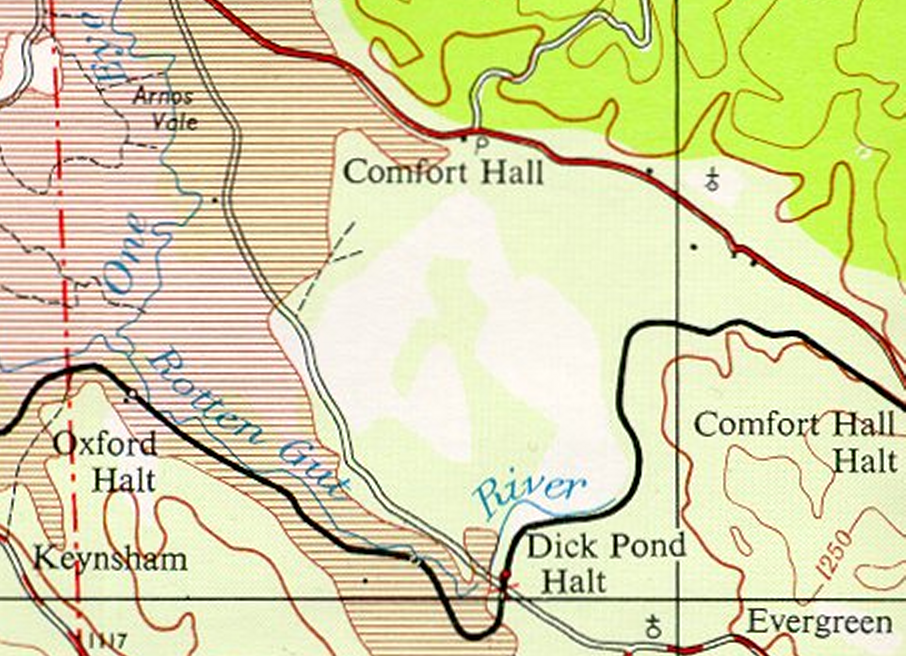
Extract from UK Directorate of Overseas Surveys 50K map of Jamaica showing the One Eye River.

The Rotten Gut River rises to the south-west of Comfort Hall, a small village, and flows south, then west then north in a large loop through the hamlet of Dick or Duck Pond, which brings it back to the same latitude it started from before heading generally north-west to its confluence with the One Eye River a little north of Oxford railway halt.

The Wording in Finchman 1998 implies that the section of the One Eye River from its confluence with the Rotten Gut River to the Wallingford Sink is sometimes (wrongly) called Rotten Gut River.

== Infrastructure ==
This being a short river there is very little infrastructure, just two road bridges:

- A road bridge over the river in Dick or Duck Pond.
- A road bridge over the river in Comfort Hall.

It is perhaps worth noting that the river is significant enough to cause the railway to follow just to the south of it as it makes its large loop to the south through Dick or Duck Pond hamlet.

== See also ==
- List of rivers of Jamaica
