= Guava River =

Location
- Country: Jamaica

Physical characteristics
- Source
  - coordinates: 18.045461°N 76.501665°W
  - elevation: 3,000 feet (910 m)
- Mouth
  - coordinates: 18.105382°N 76.457892°W
  - elevation: 100 feet (30 m)

Basin features
- Tributaries
  - left: Three unnamed
  - right: Two unnamed

The Guava River rises just north of the Grand Ridge of the Blue Mountains on the border of Portland Parish in Jamaica. From here it runs east then north and then east again to its confluence with the Rio Grande.

As of 2010 there are no roads or settlements visible anywhere along the river's length on satellite imagery or on the earlier maps.

== See also ==
- List of rivers of Jamaica
