= Llandovery River =

Location
- Country: Jamaica

The Llandovery River is a river of Jamaica.

== See also ==
- List of rivers of Jamaica
