= Hope River (Jamaica) =

Coordinates: 17°57′N 76°43′W

Location
- Country: Jamaica

The Hope River (Jamaica) is a river of Jamaica. It flows from 15 miles north of Kingston and then forms a delta at Kingston.

== See also ==
- List of rivers of Jamaica
