= Great River (Jamaica) =

Location
- Country: Jamaica

Physical characteristics
- Source
  - coordinates: 18.207196°N 77.8835177°W
  - elevation: 1,400 feet (430 m)
- Mouth
  - coordinates: 18.449568°N 77.9922867°W
- Length: 57 mi (92 km)

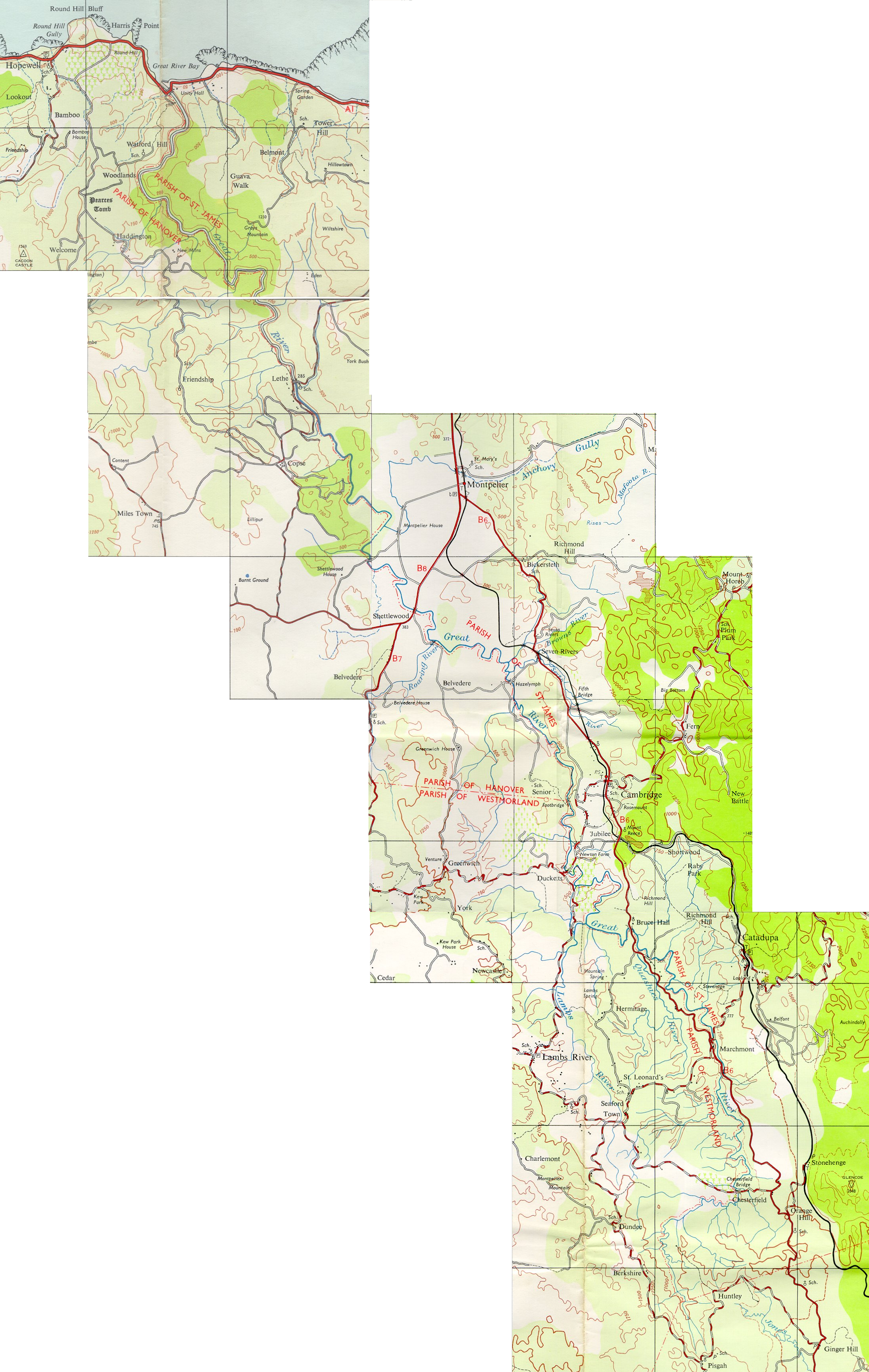
The Great River, Jamaica at 1:50,000.

The Great River (Jamaica) is one of Jamaica's major rivers, and forms the boundary of the parish of St James with Westmoreland and Hanover.

== Course ==
The Great River rises at about 1,400 feet (430 m) just north of the small village of Pisgah in the north west corner of St Elizabeth. From here it flows north north east for about 57 miles (92 km) (some sources say 46 miles (74 km)) reaching the Caribbean Sea at Great River Bay on the island's north coast, 4.5 miles (7.2 km) west of Montego Bay.

== Ecology ==
The Great River is home to the second largest tree in the island, and to crawfish.

== Tourism ==
The Great River is one of the three most popular for traditional rafting on bamboo rafts. It is also used for tube and zip line craft.

== See also ==
- List of rivers of Jamaica
