= New Savannah River =

Coordinates: 18°12′N 78°14′W

Location
- Country: Jamaica

The New Savannah River is a river of Jamaica.

== See also ==
- List of rivers of Jamaica
