= Annotto River =

Coordinates: 18°16′N 76°46′W

Location
- Country: Jamaica

The Annotto River is a river in Jamaica, located in St. Mary.

== See also ==
- List of rivers of Jamaica
