= Buff Bay River =

Coordinates: 18°14′N 76°40′W

Location
- Country: Jamaica

The Buff Bay River is a river of Jamaica, located in Portland.

== See also ==
- List of rivers of Jamaica
