= Martha Brae River =

Coordinates: 18°29′N 77°38′W

Location
- Country: Jamaica

The Martha Brae River is a river of Jamaica. It is located in Trelawny on the north coast of Jamaica, towards the western edge, about 10 kilometres (6 mi) south of Falmouth which is in Trelawny Jamaica. The river features rafting.

A small village west of the river is named Martha's Brae because of this nearby river. Northwest of the village is Gun Hill, where judge John Bradshaw was reportedly re-buried by his son James Bradshaw, to prevent desecration of his father's remains by King Charles II of England.

It is used for irragtion, rafting and water supplies. The rivers name is a corrupted version of Rio Mateberino. The story goes a Taino witch was tortured by Spanish settlers into revealing the location of a gold stash hidden along the river. After divulging, she changed the course of the water, killing the Spanish and blocking the cave where the treasure remains hidden.

== See also ==
- List of rivers of Jamaica
