= Cave River =

Coordinates: 18°12′0″N 77°21′0″W

Location
- Country: Jamaica

The Cave River is a river of Jamaica, located in Clarendon.

== See also ==
- List of rivers of Jamaica
