= Siloah, Jamaica =

Settlement in Jamaica

Coordinates: 18.169°N 77.708°W

Location of Siloah in Jamaica

Siloah is a settlement in Jamaica whose existence dates to between the mid 1700s and the early 1800s. It has a population of 2,653 as of 2009. Siloah's economy revolves around the tourist attraction Appleton Sugar Estate, established in 1749, which produces sugar and rum. Their primary school was started in 1825 and the Black River, one of Jamaica's longest rivers runs through the Appleton property. Siloah is also home to West Indies wicket keeper Chadwick Walton.
