= Stony River (Jamaica) =

Location
- Country: Jamaica

Physical characteristics
- Source
  - coordinates: 18.07545°N 76.85238°W
  - elevation: c2,300 feet (700 m)
- Mouth
  - elevation: c1,000 feet (300 m)

The Stony River (Jamaica) rises just north of Coopers Hill in Saint Catherine Parish, Jamaica. From here it flows primarily north until it reaches its confluence with the New River.

== See also ==
- List of rivers of Jamaica
