= Smith River (Jamaica) =

Coordinates: 18°06′N 77°43′W

Location
- Country: Jamaica

The Smith River is a river in Jamaica.

== See also ==
- List of rivers of Jamaica
