= Ferry River =

River in St. Elizabeth

Coordinates: 18°1′0″N 76°52′0″W

Location
- Country: Jamaica

The Ferry River is a river of Jamaica, located in Saint Catherine.

== See also ==
- List of rivers of Jamaica
