= Rio Doro =

Coordinates: 18°06′N 77°00′W

Location
- Country: Jamaica

The Rio Doro is a river of Jamaica.

== See also ==
- List of rivers of Jamaica
