= Orange River (Jamaica) =

Location
- Country: Jamaica

The Orange River is a river of Jamaica.

== See also ==
- List of rivers of Jamaica
