= Rio Magno =

Coordinates: 18°08′N 77°02′W

Location
- Country: Jamaica

The Rio Magno is a tributary river which meets and flows into the Rio Cobre in the town of Linstead, Saint Catherine Parish, Jamaica which in turn flows into the Caribbean Sea.

== See also ==
- List of rivers of Jamaica
