= Coleburns Gully =

Coordinates: 17°54′N 77°04′W

Location
- Country: Jamaica

Coleburns Gully is a river of Jamaica, located in St. Catherine.

== See also ==
- List of rivers of Jamaica
