= Water resources management in Jamaica =

- Withdrawals by sector 2000: Domestic: 34.1%; Agriculture: 48.8%; Industry: 17%
- Renewable water resources: 9.4 km^{3}
- Surface water produced internally: 5.5 km^{3}
- Groundwater recharge: 3.89 km^{3}
- Overlap shared by surface water and groundwater: 0 km^{3}
- Renewable water resources per capita: 3,473 m^{3}/year
- Wetland designated as Ramsar sites: 37,765 ha

The management of Jamaica's freshwater resources is primarily the domain and responsibility of the National Water Commission (NWC). The duties of providing service and water infrastructure maintenance for rural communities across Jamaica are shared with the Parish Councils. Where possible efficiencies have been identified, the NWC has outsourced various operations to the private sector.

Water supplies are adequate to meet the demands of all sectors; however, the supplies are not located close to where most of the population lives. This has created inconsistent delivery of water to the citizens and has fostered new efforts at improving the water delivery systems of Jamaica. Other challenges include the lack of clear communication and effective coordination between the relevant water management institutions, however efforts are being made here as well to correct this deficiency.

Physical water resources in Jamaica consist of ample groundwater captured in both limestone and alluvial aquifers and many important rivers that provide a good source of water for the agriculture communities of the rural highlands and coastal lowlands. Groundwater provides about 85% of the country's water needs. The NWC satisfies about 78% of the total demand for water, whereby approximately 95% of the urban population has access to water while only about 75% of the rural populations have obtained access.

Important to the recent history of Jamaica freshwater water legislation is the Water Resources Act of 1995 that created a National Water Plan. This water plan set out to develop, protect, and better manage the water resources of Jamaica so that a growing unmet demand for water could be addressed and successfully resolved.

== Water management challenges ==
There is concern that over-exploitation, industrial effluents and sewage wastes are affecting aquifers and surface waters at an alarming rate. As much as 10% of the groundwater resource has been either abandoned or use is restricted due to saline intrusion or pollution. Fifty percent of the unused water resources in the Liguanea Basin serving the Kingston and St. Andrew area are contaminated with nitrates.

While water coverage is good at around 95%, reliability of supply to urban households and industrial users is often erratic. Sufficient water exists in the island to meet all water demands, but the water resources are not necessarily located close to the major centers of water use. The infrastructure to move water to the areas where it is needed is inadequate in some parts of the country. The root of Jamaica's problems in the urban water sector are complex. Difficulty in securing the proper financial resources is problematic as the National Water Commission (NWC) has incurred losses. The NWC comes close to covering its operating costs, but does not generate any surplus, therefore finances for investment are not available.

To help deal with the cash shortfalls, the NWC relies on the Government to finance new infrastructure. Competing demands on the Government's budget mean that this source has not been adequate to provide for the water infrastructure needs of the country. In spite of numerous interventions by the Government to make the NWC more commercially focused, the desired results have not been achieved for a number of reasons, including: i) the absence of timely and adequate tariff adjustments; ii) an increase in the area served by the NWC; iii) and insufficient capital to upgrade the water facilities and infrastructures.

Providing water to rural residents is a considerable challenge as well. Lower population densities mean that the cost of water provision in rural areas is often higher than in urban areas, while lower incomes in many rural areas make it difficult for some customers to meet the full cost of high quality services. This decreases the likelihood that the private sector will be willing to engage into the rural water sector.

== Water resource base ==
Mean annual rainfall in Jamaica is not even across the island. Much of the rainfall results from northeasterly trade winds which release most of their moisture on the northern slopes of the Blue mountain range. Annual rainfall in the northeastern mountain slopes is normally between 3,000 and 5,000 mm (118 to 196 inches) whereas rainfall averages in the south coastal plains is much less at around 1,500 mm (60 inches).

The most significant rains fall in October and May while the dry season lasts from December to April. Fifty-six percent of the average annual rainfall are lost to evapotranspiration. Due to its geographic location, Jamaica is regularly in the path of tropical storms and hurricanes during the period of July to November. These storms are of high intensity and great magnitudes characterized by flood-producing rainfall amounts.

=== Groundwater and Surface water resources ===
The internal renewable water resources (IRWR) are 9.4 km^{3}/year, with 5.5 and 3.9 km^{3}/year for surface and groundwater respectively. Approximately 44% of these IRWR are considered exploitable or reliable. Of the total reliable yield of 4.09 km^{3}/year, 80% is contributed from the limestone aquifer, 4% from the alluvial aquifer which is made up of sediments (sand, silt, clay, gravel) and 16% from surface water runoff. About 20% of the limestone aquifer is developed with wells, mainly in the Río Cobre and Rio Minho regions. In most other basins, the base flow is adequate to supply water and can be exploited through developments on the rivers.

=== Major rivers, lakes & reservoirs ===
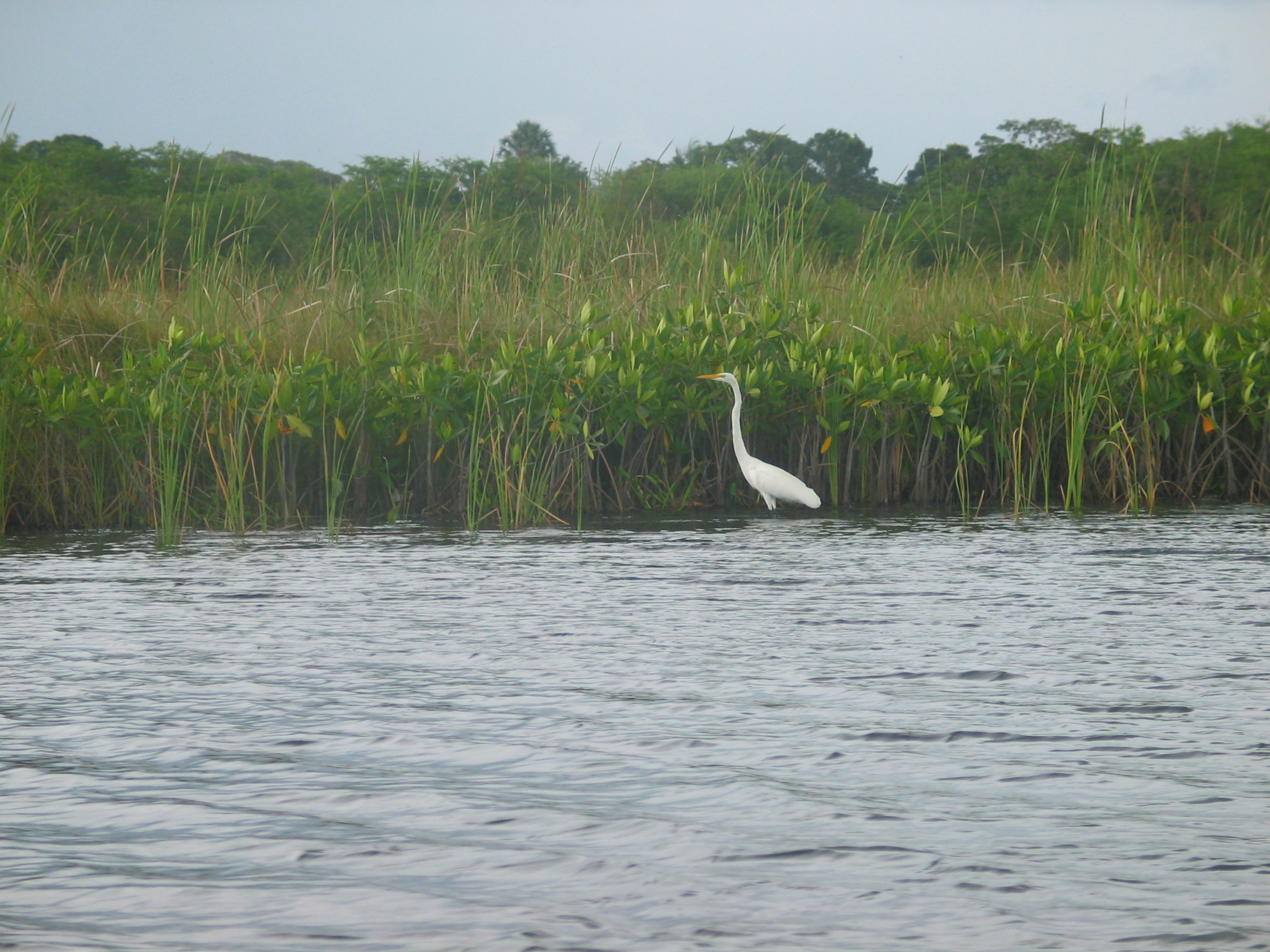
The Black River.

There are two major raw water storage facilities, both located in St. Andrew. The Mona Reservoir, with intakes at the Hope and Yallahs Rivers, has a storage capacity of 3.67 million m^{3}. Hermitage Reservoir with intakes at Ginger River and Wag/Morsham River, has a storage capacity 1.78 million m^{3}.

Jamaica counts over one hundred rivers and many are still unexplored due to their significant fall from the mountainous regions. For the most part, the rivers are used for irrigation and as a resource for domestic uses. Two important rivers in Jamaica include the Black River and the Rio Minho. The Black river is 53.4 km long and is used for tourism, irrigation, and transporting trees to the Caribbean ports where they are then sent to England. The Rio Minho is the longest river in Jamaica at nearly 93 km with headwaters originating in the geographic center of the country.

=== Water quality ===
Managing Director of the Water Resources Authority (WRA), Basil Fernandez, has expressed his view that Jamaica's water quality is among the best in the world. He stated in 2008 on the Jamaica Information Service that, "you have to remember that our water is not tainted by pharmaceuticals and chemicals found in water from other countries,". Mr. Fernandez added that, "the high quality of water is also a result of the rigorous process of water treatment that we have. In fact, people in many other countries do not drink the water that is provided from their municipal service. In Jamaica, we have stringently sought to achieve the World Health Organization (WHO) and the Ministry of Health's water quality standards".

However, a study published in 2010 by a researcher at Missouri State University raises some concern about the quality of Jamaica's water in an important region of Jamaica, the Bluefields Bay watershed. The research indicates that water supplies for drinking water and ecological support in Jamaica are threatened due to poverty and poor infrastructure. Domestic and commercial activities pollute rivers and coastal waters as well. The report goes on to say that the best water quality is found at sites where stream systems filter water through healthy wetland environments, and at sites further away from settled areas and lined with larger riparian corridors. The worst water quality is normally located in streams that have little or no riparian zones and are heavily used for washing clothes.

Major water basins of Jamaica
Hydrographic Basin	Surface Area (km^{2})	Rainfall totals (million m^{3})	Evapotranspiration (million m^{3})	Surface water runoff (million m^{3})	Groundwater discharge (million m^{3})
Blue Mountains, South	678	1,694	912	662	147
Kingston	202	312	208	81	50
Río Cobre	1,283	2,009	1,450	177	472
Río Minho	1,700	2,420	1,641	225	593
Black River	1,460	2,530	1,530	346	654
Cabarita River	924	1,890	1,019	366	451
Great River	791	1,685	863	467	355
Martha Brae, River	756	1,154	673	279	201
Dry Harbour Mountains	1,362	2,450	1,302	457	691
Blue Mountains, North	1,597	5,068	2,346	2,452	278
Total	10,753		11,906	5,512	3,892

== Water resources management by sector ==
=== Water coverage and usage ===
Only 11% of the surface water and 25% of groundwater of the exploitable water resources were utilized as of 1998. The National Water Commission (NWC) provides water to various supply systems from wells, rivers and springs. A total of 500 water-supply facilities are operated by the NWC and supply 78% of total demand. Access to water supply in 1998 was available to 75% of the rural population and to 95% of those residing in urban areas. Access to water supply via house connections was available to approximately 65% of the population.

The remaining 35% of the population were supplied through a variety of standpipes, rainwater collection systems, water trucks, wayside tanks, and community catchment tanks. Annual water withdrawal in 2002 was estimated in 0.41 billion m^{3} and the agricultural sector was the major user of water (48%). The other major water users were domestic water supply 34%, industry 17% and tourism 1%. About 92% of the water was withdrawn from groundwater sources and the remainder from surface water.

=== Irrigation ===
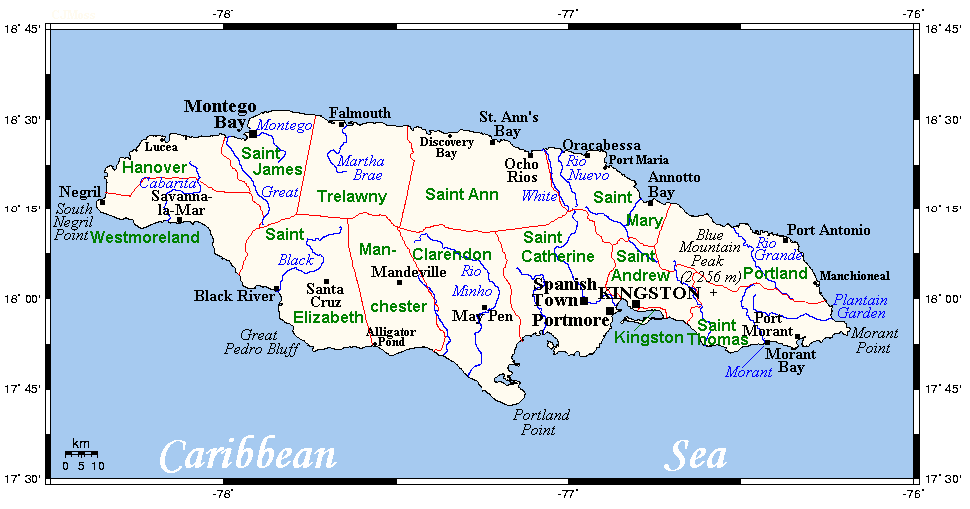
A map of Jamaica.

According to the National Irrigation Development Plan (NIDP) suitable areas for irrigation are classified into three land categories: i) lands which may be irrigated with all common techniques of irrigation; ii) lands suited only to sprinkler and micro-irrigation techniques; and iii), lands with generally steep slopes (>10%), shallow top soils which are productive with careful management and manual irrigation. This third category applies mainly to small hillside farmers. By these categories, 90,811 ha were classified as either category i or ii, while 97,095 ha or 9% of the island were classified as Category iii.

Irrigation has always played a significant role in the island's agriculture, and the need to continuously improve irrigation practices has long been recognized. Over the years some of the improvements which have been made included channel lining and utilization of closed pipes in order to improve efficiency in conveyance infrastructure, the use of water measuring techniques to encourage improved management, and the use of overnight storage facilities. Approximately 9% (about 25,000 ha) of the area under cultivation are irrigated, and about 9,000 ha require rehabilitation.

Half of the total irrigated area comprises public schemes which are managed by the National Irrigation Commission (NIC), while the other half is on individual private systems and on commercial estates, where banana, papaya and sugar cane are the major crops grown. Three-quarters of the area are under surface irrigation, 17% are equipped with sprinklers and 7% with micro-irrigation or localized systems. Groundwater is being threatened by saline intrusion and contamination from industrial effluents and untreated municipal discharges. For these reasons wastewater reuse is included in the National Irrigation Development Plan (NIDP).

=== Stormwater ===
In the urban areas of Jamaica, there is a high proportion of land area covered with impermeable materials such as asphalt and concrete meaning that rainwater cannot soak into the ground, or is left to run-off into natural water courses. The Government of Jamaica is aware of existing problems and missed opportunities with urban drainage. Some of these include poorly defined institutional responsibilities, and inadequate coordination between the relevant water management institutions. Provision for drainage and maintenance of drainage systems are often inadequate as well. The result is an ongoing deterioration of road surfaces and flooding in many cases.

The Government is putting forth an effort to ensure that urban drainage is treated as an integral part of the water sector. Key objectives in this sector include: i) improving coordination between the various institutions involved in the sector; ii) improving the quality of urban drainage, both in its initial provision and its maintenance; iii) maximizing efficiency in the provision of urban drainage; iv) and reducing harmful effects on the environment by better planning for drainage discharges.

=== Hydroelectricity ===
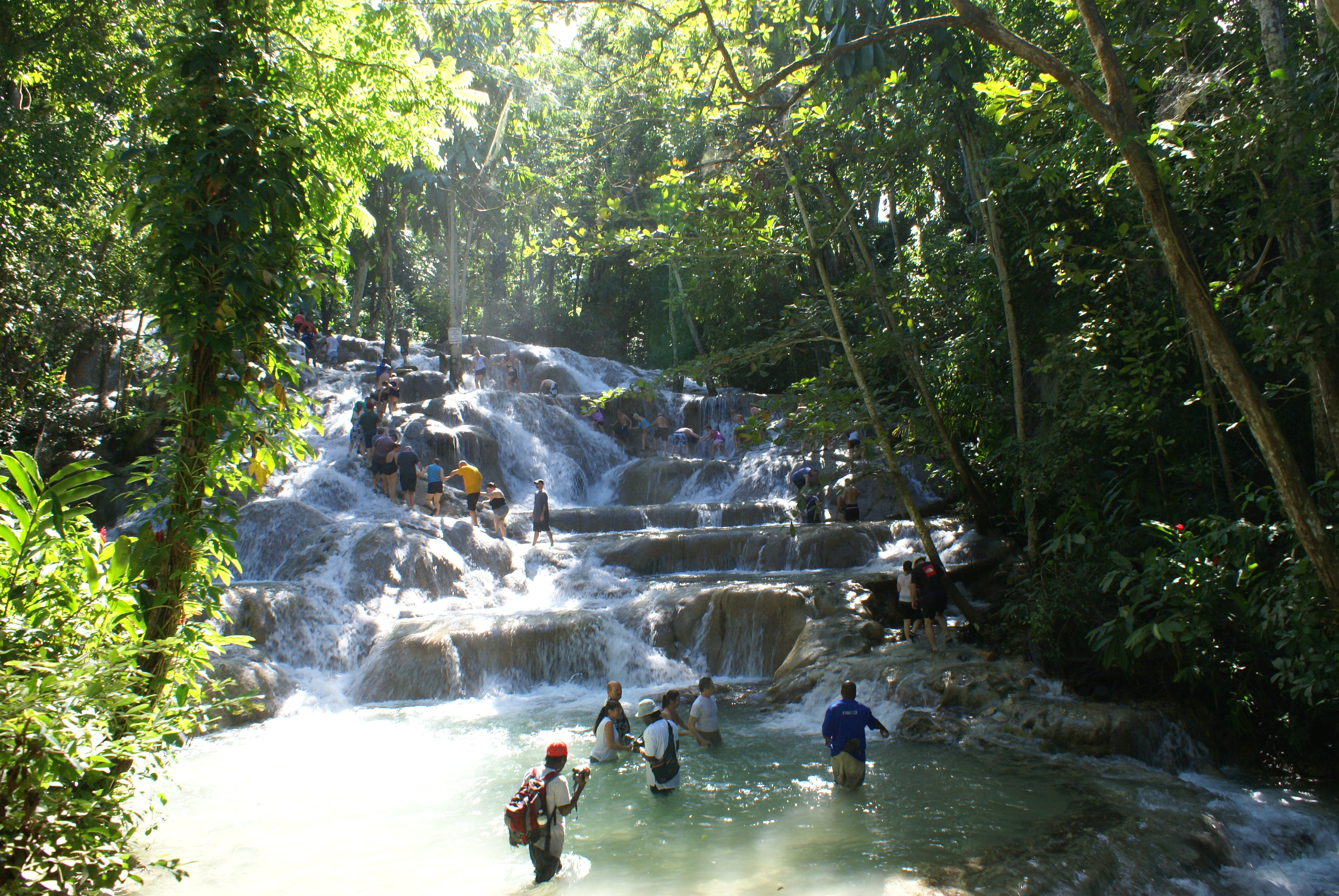
Dunn's River Falls in Ocho Ríos.

Jamaica was one of the first countries in the world to install a hydroelectricity plant, its first being located just outside Spanish Town in the 1890s. Currently there are nine hydroelectricity plants ranging from 0.2MW to 6MW with an overall generating capacity of 23 MW installed in Jamaica. There is a potential for the installation of at least an additional 30 MW of hydroelectric capacity in Jamaica. With the continued increase in global oil prices, hydroelectric power has become a priority for Jamaica, and they are now more competitive in this arena.

== Government Strategies ==
As of 2004 unmet demand for water was estimated at 220 million liters per day. Estimates at the time projected that by 2010, the unmet demand for potable water would be 320 million liters per day, if no additional capacity is put in place. The Government's strategy to satisfy this demand uses a combination of methods including new household taps, catchment tanks and the increased trucking of water. The strategy is to install piped systems where economically viable and with availability of financial resources.

The specific strategies employed were: i) the development of a Master Plan for the supply of potable water. This plan proposes solutions, taking into consideration the projected demand and the status of existing systems, water resource availability and the socioeconomic profile of communities. Securing of funds for the implementation of the Master Plan are through the Government's budget, internally generated funds from the relevant agencies, multilateral donor/lender agencies, commercial lending sources, and private sector participation.

== Legal and institutional framework ==
The NWC is Jamaica's National Water Commission and is the main provider of potable water in Jamaica. Private sector participation is encouraged to generate additional capacity through joint venture and also increase the number of licensed providers in new areas. In an effort to improve efficiency, certain aspects of NWC's operations are outsourced to the private sector. Under the Water Supply and Sewerage Services Act, a Director of Water is appointed within the Ministry with responsibility to undertake macro-scale planning for water projects.

=== Legal framework ===
The Water Resources Act (1995) was declared as a new statute in the Jamaican Parliament in September 1995 and enacted into law on April 1, 1996. This marked a 25-year effort to address the deficiencies in legislation for the proper administration, development, and optimal use of the island's water resources. The Act gives the Water Resources Authority (WRA) the responsibility for planning. A National Water Plan recommends projects and programs that should be taken in respect of the development, control, usage, and storage of water as well as its supply, distribution and disposal.

The Watersheds Protection Act (1963) is the law governing watersheds in Jamaica and is administered by the Natural Resources Conservation Authority. The primary focus of the Act is the conservation of water resources by protecting lands and riparian zones along the watersheds. The Act is intended to ensure proper land use in vital watershed areas, reduce soil erosion, maintain optimum levels of groundwater, and promote regular flows in waterways.

=== Institutional framework ===
- NWC is Jamaica's National Water Commission and is a statutory organisation charged with the responsibility of providing high quality potable water and wastewater services, maintaining the water infrastructure in good working conditions, and to protect the natural environment. Provision for rural water is shared between the NWC and the Parish Councils.
- NIC is Jamaica's National Irrigation Commission and is an agency within the Ministry of Agriculture that was established in 1986. The NIC is charged with developing irrigation systems and to provide efficient and effective irrigation services to the agricultural community. NIC duties are to manage, operate, maintain and expand irrigation systems. NIC also sets rates for irrigation water and collects these water use fees.
- WRA is Jamaica's Water Resources Authority is responsible for the management, protection, and controlled allocation and use of Jamaica's water resources. The WRA maintains a hydrological database and provides data, information, and technical assistance to government and non-government institutions.
- NEPA is the National Environment and Planning Agency and works closely with the Water Resources Authority (WRA). NEPA promotes sustainable development by ensuring protection of the environment and orderly development in Jamaica. In draft format at this time, NEPA is working to create a watershed management policy.

== Multi-lateral assistance ==
- Inter-American Development Bank has both recent and current projects that are focused on improving water resources in Jamaica. For example, the Water Resources Master Plan completed in 2008 and the Kingston Metro Water Supply project completed in 2005. The later project assisted the Government of Jamaica (GOJ) in the process of structuring a program to improve water provision in the Kingston metropolitan area by rehabilitating the water network and improving operational performance of the National Water Commission (NWC). Most recently and still in implementation phases, the Kingston Metro Water Supply Rehabilitation Project follows the development strategy of Jamaica in preserving the environment. It aims to clean the Kingston harbor by developing a comprehensive strategy of institutional strengthening of environmental institutions, as well as the construction of water pollution control facilities.
- The Jamaica Coastal Water Quality Improvement Project (CWIP) is a USAID-funded activity designed to protect and improve the environmental quality of the country's coastal water resources. The Project relies on a community-based program to tackle the problem. In implementing the project, partnerships with national agencies, national and local NGOs, community groups, and the private sector are formed. Additional focus is put on developing integrated management approaches to address water quality issues in Jamaica over the long-term.

== Water users fees ==
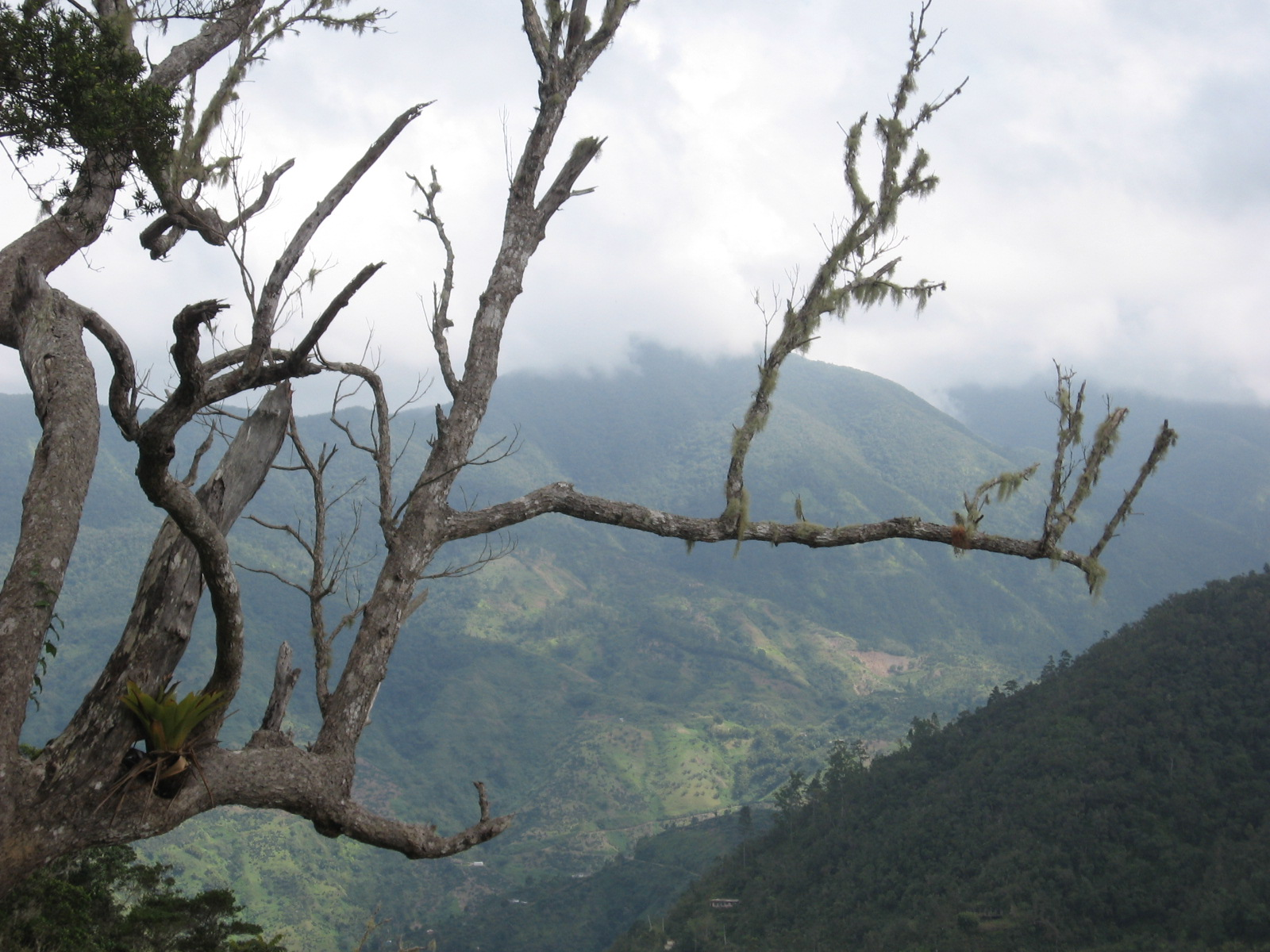
View of the Blue Mountain Range looking into St. Mary Parish from St.Andrew Parish.

Customer Type	Usage amount	Rates per 1000 L ($)
Residential	For up to 14,000 liters	$49.63
	For the next 13,000 liters	$87.51
	For the next 14,000 liters	$94.50
	For the next 14,000 liters	$120.61
	For the next 36,000 liters	$150.20
	Over 91,000 liters	$193.35
Commercial	All quantities	$186.13
Condominium	All quantities	$92.32
Primary School	All quantities	$74.47

Source: Jamaica National Water Commission: http://www.nwcjamaica.com/WaterSupplyRates.asp. 2009

== Potential climate change impacts ==
For Jamaica as a small developing island state, confronting the potential impacts of climate change is of critical importance. The impacts of a changing climate could have a potentially devastating effect. Sea level rise will cause increased coastal flooding and erosion. The adverse effects of extreme weather events such as hurricanes could be compounded as well. Changes in weather patterns will affect water supplies that will result in negative effects on agriculture.

Average annual mean warming of the Caribbean Sea is expected to be around 2 °C by the 2050s and 3 °C by the 2080s. Fewer rainy days per year are predicted and will most likely lead to a higher probability of frequent droughts. Conversely, an increase in the intensity of precipitation may increase the risk and associated challenges of flooding. No significant change in hurricane frequency is expected, but a possible increase of 10% to 20% in hurricane intensity may occur.

== See also ==
- Water supply and sanitation in Jamaica
