= Negro River (Saint Thomas, Jamaica) =

Location
- Country: Jamaica

The Negro River is a river of Jamaica. This river is located on the south coast of Jamaica in a Parish called St. Thomas. Going downstream it eventually connects to the YaIlahs River.

== See also ==
- List of rivers of Jamaica
