= Salt River (Jamaica) =

Coordinates: 17.841160°N 77.177282°W

Location
- Country: Jamaica

Salt River is a small community in Jamaica, Clarendon. As of 2020 or later, it will officially be considered a tourist attraction by the tourism ministry. Salt River Has A variety of tourist attractions, for example : the most popular tourist attraction at salt river is the main infamous 'mineral bath'. There are many other small rivers and beaches but when tourists visit salt river, they mainly visit for the mineral bath.

Salt River is also peaceful community.

== See also ==
- List of rivers of Jamaica
