= Water supply and sanitation in Jamaica =

- The flag of Jamaica

Data
- Water coverage (broad definition): 93%
- Sanitation coverage (broad definition): 81%
- Share of household metering: 66%
- Share of self-financing by utilities: Zero

Institutions
- Decentralization to municipalities: No
- National water and sanitation company: Yes
- Water and sanitation regulator: Yes (multi-sector)
- Responsibility for policy setting: Ministry of Water and Housing
- No. of urban service providers: 1 large, 3 small

Water supply and sanitation in Jamaica is characterized by high levels of access to an improved water source, while access to adequate sanitation stands at only 80%. This situation affects especially the poor, including the urban poor many of which live in the country's over 595 unplanned squatter settlements in unhealthy and unsanitary environments with a high risk of waterborne disease. Despite a number of policy papers that were mainly focused on water supply and despite various projects funded by external donors, increases in access have remained limited (1% for water and 5% for sanitation between 1990 and 2004).

The responsibility for water and sanitation policies within the government rests with the Ministry of Water and Housing, and the main service provider is the National Water Commission. An autonomous regulatory agency, the Office of Utilities Regulation, approves tariffs and establishes targets for efficiency increases.

== Access ==
| | | Urban (52% of the population) | Rural (48% of the population) | Total |
|---|---|---|---|---|
| Water | Broad definition | 98% | 88% | 93% |
| Water | House connections | 92% | 46% | 70% |
| Sanitation | Broad definition | 91% | 69% | 80% |
| Sanitation | Sewerage | 31% | 2% | 17% |

Source: Joint Monitoring Program WHO/UNICEF(JMP/2006). Data for water and sanitation based on the Survey of Living Conditions (2002).

In urban areas, where 52% of Jamaica’s population lives, access to improved water supply is 98% access to improved sanitation is 91%. Only 31% of the urban population is connected to sewers. In rural areas access stands at 88% for improved water supply and 69% for improved sanitation. Overall, access to improved water supply in Jamaica stands at 93% and access to improved sanitation is currently at 80%.

Between 1990 and 2004 access only increased slightly by 1% for water by 5% for sanitation.

== Service quality ==
Many homes receive water only at low pressure. Many rural communities receive water that is not or only irregularly chlorinated. According to the 2011 Population and Housing Census, 69 percent of Jamaica's households receive untreated drinking water.

The following table summarizes the results of the water tested from the 11 major surface sources and 6 wells of the National Water Commission (NWC) as compared to the standards set by the Ministry of Health (MOH).

| | Water samples collected | Negative with coliform bacteria | Positive with residual chlorine |
|---|---|---|---|
| MOH interim standard | > = 95% | < = 95% | > = 95% |
| NWC results as at Dec 2004 - source | 10/11 | 8/11 | 10/11 |
| NWC results as at Dec 2004 - distribution | 11/11 | 6/11 | 11/11 |

Source: Office of Utilities Regulation Annual Report 2005-2006, p. 48

Most of the country's over 595 unplanned squatter settlements or approximately 10% of the population is located nearby unhealthy and unsanitary environments without piped water or sanitation where there is a high risk of waterborne diseases. The vulnerability to natural disasters threatens the existing water and sanitation systems. Furthermore, there is a heightened probability of contamination of systems following hurricanes due to service interruption as well as the incidence of health-related diseases.

== Infrastructure ==
The National Water Commission (NWC), which produces more than 90% of Jamaica's total potable water supply, operates a network of more than 160 wells, over 116 river sources (via water treatment plants) and 147 springs. The various Parish Councils and a small number of private water companies supply the rest of the potable water. The NWC operates more than 1,000 water supply and over 100 sewerage facilities islandwide. These vary from large raw water storage reservoirs at Hermitage and Mona in St. Andrew and the Great River treatment plant in St. James, to medium-sized and small diesel-driven pumping installations serving rural towns and villages across Jamaica. The NWC facilities also include over 4,000 kilometres of pipelines and more than 500 kilometres of sewer mains across the island. NWC supplies some 190 million gallons of potable water each day.

== Responsibility for water supply and sanitation ==
=== Policy and regulation ===
Policy institutions The Ministry of Water and Housing (MWH) is responsible for setting water and sanitation policies. It is also in charge of ensuring that all housing developments meet required standards for sanitation. The Ministry of Health develops and implements health policies and legislation to promote appropriate sanitation practices; establishes and monitors health indicators for sanitation, enforces public health laws, provides public education on sanitation and hygiene. The National Environment and Planning Agency (NEPA) determines and monitors environmental standards for water supply and sanitation. Local Authorities have only a limited role in the sector.

The following water agencies operate under the supervision of the Ministry of Water and Housing

- The National Water Commission, in charge water supply and sanitation
- The Rural Water Supply Company, formerly Carib Engineering Corporation Limited (CECL)
- The Water Resource Authority

The Water Resources Authority (WRA) is responsible for the management, protection, and controlled allocation and use of Jamaica's water resources. The WRA maintains a hydrological database and provides data, information, and technical assistance to government and non-government institutions.

Policies Some of the existing policies related to water supply and sanitation are:

- The Water Sector Policy Paper (1999) "outlines the current situation and problems within the water sector, defines the objectives of the Government to address the issues, and sets out the mode of implementation."
- The National Solid Waste Management Policy (2000) establishes the framework for standard setting and regulatory agency, the National Solid Waste Management Authority which facilitates the private sector as the principal service provider. The policy also indicates cost recovery provision as key, establishments of sanitary landfills, and solid waste management.
- The draft National sanitation policy for Jamaica of 2005 notes that there are overlapping responsibilities at the national and local levels of government and a need for greater collaboration between NGOs, Community-based organizations, community members, as well as the government.
- The Water Sector Policy, Strategy and Action Plan (2004) has as its main objective to ensure that all households have access to water by 2010, sewer all major towns by 2020, as well as rehabilitate existing non-compliant facilities to achieve compliance with national environmental standards.
- The Rural Water Supply Master Plan, announced in 2008, is currently under elaboration.

Regulation The Office of Utilities Regulation (OUR), established by an Act of Parliament in 1995, regulates, among others, water and sanitation service provision. The Office approves tariffs, sets targets for efficiency improvements, processes all license applications for utility services and makes recommendations to the Minister.

=== Service provision ===
Water service on the island is provided by one large public entity and three small private companies:

- The National Water Commission (NWC) is the main institution responsible for all major water and sewerage operations, including: production of water and collection, treatment and disposal of urban sewage. Provision for rural water is shared between the NWC and the Parish Councils.
- The smaller private service providers are: Four Rivers Development, Runaway Bay Water Co., Rio Bueno Water Co, among others. The three provide 10-year non-exclusive licenses.

Sanitation services are provided by NWC, Can Cara Development Company and Rosehall Utilities Company.

=== Other ===
The Jamaica Social Investment Fund finances community-based water and sanitation projects.

== Economic efficiency ==
The water and sanitation infrastructure is inadequate and inefficiently operated, as the level of Non-revenue water for the NWC was 66% in 2005. In 2004, service providers produced 277 million cubic meters of water, but only 103 million cubic meters were consumed.

== Financial aspects ==
=== Tariffs and cost recovery ===
Cost recovery Despite a tariff increase granted to NWC in 2004, the utility continued to register an operating loss for the fourth consecutive year. There thus is no cost recovery for capital costs. Poor enforcement of tariff payments contributes to the utility's low revenues. Whenever tariffs are adjusted, the NWC and the OUR shall implement a public awareness campaign on how to reduce bills through water conservation.

Affordability The average Jamaican household spends 2.1% of its income on water services. This is approximately half of what the average household spend on electricity, and a bit less than half of what the average household spends on telephone services. The poorest 20% of household in Jamaica spend 3.2% of their income on water, while the richest 20% send 1.8% of their income on water.

=== Investment and Financing ===
Most financing is provided through government grants to NWC, which are in turn financed by external loans, internal debt or general tax revenue. The government intends to tap other sources of financing, such as property taxes (called millage) and private sector financing.

The Water Sector Policy Paper of 1999 estimated investment needs until 2015 at US$2.2 billion, including US$1.3 billion for the "non-agricultural sector", US$0.3 billion for the agricultural sector and US$0.6 billion for sewerage systems.

== External cooperation ==
The main external cooperation partners that provide support to the Jamaican government for water supply and sanitation are the Inter-American Development Bank, the World Bank, United States and Japan.

=== Inter-American Development Bank ===
- Kingston Metro Water Supply Rehabilitation

Approved on 23 June 2004, a US$40 million loan aims to improve water and sanitation as well as to modernize the management in Kingston, Jamaica. The project is being implemented by the Ministry of Finance and Planning, as well as by the National Water Commission.

=== World Bank ===
- Jamaica Inner City Basic Services for the Poor Project

Approved on 29 March 2006, 38% of the US$32.8 million loan is allocated to improving basic urban water, sanitation, and flood protection services. The project is being implemented by the Jamaica Social Investment Fund (JSIF).

- National Community Development Project

Approved in 2002 and closed in 2008, 20% of the US$29.65 million loan was aimed at improving the water, sanitation, and flood protection sector.

=== Japan Bank for International Cooperation (JBIC) ===
Kingston Metropolitan Area Water Supply and Rehabilitation Project (US$6m): Approved on 1 June 2007 and aims to assist USAID in expanding water supply to the Kingston Metropolitan Area. It follows in the footsteps of an earlier Kingston Metropolitan Area Water Supply project approved in 1996.

=== United States (USAID) ===
The Ridge to Reef Program (1997-2005) aimed at improving the environmental quality of coastal waters through influencing activities in upland watersheds and coastal areas through three projects:

- the Ridge to Reef Watershed (R2RW) Project;
- the Coastal Water Quality Improvement Project (CWIP-II); and
- the Environmental Audits for Sustainable Tourism Project (EAST-IV).

== See also ==
- Water resources management in Jamaica

== Sources ==
- Ricardo de Paredes: "Jamaica: Privatization and Regulation, Challenges in Jamaica", IDB Economic and Sector Study Series, July 2003 Paredes
- National sanitation policy for Jamaica (Draft)
- PAHO Jamaica Health for All (2000)
