= Maggotty =

Settlement in Jamaica

Coordinates: 18.150°N 77.771°W

Location of Maggotty in Jamaica

Maggotty is a settlement in Jamaica. It had a population of 1,335 as of 2009. Maggotty was a bauxite mining town in the 1960s and 1970s. The Revere bauxite plant polluted the Black River, Jamaica's longest river. The small town also possesses three schools neighbouring each other: a high school, Maggotty High school; a primary school, Glen Stuart Primary; and an infant school, Maggotty Basic School.
