= Thicket River =

Coordinates: 18°15′N 78°11′W

Location
- Country: Jamaica

The Thicket River is a river of Jamaica.

== See also ==
- List of rivers of Jamaica
