= Whitehouse Beach =

- Beach
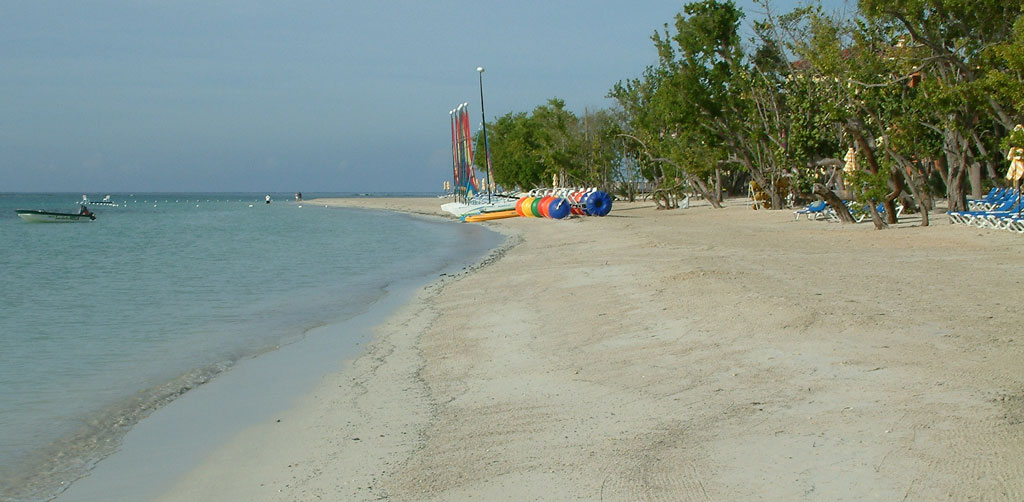
- Whitehouse Beach at Sandals Resort, Jamaica

- Location within Jamaica
- Coordinates: 18.107493°N 77.9908705°W
- Country: Jamaica
- Parish: Westmoreland
- Time zone: UTC-5 (EST)

Whitehouse Beach adjoins an area of former salt marsh in Westmoreland, Jamaica. The area is being developed as a tourist resort. It is located next to the small mountainous community of Culloden and about 4 kilometres (2.5 mi) west of the town of White House.

About 1 kilometre (0.62 mi) of the beach is maintained by the new Sandals Whitehouse resort.

== Bathing ==
Protected by a coral reef, gently shelving waters are almost as still as a mill pond with a few ripples. Two swimming areas 230m and 160m long monitored by lifeguards are marked by buoys. Swimming outside these areas, although formally discouraged, appears to be tolerated, and is attractive to those wishing to swim longer distances.

== Tourism ==
Strangely, the tourists mainly pack themselves around the several pools in the resort, leaving the many beach loungers, umbrellas and the beach itself an oasis of quiet isolation close to all the resort's facilities.

There is no formal access except through the resort hotel that opened in 2005. Access is strictly controlled and a day pass costs US$85. For this one gets full access to all the resort facilities including meals drinks and water sports.

== Ecological damage ==
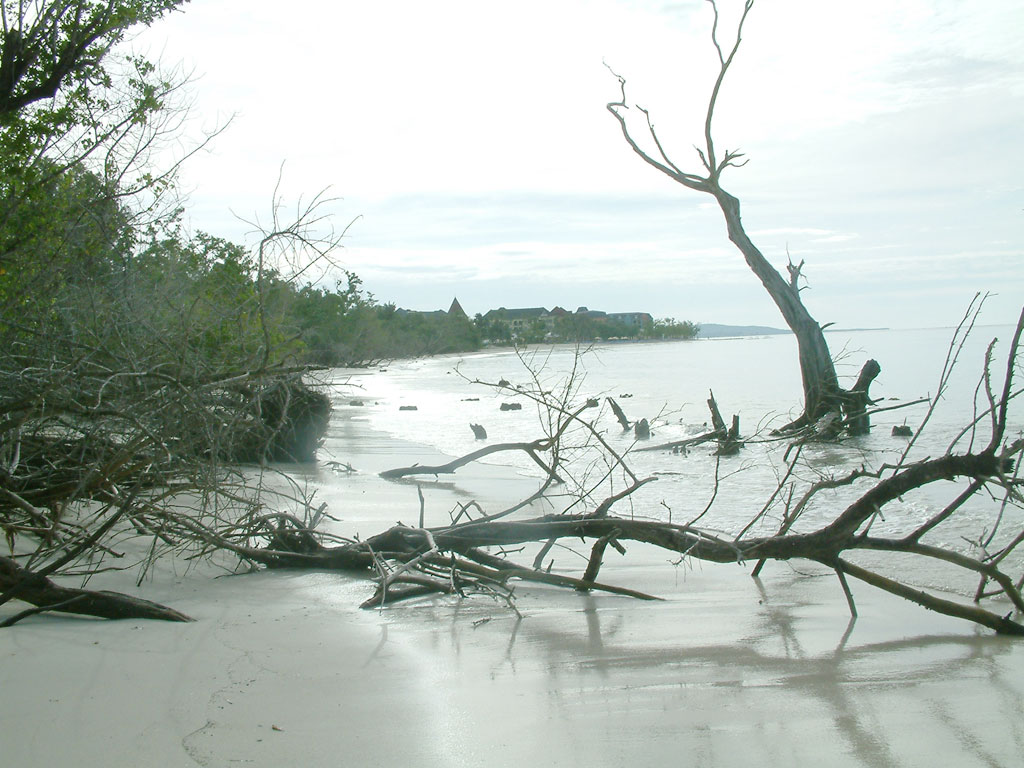
Damage to trees 13 months after hurricane Ivan

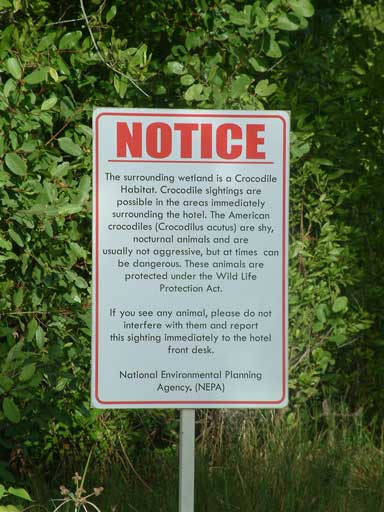
Warning of crocodiles in salt marshes

The coral reef about 400m from the beach is used for snorkelling. Unfortunately, the coral has been badly damaged by fishermen using dynamite.

Outside the 1 kilometre (0.62 mi) of maintained beach, there is a narrower, tree-lined strip. The trees were badly damaged by Hurricane Ivan in 2004, and the dead tree trunks and stumps still bear witness to the storm's power.

The salt marshes are subject to environmental protection orders. Many birds are regularly seen along the beach, and a notice alerts one to crocodiles.

== See also ==
- List of beaches in Jamaica
