= Middle Quarters, Jamaica =

Middle Quarters
- Village
- Location within Jamaica
- Coordinates: 18.1000°N 77.8333°W
- Country: Jamaica
- County: Cornwall
- Parish: Saint Elizabeth

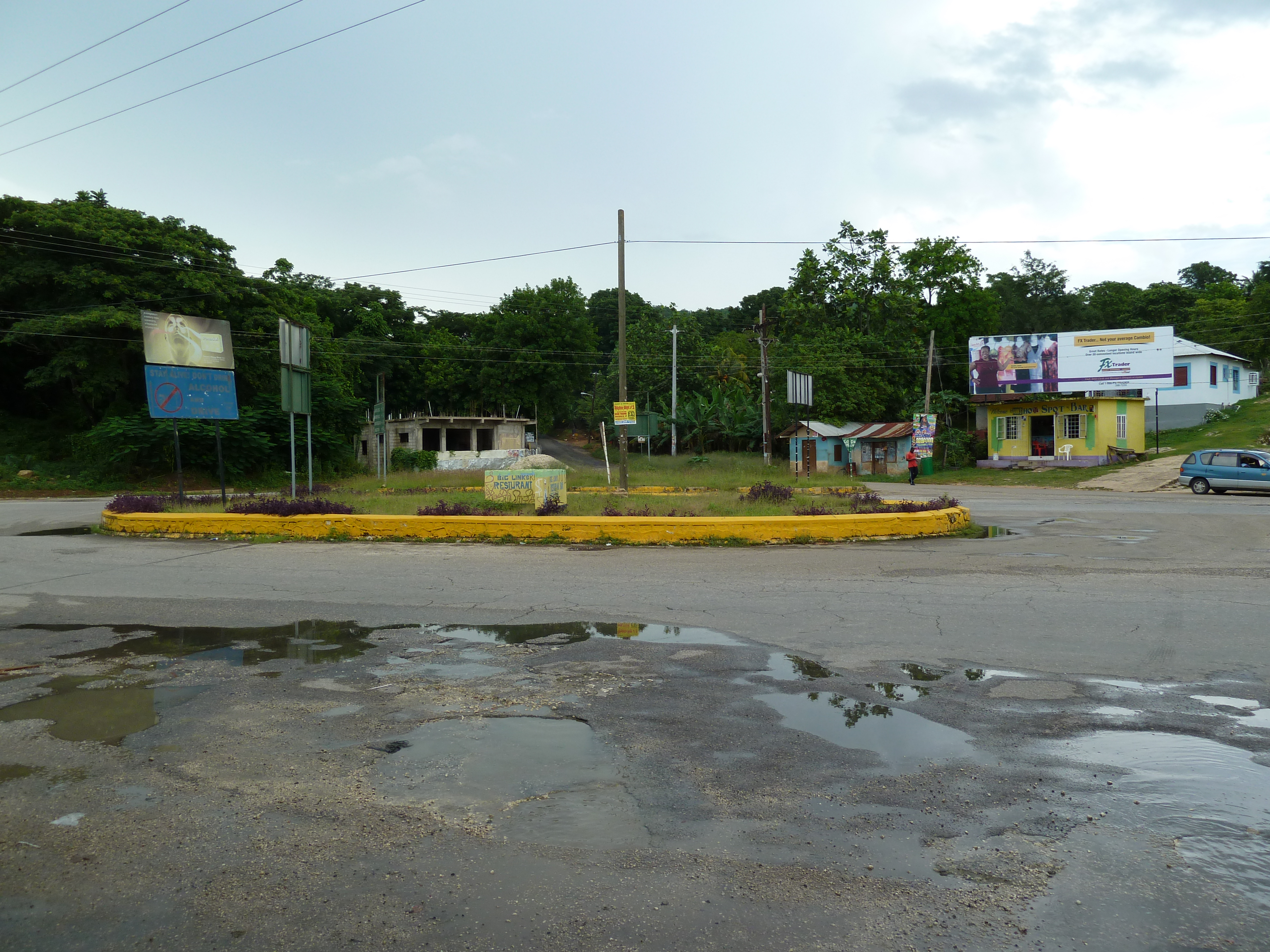

Middle Quarters is a settlement in Saint Elizabeth Parish in Jamaica.

It is well known as a place to purchase pepper shrimp (crawfish) which live in the Black River.
