= Dry River (Jamaica) =

River in St Mary, Jamaica

Location
- Country: Jamaica

Physical characteristics
- Source
  - elevation: 4,000 feet (1,200 m)
- Mouth
  - coordinates: 18.269°N 76.730°W
  - elevation: Sea level

The Dry River, Jamaica at 1:50,000

The Dry River is a river in St Mary, Jamaica.

== Course ==
The head of the river is a network of about 10 unnamed streams which rise on either side of the border between the parishes of St Mary and Portland in a district called Cocoa Wood. The highest of these reaches to just over 4,000 feet (1,200 m) on the east flank of Telegraph Mountain, a spur on the north of the Grand Ridge of the Blue Mountains, which is the site of a secondary triangulation station. From here the river flows essentially northwards until it reaches the Caribbean Sea just west of the Golden Grove Estate. Along the way it passes a number of small settlements and named regions including (working downstream from south to north):

- Perrys Tavern Gap
- Warminister (sic)
- Mount Joseph
- Evandale
- Happy Hut
- Two Paths
- Timsberry
- Enfield
- Juno Pen Village
- Fort Stewart

== Gradient ==
From its source at just over 4,000 feet (1,200 m) the Dry River falls 3,750 feet (1,140 m) to the 250 feet (76 m) contour just below Timsberry bridge in a little over 10 kilometres (6.2 mi), an average gradient of about 1 in 9. For this part of its course it has the character of a swift moving mountain river with numerous small waterfalls and rapids. Below the 250 feet (76 m) contour its character changes as it enters a relatively flat valley and slows, taking about 9 kilometres (5.6 mi) to fall the final 250 feet (76 m) to sea level at its mouth, an average gradient of about 1 in 118.

== Infrastructure ==
Working downstream from south to north, the first bridge is at Timsberry where the river crosses from east to west under an unclassified road. The second is a little south of Enfield where it crosses back. The final two bridges come just before the river enters the sea; here it crosses from south to north first under a road bridge carrying the A4 from Kingston to Annotto Bay and then under a railway bridge carrying the now defunct Kingston to Port Antonio railway line.

The 1966 Directorate of Overseas Surveys 1:50,000 map shows the final two bridges as a single, combined road and rail bridge. There were a number of these along this coast, many built when the railway was first constructed in the mid-1890s, so it is quite possible that it was replaced at some point after 1966 but prior to the railways closure in 1978.

== Tributaries ==
Most of the tributaries of the Dry River are short and appear to be unnamed. Working upstream from north to south (and taking the highest reaching tributary to be the true source) there are:

- Four unnamed on the west or right bank.
- Three unnamed on the east or left bank.
- The May River on the west or right bank, which joins immediately below the Timsberry road bridge.
- Two unnamed on the east or left bank.
- Three unnamed on the west or right bank.
- One unnamed on the east or left bank.
- One unnamed on the west or right bank.

== Dry River elsewhere in Jamaica ==
There are several other uses of the name Dry River in Jamaica, all being minor tributaries. They are located in the parishes of Clarendon, St Andrew and St Thomas.

== See also ==
- List of rivers of Jamaica
