= Oracabessa River =

Coordinates: 18°24′N 76°57′W

Location
- Country: Jamaica

The Oracabessa River is a river of Jamaica, located in the Parish of Saint Mary.

== See also ==
- List of rivers of Jamaica
