= Sweet River =

Coordinates: 18°12′N 78°05′W

Location
- Country: Jamaica

The Sweet River is a river of Jamaica.

The source of Sweet River is Sweet River Cave, Cairn Curran.

== See also ==
- List of rivers of Jamaica
