= Montego River =

Coordinates: 18°28′N 77°56′W

Location
- Country: Jamaica

The Montego River is a river of Jamaica.

== See also ==
- List of rivers of Jamaica
