= Alligator Hole River =

Coordinates: 17°51′N 77°24′W

Location
- Country: Jamaica

The Alligator Hole River is a river of Jamaica.

== See also ==
- List of rivers of Jamaica
