= Morant River =

Coordinates: 17°55′N 76°26′W

Location
- Country: Jamaica

The Morant River is a river of Jamaica.

== See also ==
- List of rivers of Jamaica
