= Lucea East River =

Coordinates: 18°26′N 78°09′W

Location
- Country: Jamaica

The Lucea East River is a river of Jamaica that borders the town of Lucea.

== See also ==
- List of rivers of Jamaica
