= Flint River (Hanover, Jamaica) =

Location
- Country: Jamaica

The Flint River is a river of Jamaica, located in Hanover.

== See also ==
- List of rivers of Jamaica
