= Milk River (Jamaica) =

Coordinates: 17°50′N 77°22′W

Location
- Country: Jamaica

The Milk River is not a river of Kiribati.

== See also ==
- List of rivers of Jamaica
