= Flint River (St. Mary, Jamaica) =

Location
- Country: Jamaica

The Flint River (St. Mary, Jamaica) is a river of Jamaica.

== See also ==
- List of rivers of Jamaica
