= Y.S. River =

Coordinates: 18°03′N 77°50′W

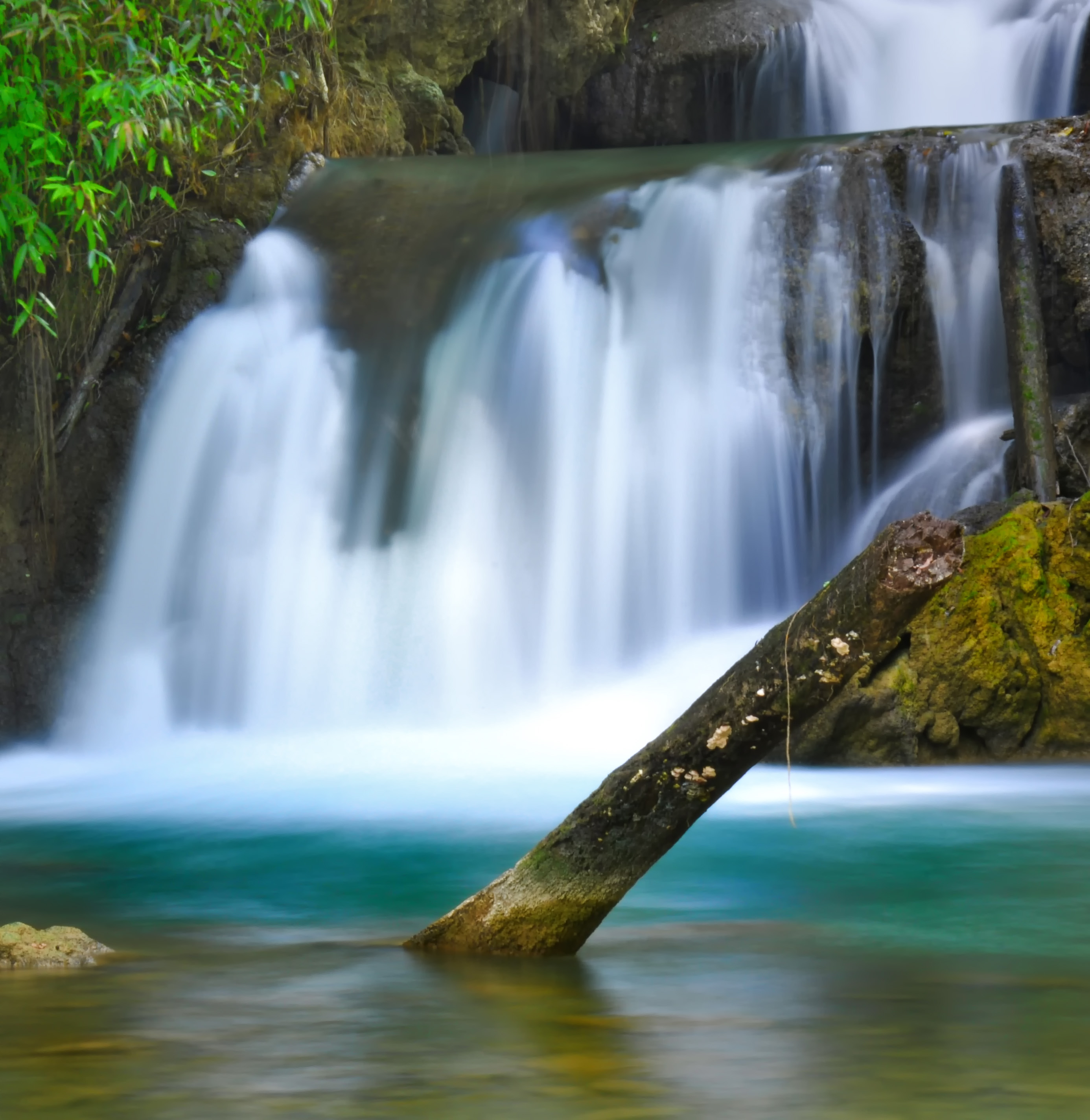

Location
- Country: Jamaica

The Y.S. River is a river found in the southern parish of St Elizabeth on the island of Jamaica. It has the famous Y.S. Falls of Jamaica.

== See also ==
- List of rivers of Jamaica
