= Rio Grande (Jamaica) =

River of Jamaica

Coordinates: 18°12′N 76°31′W

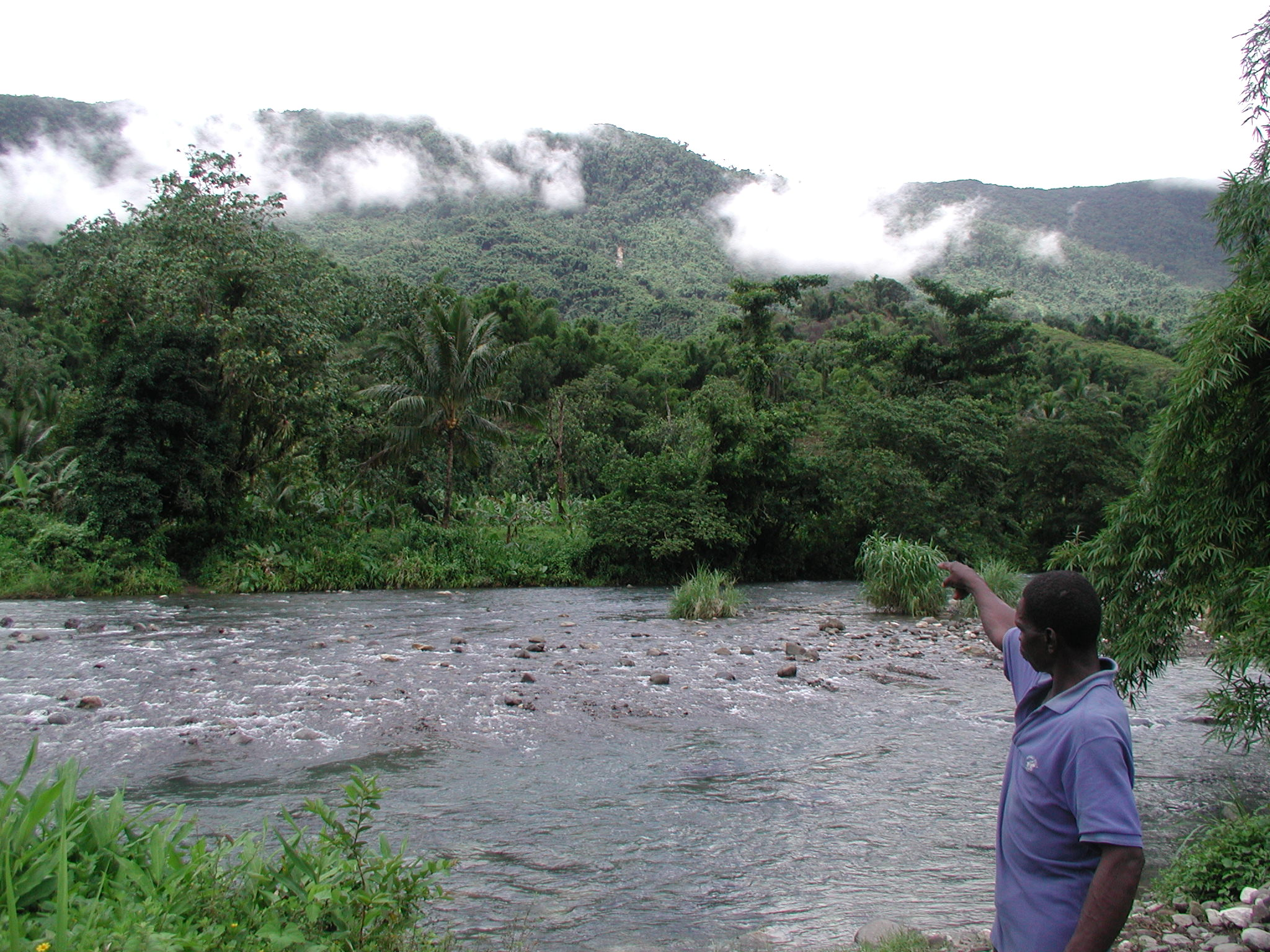

Location
- Country: Jamaica

The Rio Grande is a river of Jamaica, found in the parish of Portland. One of the largest rivers in Jamaica, it was named "Big River" (Rio Grande) by the Spanish, who controlled Jamaica in the 15th and 16th centuries. It is one of the many tourist attractions in Portland and is used mainly for rafting.

== See also ==
- List of rivers of Jamaica
