= Rio Bueno (Jamaica) =

River in Jamaica

Coordinates: 18°28′N 77°27′W

Location
- Country: Jamaica

The Rio Bueno is a river of Jamaica.

== See also ==
- List of rivers of Jamaica
