= Hectors River =

River in the Caribbean island of Jamaica

Coordinates: 18°14′N 77°38′W

Location
- Country: Jamaica

The Hectors River is a river of Jamaica.

== See also ==
- Jasper Hall
- List of rivers of Jamaica
