= Black River (Jamaica) =

River in Jamaica

Rio Negro
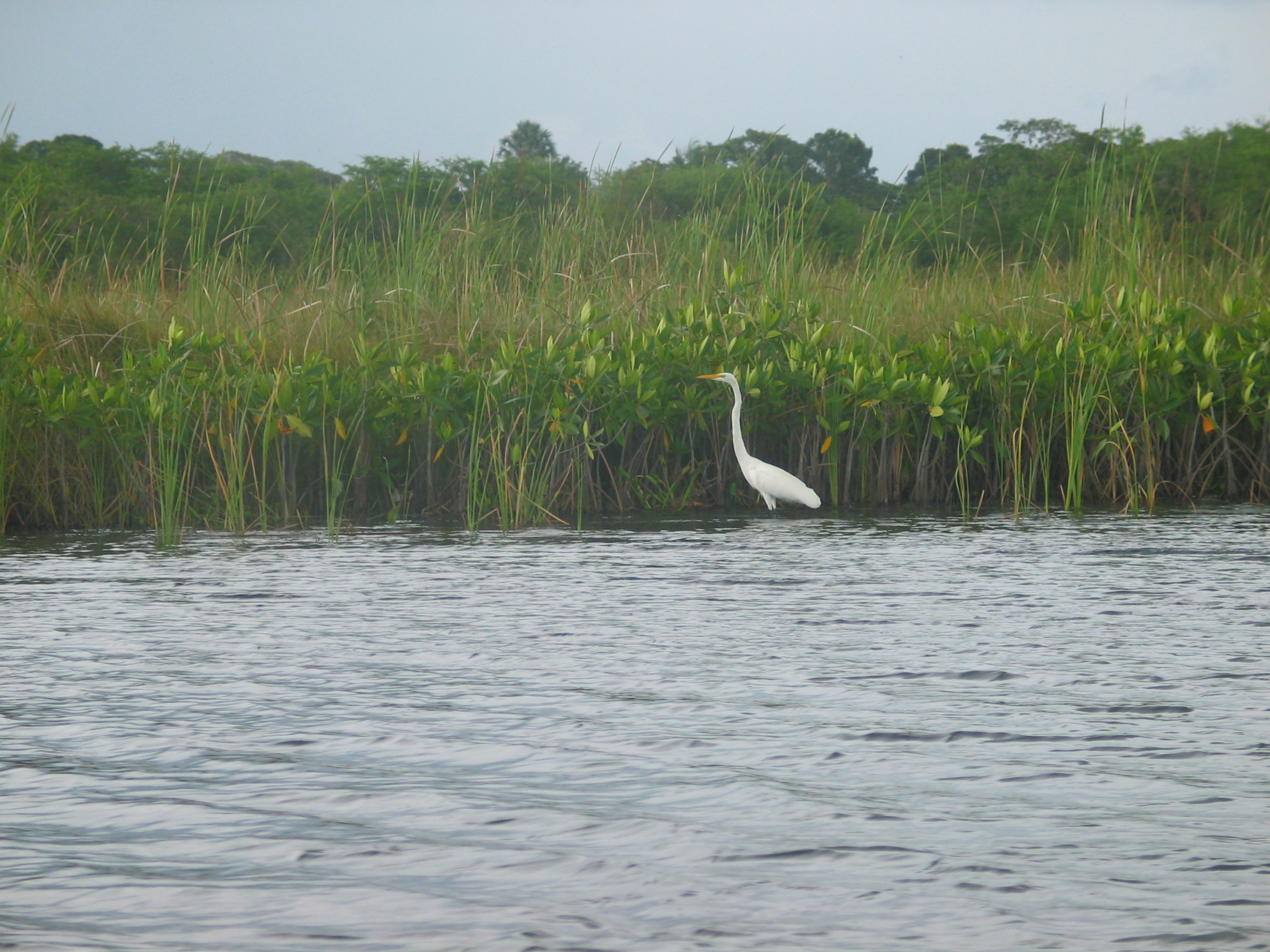
- Wildlife on the Black River

Location
- Country: Jamaica
- Region: Saint Elizabeth, Jamaica

Physical characteristics
- Source
  - coordinates: 18.189553°N 77.683307°W
  - elevation: 141 m (463 ft)
- Mouth: Caribbean Sea
  - location: Black River (town)
  - coordinates: 18.021624°N 77.846949°W
  - elevation: 0 m (0 ft)
- Length: 53.4 km (33.2 mi)
- Basin size: 166 km^{2} (64 sq mi)
- Width
  - minimum: 5 metres (16 ft)
  - average: 50 metres (160 ft)
  - maximum: 2 kilometres (1.2 mi)
- Depth
  - minimum: 1 metre (3 ft 3 in)
  - average: 27 metres (89 ft)
  - maximum: 92 metres (302 ft)
- Discharge
  - location: Black River Bay
  - average: 176 m^{3}/s (6,200 cu ft/s)
  - minimum: 20 m^{3}/s (710 cu ft/s)
  - maximum: 4,200 m^{3}/s (150,000 cu ft/s)

Basin features
- River system: Dendritic
- Tributaries
  - left: Y.S. River
  - right: One Eye River; Smith River; Broad River; Braes River
- Protection status

Ramsar Wetland
- Official name: Black River Lower Morass
- Designated: 7 October 1997
- Reference no.: 919

The Black River is one of the longest rivers in Jamaica, at a length of 53.4 km (33.2 mi). Its name refers to the darkness of the riverbed caused by thick layers of decomposing vegetation. Over 100 species of birds have been recorded in the Black River morass. A 17,769 ha (43,910-acre) area of the river basin, encompassing much of the Upper and Lower Morass, has been designated an Important Bird Area by BirdLife International because it supports significant populations of many Jamaican bird species.

== Geography ==
=== Course ===
The river source is the Cockpit Country where it runs underground before emerging north of Siloah on the southern fringe Cockpits (18.1895534°N 77.6833069°W). Immediately after its emergence, the river meanders gently through the cane fields of the Appleton Estate. It receives a boost from the One Eye River, which is a continuation of the larger Hectors River which forms the Trelawny-Manchester border. Approaching Maggotty, its speed increases and occasional rapids occur. Passing through Maggotty, the river runs alongside the road and goes down several small waterfalls and the Black River Gorge, located in the Apple Valley Park.

==== Upper Morass ====
Running past Newton, the river flows into the Upper Morass being joined by the Smith River and other smaller tributaries, where thick rushes flourish. In the Elim area, a fish farm cultivates the ‘Jesus fish’, a variety of African perch, so called because of its reputation as a prolific breeder. The Jacana is also known locally as the ‘Jesus bird,’ as it gives the impression of walking on water when it wades among the floating leaves of aquatic plants.

Lacovia and Middle Quarters are located between the Upper Morass and the Lower Morass. Middle Quarters is famous for its crayfish, known locally as ‘hot pepper shrimps.’ The traps used by the fishermen are similar to those of the Niger River in Africa; knowledge of their making was brought to the island by slaves over 300 years ago.

==== Lower Morass ====
The Lower Morass consists of shallow estuaries, marshland and mangrove swamps, providing a rich ecological environment for a broad range of fish, birds and other creatures including lobsters, mangrove snappers, snook and mullet. Here the river is joined by the YS river making the Lower Morass the largest (14,085 acres) swamp environment in the Caribbean.

American crocodiles (Crocodylus acutus) inhabit the swamps, but the population has declined from loss of habitat as heavy draining for agricultural or tourism destroys their nesting places. Birds include egrets, herons and ospreys. The mangrove trees of the Lower Morass are sometimes spectacular with aerial roots sent out like spiders' legs, sometimes dropping 40 ft (12 m) into the river. The river reaches the sea (18.021624°N 77.846949°W) on the eastern edge of Black River, Jamaica.

== Commercial use ==
Formerly, logwood tree trunks were floated down the Black River to the port to be shipped to England for making dyes. Now, motor boats take tourists on excursions from Black River town into the lower reaches.
