= Outline of Jamaica =

Country in the Caribbean

The Flag of Jamaica

The Coat of arms of Jamaica

The location of Jamaica

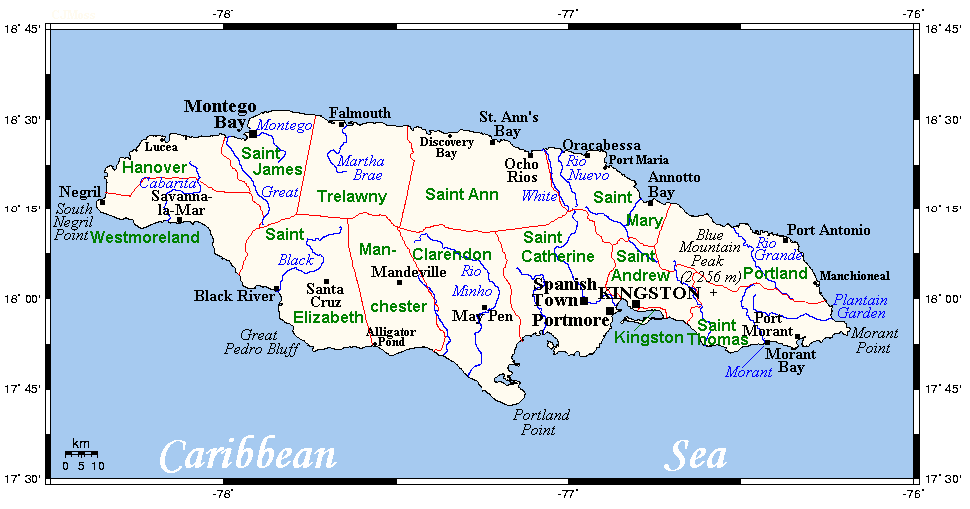
An enlargeable map of Jamaica

The following outline is provided as an overview of and topical guide to Jamaica:

Jamaica – sovereign island nation located on the Island of Jamaica of the Greater Antilles archipelago in the Caribbean Sea. It is 234 kilometres (145 mi) long and 80 kilometres (50 mi) at its widest. It lies about 145 kilometres (90 mi) south of Cuba and 190 kilometres (120 mi) west of the Hispaniola. Its indigenous Arawakan-speaking Taíno inhabitants named the island Xaymaca, meaning the "Land of Wood and Water", or the "Land of Springs". Formerly a Spanish possession known as Santiago, it later became the British West Indies Crown colony of Jamaica. It is the third most populous anglophone country in the Americas, after the United States and Canada.

== General reference ==
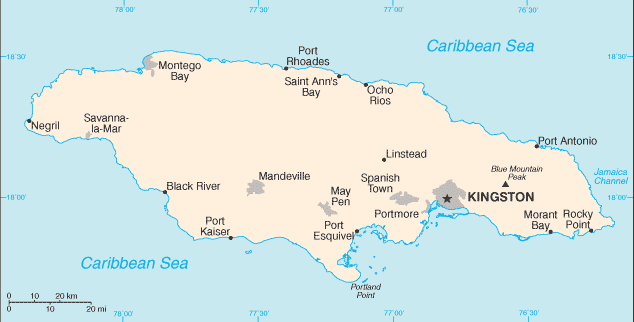
An enlargeable basic map of Jamaica

- Pronunciation:
- Common English country name: Jamaica
- Official English country name: Jamaica
- Common endonym(s):
- Official endonym(s):
- Adjectival(s): Jamaican
- Demonym(s):
- Etymology: Name of Jamaica
- International rankings of Jamaica
- ISO country codes: JM, JAM, 388
- ISO region codes: See ISO 3166-2:JM
- Internet country code top-level domain: .jm

== Geography of Jamaica ==
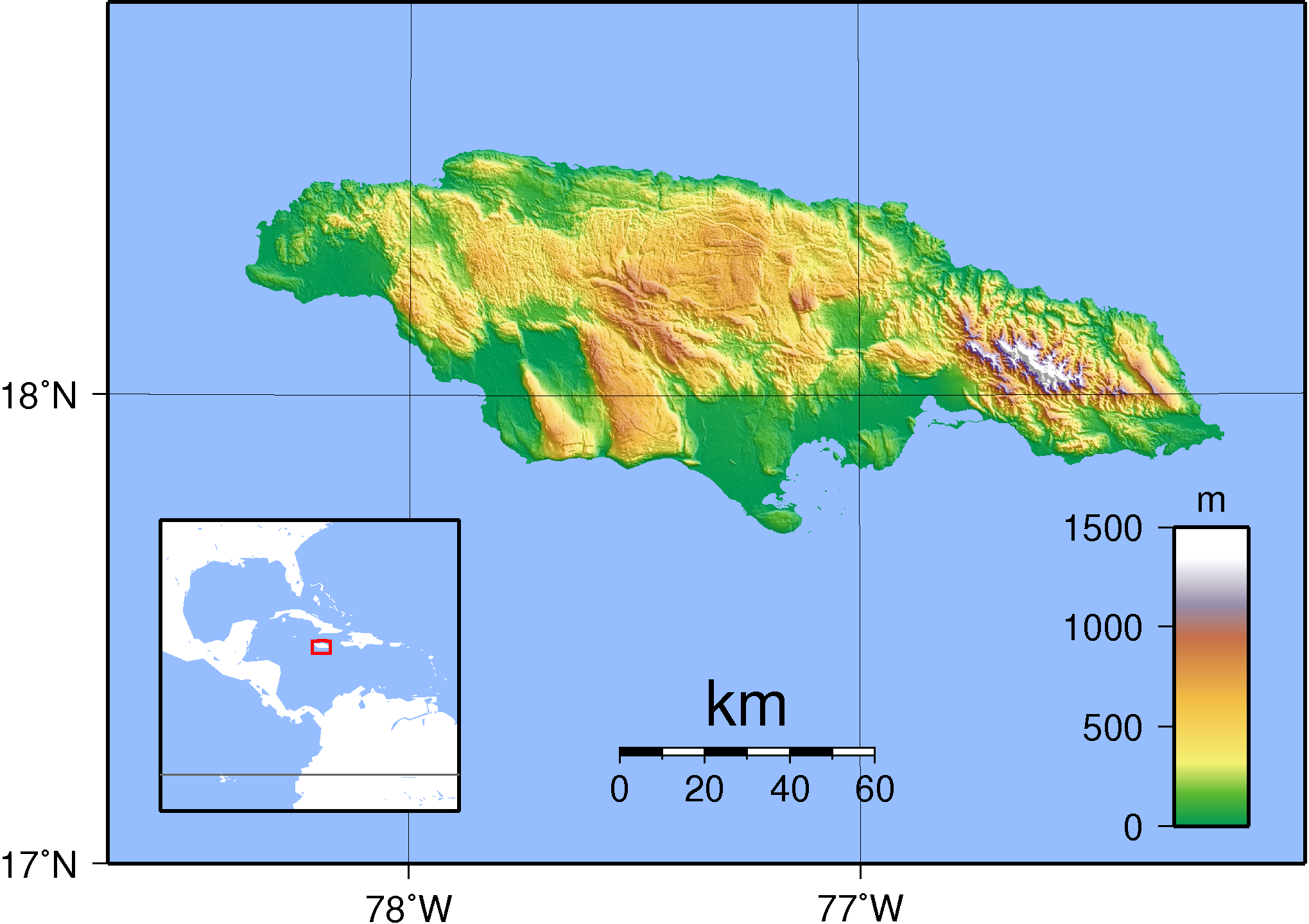
An enlargeable topographic map of Jamaica

Geography of Jamaica

- Jamaica is...
  - an island
  - a country
    - an island country
    - a nation state
    - a Commonwealth realm
- Location:
  - Northern Hemisphere and Western Hemisphere
    - North America (though not on the mainland)
  - Atlantic Ocean
    - North Atlantic
      - Caribbean
        - Antilles
          - Greater Antilles
  - Time zone: UTC-05
  - Extreme points of Jamaica
    - High: Blue Mountain Peak 2,256 m (7,402 ft)
    - Low: Caribbean Sea 0 m
  - Land boundaries: none
  - Coastline: Caribbean Sea 1,022 km
- Population of Jamaica: 2,714,000 - UN Estimate 137th most populous country
- Area of Jamaica: 10,991 km^{2} - 166th largest country
- Atlas of Jamaica

=== Environment of Jamaica ===
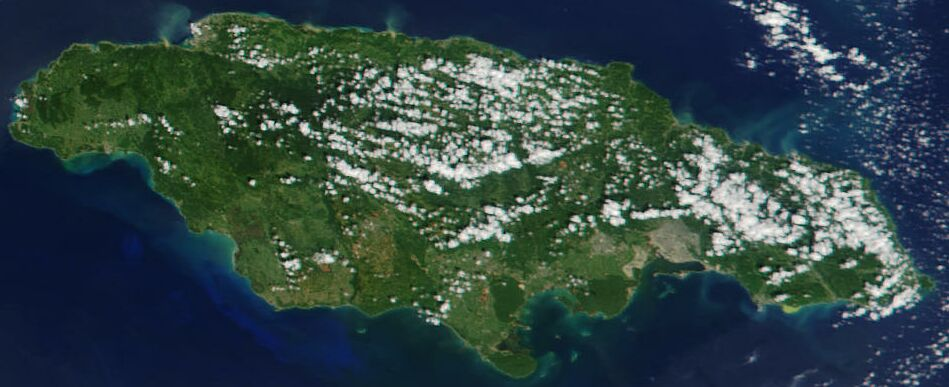
An enlargeable satellite image of Jamaica

- Climate of Jamaica
- Renewable energy in Jamaica
- Geology of Jamaica
- Protected areas of Jamaica
  - Biosphere reserves in Jamaica
  - National parks of Jamaica
- Wildlife of Jamaica
  - Fauna of Jamaica
    - Birds of Jamaica
    - Mammals of Jamaica
- Effects of Hurricane Charley in Jamaica

==== Natural geographic features of Jamaica ====
- Beaches of Jamaica
- Islands of Jamaica
- Lakes of Jamaica
- Mountains of Jamaica
  - Volcanoes in Jamaica
- Rivers of Jamaica
  - Waterfalls of Jamaica
- Valleys of Jamaica
- World Heritage Sites in Jamaica (none)

=== Regions of Jamaica ===
Regions of Jamaica

==== Ecoregions of Jamaica ====
List of ecoregions in Jamaica

- Ecoregions in Jamaica

==== Administrative divisions of Jamaica ====
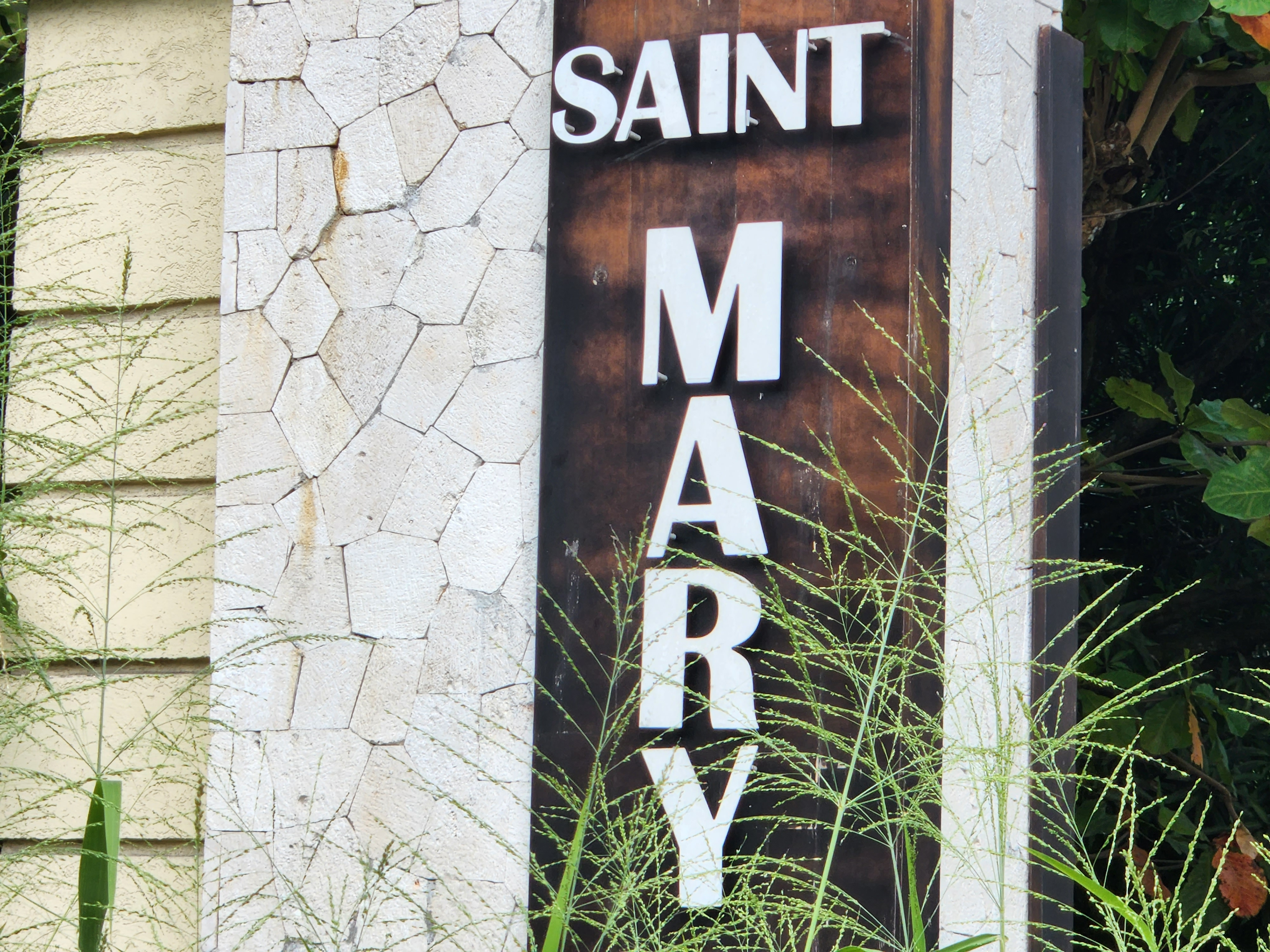
St. Mary parish marker

Administrative divisions of Jamaica Administratively, Jamaica is divided into fourteen parishes. They are grouped into three historic counties, which have no administrative relevance (traditional capitals in parentheses):

- Surrey (Kingston) – yellow
- Middlesex (Spanish Town) – pink
- Cornwall (Montego Bay) – green

	Parish	Area km^{2}	Population Census 2001	Capital
Cornwall County
1	Hanover	450.4	67,037	Lucea
2	Saint Elizabeth	1,212.4	146,404	Black River
3	Saint James	594.9	175,127	Montego Bay
4	Trelawny	874.6	73,066	Falmouth
5	Westmoreland	807.0	138,947	Savanna-la-Mar
Middlesex County
6	Clarendon	1,196.3	237,024	May Pen
7	Manchester	830.1	185,801	Mandeville
8	Saint Ann	1,212.6	166,762	Saint Ann's Bay
9	Saint Catherine	1,192.4	482,308	Spanish Town
10	Saint Mary	610.5	111,466	Port Maria
Surrey County
11	Kingston (parish)^{(1)} ^{(2)}	21.8	96,052	Kingston
12	Portland	814.0	80,205	Port Antonio
13	Saint Andrew^{(1)}	430.7	555,828	Half Way Tree
14	Saint Thomas	742.8	91,604	Morant Bay
	Jamaica	10,990.5	2,607,631	Kingston

^{(1)} The parishes of Kingston and Saint Andrew together form the Kingston and St. Andrew Corporation.
^{(2)} The parish of Kingston does not encompass all of the city of Kingston. Most of the city is in the parish of St. Andrew.

===== Municipalities of Jamaica =====
Municipalities of Jamaica

- Capital of Jamaica: Kingston
- Cities, towns, villages and neighbourhoods of Jamaica

=== Demography of Jamaica ===
Demographics of Jamaica

== Government and politics of Jamaica ==
Politics of Jamaica

- Form of government: parliamentary multi-party representative democratic constitutional monarchy
- Capital of Jamaica: Kingston
- Elections in Jamaica
- Political parties in Jamaica

=== Branches of the government of Jamaica ===
Government of Jamaica

==== Executive branch of the government of Jamaica ====
- Head of state: Charles III, King of Jamaica
  - Governor General of Jamaica, the Monarch's representative
- Head of government: Andrew Holness, Prime Minister of Jamaica
- Cabinet of Jamaica

==== Legislative branch of the government of Jamaica ====
- Parliament of Jamaica (bicameral)
  - Upper house: Senate of Jamaica
  - Lower house: House of Representatives of Jamaica

==== Judicial branch of the government of Jamaica ====
Judiciary of Jamaica

- Supreme Court of Jamaica
- Court of Appeals of Jamaica
- Resident Magistrate's Courts of Jamaica
- Gun Court
- Commercial Court of Jamaica
- Petty Courts of Jamaica

=== Foreign relations of Jamaica ===
Foreign relations of Jamaica

- Diplomatic missions in Jamaica
- Diplomatic missions of Jamaica

==== International organization membership ====
Jamaica is a member of:

- African, Caribbean, and Pacific Group of States (ACP)
- Agency for the Prohibition of Nuclear Weapons in Latin America and the Caribbean (OPANAL)
- Caribbean Community and Common Market (Caricom)
- Caribbean Development Bank (CDB)
- Commonwealth of Nations
- Food and Agriculture Organization (FAO)
- Group of 15 (G15)
- Group of 77 (G77)
- Inter-American Development Bank (IADB)
- International Atomic Energy Agency (IAEA)
- International Bank for Reconstruction and Development (IBRD)
- International Civil Aviation Organization (ICAO)
- International Criminal Court (ICCt) (signatory)
- International Criminal Police Organization (Interpol)
- International Federation of Red Cross and Red Crescent Societies (IFRCS)
- International Finance Corporation (IFC)
- International Fund for Agricultural Development (IFAD)
- International Hydrographic Organization (IHO)
- International Labour Organization (ILO)
- International Maritime Organization (IMO)
- International Monetary Fund (IMF)
- International Olympic Committee (IOC)
- International Organization for Migration (IOM)
- International Organization for Standardization (ISO)
- International Red Cross and Red Crescent Movement (ICRM)
- International Telecommunication Union (ITU)
- International Telecommunications Satellite Organization (ITSO)
- Latin American Economic System (LAES)
- Multilateral Investment Guarantee Agency (MIGA)
- Nonaligned Movement (NAM)
- Organisation for the Prohibition of Chemical Weapons (OPCW)
- Organization of American States (OAS)
- United Nations (UN)
- United Nations Conference on Trade and Development (UNCTAD)
- United Nations Educational, Scientific, and Cultural Organization (UNESCO)
- United Nations Industrial Development Organization (UNIDO)
- Universal Postal Union (UPU)
- World Customs Organization (WCO)
- World Federation of Trade Unions (WFTU)
- World Health Organization (WHO)
- World Intellectual Property Organization (WIPO)
- World Meteorological Organization (WMO)
- World Tourism Organization (UNWTO)
- World Trade Organization (WTO)

=== Law and order in Jamaica ===
Law of Jamaica

- Cannabis in Jamaica
- Capital punishment in Jamaica
- Constitution of Jamaica
- Crime in Jamaica
- Human rights in Jamaica
  - LGBT rights in Jamaica
  - Freedom of religion in Jamaica
- Law enforcement in Jamaica
- List of prisons in Jamaica

=== Military of Jamaica ===
Military of Jamaica

- Command
  - Commander-in-chief: Queen of Jamaica
    - Ministry of Defence of Jamaica
- Forces
  - Army of Jamaica
  - Navy of Jamaica
  - Air Force of Jamaica
  - Special forces of Jamaica
- Military history of Jamaica
- Military ranks of Jamaica

=== Local government in Jamaica ===
Local government in Jamaica

== History of Jamaica ==
History of Jamaica

- Timeline of the history of Jamaica
- Current events of Jamaica
- Military history of Jamaica

== Culture of Jamaica ==
Culture of Jamaica

- Architecture of Jamaica
  - Jamaican Georgian architecture
- Cuisine of Jamaica
  - List of Jamaican dishes
- Festivals in Jamaica
- Languages of Jamaica
- Media in Jamaica
- National symbols of Jamaica
  - Coat of arms of Jamaica
  - Flag of Jamaica
  - National anthem of Jamaica
- People of Jamaica
- Prostitution in Jamaica
- Public holidays in Jamaica
- Records of Jamaica
- Religion in Jamaica
  - Christianity in Jamaica
  - Hinduism in Jamaica
  - Islam in Jamaica
  - Judaism in Jamaica
  - Sikhism in Jamaica
- List of museums in Jamaica
- List of National Heritage Sites in Jamaica
- World Heritage Sites in Jamaica(none)

=== Art in Jamaica ===
- Art in Jamaica
- Cinema of Jamaica
- Literature of Jamaica
- Music of Jamaica
- Television in Jamaica
- Theatre in Jamaica

=== Sports in Jamaica ===
Sports in Jamaica

- Football in Jamaica
- Jamaica at the Olympics

== Economy and infrastructure of Jamaica ==
Economy of Jamaica

- Economic rank, by nominal GDP (2007): 110th (one hundred and tenth)
- Agriculture in Jamaica
- Banking in Jamaica
  - National Bank of Jamaica
- Communications in Jamaica
  - Internet in Jamaica
- Companies of Jamaica
- Currency of Jamaica: Dollar
  - ISO 4217: JMD
- Energy in Jamaica
  - Energy policy of Jamaica
  - Oil industry in Jamaica
- Mining in Jamaica
- Tourism in Jamaica
- Transport in Jamaica
- Jamaica Stock Exchange

== Education in Jamaica ==
Education in Jamaica

- List of schools in Jamaica
- List of colleges in Jamaica
- List of universities in Jamaica

== Infrastructure of Jamaica ==
- Health care in Jamaica
- Transportation in Jamaica
  - Airports in Jamaica
  - Rail transport in Jamaica
    - List of railway lines of Jamaica
    - List of railway stations in Jamaica
  - Roads in Jamaica
  - Water transport in Jamaica
    - List of lighthouses in Jamaica
- Water supply and sanitation in Jamaica
- Water resources management in Jamaica

== See also ==
Jamaica

- List of Jamaica-related topics
- List of international rankings
- Member state of the Commonwealth of Nations
- Member state of the United Nations
- Monarchy of Jamaica
- Outline of geography
- Outline of North America
