= Demographics of Jamaica =

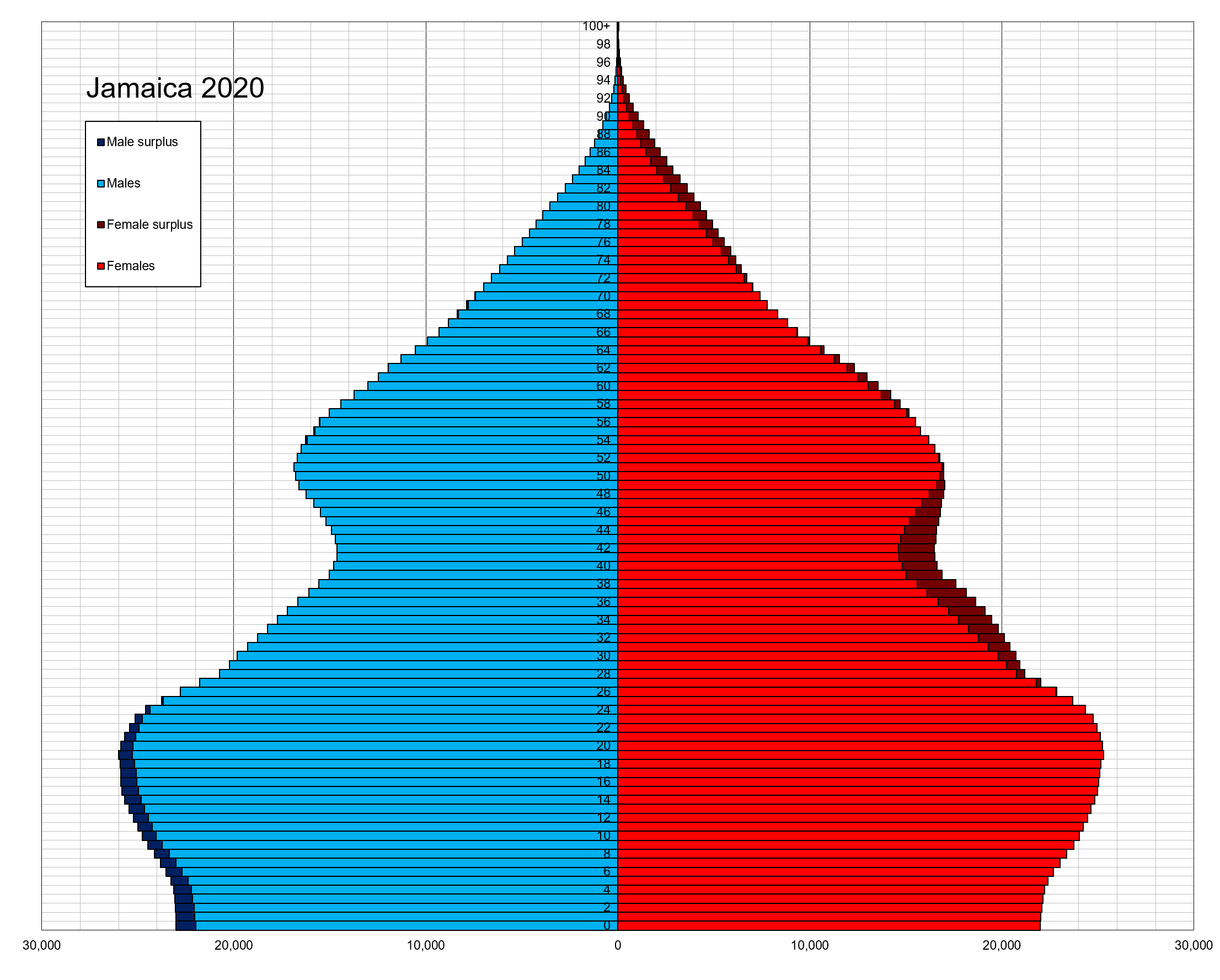
- Population pyramid of Jamaica in 2026
- Population: 2,834,683 as of August 2026
- Growth rate: 0.08% (2022 est.)
- Birth rate: 11.4 births/1,000 population (2022 est.)
- Death rate: 7.8 deaths/1,000 population (2022 est.)
- Life expectancy: 75.75 years
  - male: 73.98 years
  - female: 77.6 years
- Fertility rate: 1.3 children born/woman (2024)
- Infant mortality: 11.17 deaths/1,000 live births
- Net migration rate: −7.7 migrant(s)/1,000 population (2022 est.)

Age structure
- 0–14 years: 21.11%
- 15–64 years: 69.31%
- 65 and over: 9.58%

Nationality
- Nationality: Jamaican
- Major ethnic: African (76.3%)
- Minor ethnic: 15.1% Mulatto or Afro-European, 3.4% Indian or Afro-Indian, 3.2% White, 1.2% Chinese or Afro-Chinese, 0.8% Others (2024 est.)

Language
- Spoken: English; Jamaican Patois

Census population
Year	Pop.	±% p.a.
1844	377,433	—
1861	441,264	+0.92%
1871	506,154	+1.38%
1881	580,804	+1.39%
1891	639,491	+0.97%
1911	831,383	+1.32%
1921	858,118	+0.32%
1943	1,237,063	+1.68%
1960	1,609,814	+1.56%
1970	1,848,512	+1.39%
1982	2,190,357	+1.42%
1991	2,380,666	+0.93%
2001	2,607,632	+0.91%
2011	2,697,983	+0.34%
2022	2,774,538	+0.25%

Jamaica is an island country in the Caribbean. The country had a population of 2,834,683 as of August 2026, having the fourth largest population in the region.It is #142 in global population among nations.

Jamaica's annual population growth rate stood at 0.08% in 2022. As of 2023, 68.9% of Jamaicans were Christians in 2011, predominantly Protestant.

The racial demographics in the island of Jamaica are as follows: 76.3% African, 15.1% Afro-European, 3.4% Indian or Afro-Indian, 3.2% White, 1.2% Chinese or Afro-Chinese and 0.8% Others (2024 est.).

Wealth or economic power in Jamaica is disproportionately held by White Jamaicans, Chinese Jamaicans, Lebanese/Syrian Jamaicans, Indian Jamaicans and mixed-race Jamaicans (or locally called the Brown Man or Browning)— despite being minority groups (less than 25% of the country's population), they control most of the country's wealth.

Roughly 10 per cent of the population control over 60% of Jamaica's wealth.

== Population size and structure ==
According to the 2022 revision of the World Population Prospects the total population was 2,827,695 in 2021, compared to only 1,403,000 in 1950. The proportion of children below the age of 15 in 2010 was 29%, 63.1% was between 15 and 65 years of age, while 7.8% was 65 years or older.

	Total population (x 1000)	Proportion aged 0–14 (%)	Proportion aged 15–64 (%)	Proportion aged 65+ (%)
1950	1 403	36.0	60.1	3.9
1955	1 542	37.1	58.8	4.1
1960	1 629	41.8	53.9	4.3
1965	1 760	43.5	51.1	5.4
1970	1 869	47.0	47.4	5.6
1975	2 012	45.3	48.9	5.8
1980	2 132	40.3	53.0	6.8
1985	2 297	37.3	55.7	7.1
1990	2 365	35.1	57.5	7.4
1995	2 462	33.8	58.7	7.5
2000	2 582	32.5	59.6	7.9
2005	2 682	30.4	61.5	8.1
2010	2 741	27.1	64.5	8.4
2015	2 793	23.6	67.3	9.1
2019	2 734	20.8	69.5	9.7

=== Structure of the population ===
Population by sex and age group (Census 04.IV.2011):

Age group	Male	Female	Total	%
Total	1 334 533	1 363 450	2 697 983	100
0–4	106 107	103 764	209 871	7.78
5–9	114 792	111 586	226 378	8.39
10–14	136 183	130 403	266 586	9.88
15–19	139 777	134 881	274 658	10.18
20–24	125 243	125 468	250 711	9.29
25–29	109 919	116 201	226 120	8.38
30–34	87 810	97 685	185 495	6.88
35–39	86 647	97 109	183 756	6.81
40–44	85 656	88 268	173 924	6.45
45–49	79 201	76 188	155 389	5.76
50–54	67 297	70 598	137 895	5.11
55–59	50 717	50 081	100 798	3.74
60–64	44 407	43 650	88 057	3.26
65–69	32 543	32 621	65 164	2.42
70–74	24 627	26 649	51 276	1.90
75–79	19 847	22 915	42 762	1.58
80–84	13 258	17 480	30 738	1.14
85–89	7 267	11 190	18 457	0.68
90–94	2 303	4 618	6 921	0.26
95–99	808	1 695	2 503	0.09
100+	124	400	524	0.02
Age group	Male	Female	Total	Percent
0–14	357 082	345 753	702 835	26.05
15–64	876 674	900 129	1 776 803	65.86
65+	100 777	117 568	218 345	8.09

Population estimates by sex and age group (01.VII.2019):

Age group	Male	Female	Total	%
Total	1 351 515	1 381 024	2 732 539	100
0–4	88 769	85 290	174 059	6.37
5–9	97 299	93 948	191 247	7.00
10–14	106 720	104 712	211 432	7.74
15–19	118 895	113 888	232 783	8.52
20–24	130 614	127 184	257 798	9.43
25–29	126 322	123 540	249 862	9.14
30–34	109 010	112 958	221 968	8.12
35–39	95 108	103 970	199 078	7.29
40–44	77 021	89 154	166 175	6.08
45–49	78 742	87 344	166 086	6.08
50–54	75 767	77 096	152 863	5.59
55–59	69 089	67 139	136 228	4.99
60–64	54 822	56 388	111 210	4.07
65-69	41 595	41 171	82 766	3.03
70-74	32 319	33 155	65 474	2.40
75-79	21 380	23 690	45 070	1.65
80+	28 043	40 397	68 440	2.50
Age group	Male	Female	Total	Percent
0–14	292 788	283 950	576 738	21.11
15–64	935 390	958 661	1 894 051	69.31
65+	123 337	138 413	261 750	9.58

View source data.
View source data.
View source data.
View source data.

== Vital statistics ==
=== Registered births and deaths ===
	Average population	Live births	Deaths	Natural change	Crude birth rate (per 1000)	Crude death rate (per 1000)	Natural change (per 1000)	Crude migration rate (per 1000)	TFR
1900	750,000	26,800	16,200	10,600	35.7	21.6	14.1		
1901	756,000	32,100	17,200	14,900	42.5	22.8	19.7	-11.8	
1902	760,000	29,900	15,000	14,900	39.3	19.8	19.5	-14.3	
1903	770,000	30,900	19,100	11,800	40.1	24.8	15.3	-2.3	
1904	780,000	28,500	19,400	9,100	36.5	24.9	11.6	1.2	
1905	790,000	31,100	17,500	13,600	39.4	22.2	17.2	-4.6	
1906	790,000	30,700	21,200	9,500	38.9	26.8	12.1	-12	
1907	800,000	28,800	23,400	5,400	36.0	29.2	6.8	5.8	
1908	810,000	31,300	18,700	12,600	38.7	23.1	15.6	-3.2	
1909	820,000	32,300	18,600	13,700	39.4	22.7	16.7	-4.5	
1910	820,000	31,600	18,900	12,700	38.5	23.1	15.4	-15.5	
1911	831,000	32,500	18,500	14,000	39.1	22.3	16.8	11.6	
1912	830,000	32,500	21,100	11,400	39.2	25.4	13.8	-14.9	
1913	840,000	30,200	18,600	11,600	36.0	22.1	13.9	-1.9	
1914	840,000	33,400	18,400	15,000	39.8	21.9	17.9	-1.8	
1915	840,000	29,800	18,600	11,200	35.5	22.1	13.4	-13.3	
1916	840,000	28,700	19,400	9,300	34.2	23.1	11.1	-11.1	
1917	850,000	29,900	23,600	6,300	35.2	27.8	7.4	4.4	
1918	850,000	30,100	29,100	1,000	35.4	34.2	1.2	-0.1	
1919	850,000	29,700	19,500	10,200	34.9	22.9	12.0	-12	
1920	860,000	36,200	22,500	13,700	42.1	26.2	15.9	-4.3	
1921	858,000	29,900	24,300	5,600	34.9	28.3	6.6	-8.9	
1922	870,000	32,500	20,000	12,500	37.4	23.0	14.4	-0.6	
1923	890,000	34,400	20,500	13,900	38.7	23.0	15.7	6.9	
1924	910,000	33,700	19,900	13,800	37.0	21.9	15.1	6.8	
1925	930,000	32,500	20,100	12,400	34.9	21.6	13.3	8.2	
1926	950,000	36,500	19,500	17,000	38.4	20.5	17.9	19.3	
1927	960,000	33,300	20,300	13,000	34.7	21.1	13.6	9.1	
1928	980,000	35,100	19,300	15,800	35.8	19.7	16.1	4.3	
1929	1,000,000	34,200	18,400	15,800	34.2	18.4	15.8	4.2	
1930	1,020,000	38,300	17,600	20,700	37.5	17.3	20.2	-0.7	
1931	1,030,000	36,400	19,500	16,900	35.3	18.9	16.4	-6.7	
1932	1,047,000	34,200	18,200	16,000	32.7	17.4	15.3	14.7	
1933	1,067,000	35,600	21,000	14,600	33.4	19.7	13.7	5.1	
1934	1,081,000	34,247	18,731	15,516	31.7	17.3	14.4	-1.4	
1935	1,096,000	37,379	19,706	17,673	34.1	18.0	16.1	-2.4	
1936	1,111,000	36,561	19,629	16,932	32.9	17.7	15.2	-1.7	
1937	1,123,000	35,352	17,481	17,871	31.5	15.6	15.9	-5.2	
1938	1,142,000	37,970	19,124	18,846	33.3	16.8	16.5	0.1	
1939	1,162,000	37,474	17,536	19,938	32.3	15.1	17.2	0.1	
1940	1,183,000	36,462	18,243	18,219	30.8	15.4	15.4	2.4	
1941	1,205,000	37,829	17,317	20,512	31.4	14.4	17.0	1.2	
1942	1,227,000	40,165	17,545	22,620	32.7	14.3	18.4	-0.5	
1943	1,248,000	39,371	17,558	21,813	31.5	14.1	17.4	-0.7	
1944	1,260,000	41,772	18,976	22,796	33.2	15.1	18.1	-8.6	
1945	1,266,000	37,954	18,874	19,080	30.0	14.9	15.1	-10.3	
1946	1,292,000	39,918	17,272	22,646	30.9	13.4	17.5	2.6	
1947	1,321,000	43,267	18,770	24,497	32.8	14.2	18.5	3.4	
1948	1,345,000	41,463	17,869	23,594	30.8	13.3	17.5	0.3	
1949	1,365,000	44,377	16,859	27,518	32.5	12.4	20.2	-5.5	
1950	1,403,000	46,459	16,677	29,782	33.1	11.9	21.2	5.9	
1951	1,437,000	48,561	17,250	31,311	34.0	12.1	21.9	1.9	
1952	1,468,000	48,902	16,695	32,207	33.6	11.5	22.1	-0.8	
1953	1,496,000	51,131	15,442	35,689	34.4	10.4	24.0	-5.1	
1954	1,521,000	53,630	16,302	37,328	36.5	11.1	25.4	-8.1	
1955	1,542,000	55,767	15,328	40,439	37.5	10.3	27.2	-12.6	
1956	1,560,000	58,177	14,670	43,507	38.5	9.7	28.8	-16.4	
1957	1,576,000	60,445	14,129	46,316	39.4	9.2	30.2	-19.2	
1958	1,592,000	63,517	14,813	48,704	40.6	9.5	31.1	-20.5	
1959	1,609,000	63,874	16,549	47,325	39.9	10.3	29.6	-18.8	
1960	1,629,000	68,413	14,321	54,092	42.5	8.9	33.6	-20.9	
1961	1,652,000	66,128	14,193	51,935	40.5	8.7	31.8	-17.5	
1962	1,679,000	64,913	14,167	50,746	39.1	8.5	30.6	-14.1	
1963	1,707,000	66,189	15,159	51,030	39.0	8.9	30.1	-13.5	
1964	1,735,000	68,359	13,267	55,092	39.3	7.6	31.7	-15.6	
1965	1,760,000	69,768	14,084	55,684	39.6	8.0	31.6	-17.4	
1966	1,783,000	71,364	14,288	57,076	40.0	8.0	32.0	-19.1	
1967	1,804,000	67,438	13,295	54,143	37.4	7.4	30.0	-18.4	
1968	1,824,000	65,402	14,557	50,845	35.9	8.0	27.9	-16.9	
1969	1,845,000	64,668	14,094	50,574	35.1	7.6	27.4	-16	
1970	1,869,000	64,375	14,352	50,023	34.4	7.7	26.8	-13.9	
1971	1,896,000	66,277	14,078	52,199	34.9	7.4	27.5	-13.3	
1972	1,925,000	66,219	13,970	52,249	34.3	7.2	27.1	-12.1	
1973	1,955,000	61,857	14,157	47,700	31.6	7.2	24.3	-9.1	
1974	1,984,000	61,506	14,374	47,132	30.9	7.2	23.7	-9.1	
1975	2,012,000	61,462	14,004	47,458	30.3	6.9	23.4	-9.7	
1976	2,037,000	60,658	14,671	45,987	29.6	7.2	22.4	-10.3	
1977	2,059,000	60,423	14,245	46,178	29.1	6.9	22.3	-11.7	
1978	2,081,000	58,189	12,148	46,041	27.9	5.8	22.1	-11.6	
1979	2,105,000	59,126	13,297	45,829	28.0	6.3	21.7	-10.4	
1980	2,132,000	58,589	12,706	45,883	27.5	6.0	21.5	-8.9	3.56
1981	2,165,000	59,435	13,315	46,120	27.5	6.2	21.3	-6.1	3.50
1982	2,200,000	61,477	12,698	48,779	27.9	5.8	22.2	-6.3	3.40
1983	2,237,000	61,417	12,588	48,829	27.4	5.6	21.8	-5.3	3.21
1984	2,270,000	57,533	13,405	44,128	25.2	5.9	19.4	-4.9	2.73
1985	2,297,000	56,210	13,918	42,292	24.3	6.0	18.3	-6.7	2.56
1986	2,317,000	54,067	13,341	40,726	23.1	5.7	17.4	-8.9	2.40
1987	2,332,000	52,270	12,352	39,918	22.2	5.3	17.0	-10.7	2.27
1988	2,342,000	53,623	12,167	41,456	22.7	5.2	17.6	-13.4	2.31
1989	2,353,000	59,104	14,315	44,789	24.7	6.0	18.7	-14.4	2.43
1990	2,365,000	59,606	12,174	47,432	25.2	5.1	20.1	-15	2.45
1991	2,381,000	59,879	13,319	46,560	25.2	5.6	19.6	-12.8	2.44
1992	2,399,000	56,276	13,225	43,051	23.5	5.5	17.9	-10.4	2.34
1993	2,419,000	58,627	13,927	44,700	24.2	5.8	18.5	-10.2	2.44
1994	2,440,000	57,404	13,503	43,901	23.5	5.5	18.0	-9.4	2.38
1995	2,462,000	57,607	12,776	44,831	23.4	5.2	18.2	-9.3	2.37
1996	2,485,000	57,370	14,854	42,516	23.1	6.0	17.1	-7.9	2.33
1997	2,509,000	59,385	15,967	43,418	23.7	6.4	17.3	-7.7	2.42
1998	2,534,000	56,937	16,150	40,787	22.5	6.4	16.1	-6.2	2.29
1999	2,559,000	56,911	17,550	39,361	22.2	6.9	15.4	-5.6	2.29
2000	2,582,000	54,035	16,400	37,635	20.9	6.4	14.6	-5.7	2.13
2001	2,605,000	49,291	16,615	32,676	18.9	6.4	12.5	-3.7	1.92
2002	2,620,000	47,464	16,728	30,736	18.2	6.4	11.8	-6	1.84
2003	2,629,000	45,559	17,267	28,292	17.4	6.6	10.8	-7.3	1.77
2004	2,639,000	44,843	16,332	28,511	17.0	6.2	10.8	-7	1.73
2005	2,644,000	46,370	17,413	28,957	17.5	6.6	11.0	-9.1	1.81
2006	2,653,000	43,243	18,960	24,283	16.3	7.2	9.2	-5.8	1.70
2007	2,662,000	43,385	20,550	22,835	16.3	7.7	8.6	-5.2	1.71
2008	2,672,000	43,112	19,966	23,146	16.1	7.5	8.7	-4.9	1.70
2009	2,681,000	42,782	18,555	24,227	16.0	7.0	8.9	-5.7	1.68
2010	2,691,000	40,508	21,503	19,005	15.1	8.0	7.1	-3.3	1.57
2011	2,700,000	39,673	16,926	22,747	14.7	6.3	8.4	-5.1	1.54
2012	2,708,000	39,553	16,998	22,555	14.5	6.3	8.3	-5.4	1.55
2013	2,715,000	36,746	15,427	21,319	13.5	5.7	7.8	-5.3	1.52
2014	2,721,000	36,996	18,320	18,676	13.6	6.7	6.9	-4.7	1.51
2015	2,723,000	37,900	19,249	18,651	13.9	7.1	6.8	-6.1	1.53
2016	2,727,000	36,160	19,761	16,399	13.3	7.2	6.1	-4.5	1.50
2017	2,728,000	34,423	19,661	14,762	12.6	7.2	5.4	-5	1.46
2018	2,731,000	34,209	19,762	14,447					
1.45
2019	2,734,000	34,862	18,233	16,629	12.7	7.7	5.0	-5	1.47
2020	2,735,000	33,941	20,188	13,753	12.4	7.4	5.0	-4.7	1.43
2021	2,737,000	33,126	26,881	6,245	12.1	9.8	2.3	-1.6	1.39
2022	2,738,000	32,925	22,121	10,804	11.8	7.8	4.0	-3.6	1.38
2023		29,439	21,751	7,688	10.8				1.23
2024		25,942	20,497	5,445					1.09
2025		28,900	21,300	7,600					1.22

=== Life expectancy at birth ===
Period	Life expectancy in Years	Period	Life expectancy in Years
1950–1955	58.6	1985–1990	72.1
1955–1960	62.7	1990–1995	72.0
1960–1965	65.7	1995–2000	72.1
1965–1970	67.2	2000–2005	72.8
1970–1975	69.0	2005–2010	74.2
1975–1980	70.7	2010–2015	75.5
1980–1985	72.0		

Source: UN World Population Prospects

== Migration ==
Net Migration Data of Jamaica (2002–2019)
Year	Population	Net migration
2002	2,619,976	-21,177
2003	2,629,413	-18,789
2004	2,638,877	-18,959
2005	2,648,324	-19,436
2006	2,657,760	-14,873
2007	2,667,202	-13,470
2008	2,676,666	-13,741
2009	2,686,105	-14,515
2010	2,695,543	-9,718
2011	2,702,903	-15,480
2012	2,710,004	-15,516
2013	2,713,381	-17,947
2014	2,715,657	-15,252
2015	2,719,470	-14,926
2016	2,721,664	-14,296
2017	2,725,882	-10,647
2018	2,730,982	-9,474
2019	2,734,092	-11,775
2025	-	-7,000

== Ethnic groups ==
According to the most recent study by the University of the West Indies, Jamaica consists of the following ethnic groups, broken down by percentage: 76.3% African, 15.1% Afro-European, 3.4% Indian or Afro-Indian, 3.2% White, 1.2% Chinese or Afro-Chinese and 0.8% Others (2024 est.)

=== Historical ===
Year	Population	White	% W	Black	% B
1661	3,874	N/A	86.7%	N/A	13.3%
1673	17,272	N/A	45%	N/A	55%
1730	83,008	N/A	9.2%	N/A	90.8%
1774	209,617	N/A	6.1%	N/A	93.9%

== Languages ==
English, Jamaican Patois

== Religion ==
Protestant 64.8% (includes Seventh Day Adventist 12.0%, Pentecostal 11.0%, Other Church of God 9.2%, New Testament Church of God 7.2%, Baptist 6.7%, Church of God in Jamaica 4.8%, Church of God of Prophecy 4.5%, Anglican 2.8%, United Church 2.1%, Methodist 1.6%, Revived 1.4%, Brethren 0.9%, and Moravian 0.7%), Roman Catholic 2.2%, Jehovah's Witness 1.9%, Rastafarian 1.1%, other 6.5%, none 21.3%, unspecified 2.3% (2011 est.)

== See also ==
- Jamaicans
- Afro-Jamaican
- Cromanty
- List of cities and towns in Jamaica
