= International rankings of Jamaica =

These are the international rankings of Jamaica

== International rankings ==
Organization	Survey	Ranking
Institute for Economics and Peace	Global Peace Index	102 out of 144
United Nations Development Programme	Human Development Index	100 out of 182
Transparency International	Corruption Perceptions Index	99 out of 180
World Economic Forum	Global Competitiveness Report	91 out of 133
World Intellectual Property Organization	Global Innovation Index, 2026	87 out of 139
