= White Jamaicans =

Ethnic minority of Jamaica

Wait piipl ina Jumieka (Jamaican Patois)
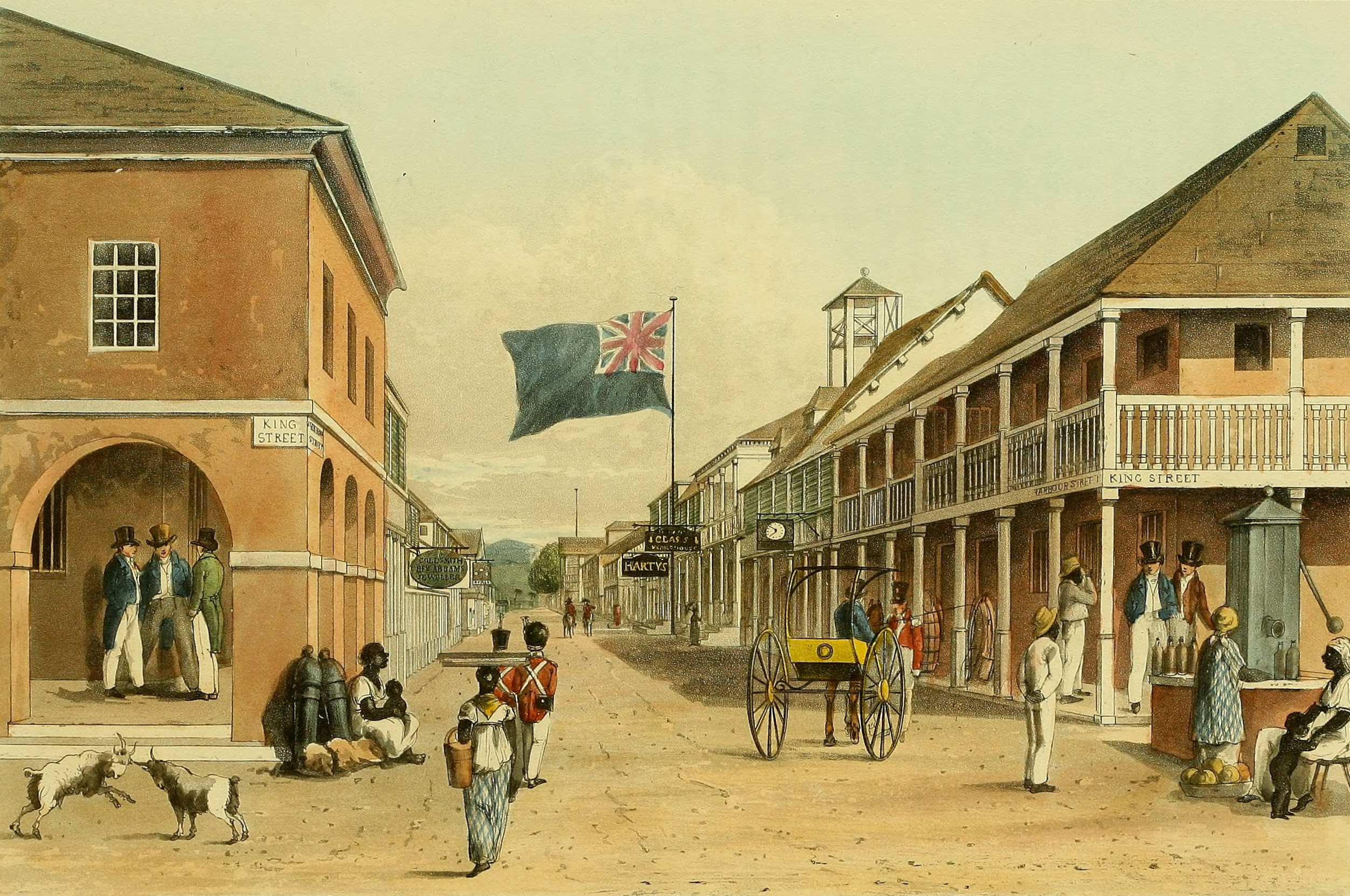
- Harbour Street, Kingston, c. 1820

Total population
- 3.2% of the total population (2024 est.)

Languages
- Jamaican English, Jamaican Patois, Irish, Spanish, Portuguese, German, French, Dutch, Yiddish

Religion
- Christianity, Judaism

Related ethnic groups
- White Caribbeans, White Bermudians, White Dominicans (Dominica), British diaspora in Africa

White Jamaicans or European Jamaicans are Jamaican people whose ancestry lies within the continent of Europe, most notably Great Britain and Ireland. There are also communities of people who are descendants of people who arrived from Spain, Germany, Portugal, France and to a lesser extent the Netherlands and other West European countries.

== Overview ==
Initially, the Spanish colonized the island in 1494 and, subsequently, the English began taking an interest in it. Following a failed attempt to conquer Santo Domingo on Hispaniola, Admiral William Penn and General Robert Venables successfully led an invasion of Jamaica in 1655. After defeat, the Spanish left, aside from the Spanish Jews, and were eventually replaced by a predominately English and Irish white population.

By the 1670s, Jamaica had brought in more enslaved Africans to work on sugar plantations, which then made up the majority of the island’s population. During the First Maroon War, Jamaicans who escaped from slavery fought against British colonialists, leading to another decline in Jamaica's white population.

The White population would dramatically decrease during the 1800s, making up only 4% of the population at a peak.

According to the most recent study by the University of the West Indies, Jamaica, 3.2% of Jamaica's population is considered White, while 15.1% is of Afro-European descent (2024 est.). Over half of the White population lives in the Saint Andrew Parish.

== Terminology ==
A number of Jamaicans have fair or light skin, European features, and majority European ancestry. In colonial times, it was common for such people to identify simply as "white" or "mulatto"; however, since independence, it has been more common for them to identify as "brown" or "mixed". For instance, some Jamaican heads of government (Norman Manley, Alexander Bustamante, Edward Seaga, Donald Sangster and Michael Manley) had a light-skinned appearance and majority European ancestry, but were not generally considered "white" within Jamaica. Foreign writers applying their own countries' racial standards would sometimes identify them as white– writing for The New York Times, Nicholas Kristof observed that a "95 per cent black population elected a white man – Edward Seaga – as its prime minister". However, Seaga was born to a Lebanese father and a mixed-race mother.

== Demographic history ==
Christopher Columbus, the first European to arrive in Jamaica, claimed the island for Spain on May 3, 1494, during his second voyage to the New World. The Spaniards ruled Jamaica for 161 years, thus the proportion of white people among the overall population varied considerably since the establishment of a permanent Spanish settlement in 1509 by Juan de Esquivel. By 1600, a vast majority of the native Taíno people were decimated, resulting in the island's population being predominantly European.

Jamaica became a colony of England in 1655, and a census in 1662 recorded 3,653 whites (87% of the population) and 552 blacks (13% of the population). However, by 1673 there were 7,768 whites (45% of the population) and 9,504 blacks (55% of the population). By the end of the century only about 7,000 out of a total population of 47,000 (or 15%) were white. Most white immigrants were British, many coming voluntarily from other North American colonies or as refugees from colonies like Montserrat and Suriname, which were captured by other European powers.

By 1734, the proportion of white people had decreased to below 10% of the overall population of Jamaica. In 1774, Edward Long estimated that a third of Jamaica's white population were Scottish, mostly concentrated in Westmoreland Parish. In 1787, there were only 12,737 whites out of a total population of 209,617. There was a flow of French refugees to Jamaica after the Haitian Revolution, though not all remained in the country. In the 1830s, over 1,000 Germans immigrated to Jamaica to work on Lord Seaford's estate. The 1844 census showed a white population of 15,776 out of a total population of 377,433 (around 4%). According to the 1871 census, at least 25% of the population was coloured (having mixed black and white ancestry).

The 1960 census recorded a white population of 0.77 percent, which decreased to 0.66 in 1970, 0.18 in 2001, and 0.16 in 2011. As with most Anglo-Caribbean countries, most Jamaicans who are of mixed ancestry self-report as 'black'. According to the University of the West Indies study (2024 est.), the population of Jamaicans who are of European as well as mixed Afro-European ancestry is approximately 18.3%.

European slave traders brought Gypsy slaves to Jamaica.

== Notable White Jamaicans ==
- Samantha Albert (b. 1971), equestrian
- Gerry Alexander OD (1928–2011), West Indies cricket captain
- Monty Alexander OJ (b. 1944), jazz pianist
- Ivan Barrow (1911–1979), cricketer
- Peter Beckford (1672–1735), politician
- William Beckford (1709–1770), plantation owner, Lord Mayor of London
- Isaac Mendes Belisario (1795–1849), artist
- Martine Beswick (b. 1941), actress, Bond girl
- Blaise Bicknell (b. 2001), tennis player
- Blanche Blackwell (nee Lindo) (1912–2017), heiress, mother of Chris Blackwell and Ian Fleming's muse
- Chris Blackwell (b. 1937), record producer and the founder of Island Records
- Cindy Breakspeare (b. 1954), model, Miss World 1976
- Lady Colin Campbell (b. 1949), socialite and writer
- Frederic G. Cassidy (1907–2000), editor of the Dictionary of Jamaican English and the Dictionary of American Regional English
- Alexander J. Dallas (1759–1817), U.S. Secretary of the Treasury
- Jacob De Cordova (1808–1868), founder of the Jamaica Daily Gleaner newspaper
- H. G. de Lisser (1878–1944), author and journalist
- R. James deRoux CD (1930–2012), businessman and Custos Rotulorum
- Keanan Dols (b. 1998), swimmer
- George Ellis (1753–1815), writer
- Gloria Escoffery OD (1923–2002), painter
- Tom Tavares-Finson (b. 1953), attorney-at-law and President of the Senate of Jamaica
- Henry Fowler CD (1915–2007), educator, chairman of the Jamaica Broadcasting Corporation
- Mark Golding (b. 1965), attorney-at-law, Opposition Leader of Jamaica and President of the People’s National Party since 2020
- Carolyn Gomes OJ (b. 1958), doctor, human rights activist and co-founder of Jamaicans for Justice
- Thomas J. Goreau (b. 1950), biogeochemist and marine biologist
- Joni Van Ryck De Groot (b. 1955), tennis player
- Anthony Keith Edmund Hart OJ CD (1932–2020) businessman, philanthropist and politician
- Guy Harvey (b. 1955), conservationist and artist
- Perry Henzell (1936–2006), film director
- Lewis Hutchinson (1733–1773), serial killer
- Samantha J (b. 1996), singer
- Francis Moncrieff Kerr-Jarrett (1885–1968), businessman
- William Knibb (1803–1845), Baptist missionary, first white man to receive Jamaican Order of Merit
- Abraham Alexander Lindo (1775–1849), merchant and developer
- Alexander Joseph Lindo (1799–1867), merchant, planter, Member of House of Assembly of Jamaica and Custos rotulorum of St. Mary
- Archie Lindo (1908–1990), photographer, actor, author, playwright and radio show broadcaster
- Cecil Vernon Lindo (1870–1960), banker, industrialist, planter and philanthropist
- Frederick Lindo (1821–1882), merchant, publisher and Member of the Legislative Council
- Percy Lindo (1877–1946), banker, planter, industrialist and Member of the Legislative Council of Jamaica
- Roy Lindo (1910–1962), industrialist, planter, political economist, politician and Member of the Legislative Council of Jamaica
- Edward Long (1734–1813), writer, author of the History of Jamaica
- Agnes Macdonald, 1st Baroness Macdonald of Earnscliffe (1836–1920)
- Edna Manley (1900–1987), sculptor and mother of Prime Minister Michael Manley
- Justin Masterson (born in 1985 to American parents in Kingston, after a few years raised in the US)
- Fraser McConnell (b. 1998), national rally driver
- Keble Munn OJ (1920–2008), politician, agriculturalist and World War II veteran
- Paul Nash, (b. 1943), swimmer
- Brendan Nash (b. 1977), cricketer and son of Paul Nash
- Karl Nunes (1894–1958), inaugural West Indies cricket captain and president of the West Indies Cricket Board of Control
- Evelyn O'Callaghan (b. 1954), professor of West Indian literature at the University of the West Indies
- Alex Powell (b. 2007), racing driver
- Simon Preston (b. 1993), Press Officer, Jamaica Football Federation*
- Arthur William Savage (1857–1938), founder of Savage Arms and inventor of radial tyres as well as new production methods
- Sydney Schneider (b.1999), footballer
- Adam Stewart (b. 1981), businessman
- Butch Stewart OJ CD (1941–2021), businessman, founder of Sandals Resorts and Beaches Resorts
- Betsy Sullivan, (b. 1956), first Jamaican diver to compete at the 1966 Commonwealth Games and 1972 Olympics
- Ronald Thwaites (b. 1945), attorney-at-law and former Minister of Education from 2012 to 2016
- Gail Vaz-Oxlade (b. 1959), financial writer and television personality
- White Yardie, stage name of Harry Gregory, British comedian and social media personality
- David Weller (b. 1957), cyclist and bronze medallist at the 1980 Olympic Games
- Cicely Williams OM (1893–1992), medical researcher, discoverer of kwashiorkor
- Jenna Wolfe (b. 1974), American journalist born in Jamaica and raised in Haiti

== See also ==
- Spanish Jamaicans
- Germans in Jamaica
- Irish people in Jamaica
- Scottish Jamaicans
- History of the Jews in Jamaica
- Lebanese Jamaicans
- British Jamaicans
- French immigration to Jamaica
- Demographics of Jamaica
