= Costa Rican cuisine =

Cuisine originating from Costa Rica

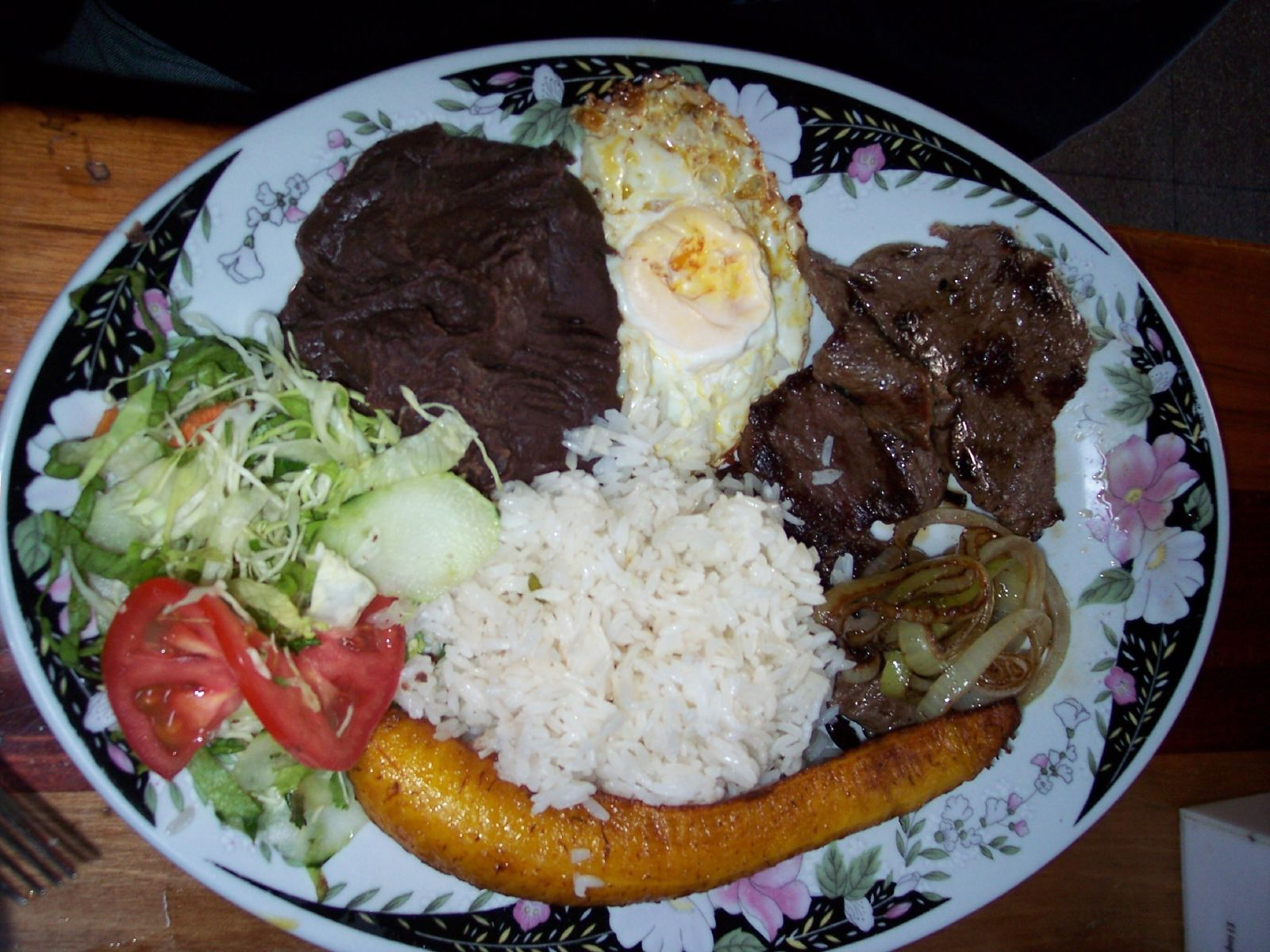
Casado

Costa Rican cuisine is known for being mostly mild, with high reliance on fruits and vegetables. Rice and black beans are a staple of most traditional Costa Rican meals, often served three times a day. Costa Rican fare is nutritionally well rounded, and nearly always cooked from scratch from fresh ingredients. Owing to the location of the country, tropical fruits and vegetables are readily available and included in the local cuisine.

Owing to the contrast of Costa Rica's large tourist economy with the many rural communities throughout the country, the foods available, especially in the more urban areas, have come to include nearly every type of cuisine in addition to traditional Costa Rican dishes. Cities such as San José, the capital, and beach destinations frequented by tourists offer a range of ethnic foods, from Peruvian to Japanese. Chinese and Italian food are popular with Costa Ricans (known locally as Ticos; Tica is the feminine form), and can be found around the country, though with varying levels of quality. Food is an important aspect of Costa Rican culture, and family gatherings and celebrations are often centered around meals.

The Indigenous peoples of Costa Rica, including the Chorotega, consumed maize as a large part of their diet during the pre-Columbian era. Although modern Costa Rican cuisine is very much influenced by the Spanish conquest of the country, corn still maintains a role in many dishes. Tamales, originally introduced to all of Central America by the Aztecs, are served at nearly all celebratory events in Costa Rica and especially at Christmas. They are made out of dough of cornmeal, lard, and spices, stuffed with various mixtures of meat, rice, and vegetables and wrapped and steamed in a plantain or banana leaf. The Chorotega native people prefer to stuff their tamales with deer or turkey meat, pumpkin seeds, tomatoes, and sweet peppers.

The Caribbean coast of Costa Rica comes with its own host of Afro-Caribbean influenced traditions. During the holidays, it is common to find pork cracklings and a tripe soup called mondongo. Rice and beans is a common dish on the Caribbean side, not to be confused with gallo pinto and other dishes containing rice and beans; this dish consists of rice and beans cooked in coconut milk and typically served with fish and some type of fried plantain.

== Basic elements ==
Rice and beans are included in nearly every Costa Rican meal, especially breakfast. Potatoes are another Costa Rican staple, part of the starch-rich Tico diet. Pork and beef are the most commonly eaten meats, but chicken and fish dishes are also widely available, especially on the Caribbean coast.

The plantain, a larger member of the banana family, is another commonly used fruit and can be served in a variety of ways. Ripe plantains (platanos maduros) have a sweet flavor and can be fried in oil, baked in a honey or a sugar-based sauce, or put in soups. Green (unripe) plantains can be boiled in soups or can be sliced, fried, smashed and then refried to make patacones. These are often served with a bean dip or guacamole.

Salsa Lizano was created in 1920 by a Costa Rican company called the Lizano company. During the 20th century, it became a common condiment and a staple element of Tico cooking in both households and restaurants all around the country. It has a tangy flavor and combines the following ingredients: water, sugar, salt, onions, carrots, cauliflower, cucumber, pepper, mustard, turmeric, and monosodium glutamate. Salsa Lizano is used in many Costa Rican dishes, including gallo pinto and tamales. It is comparable to Worcestershire sauce and is often called salsa inglesa ('English sauce'). Increasingly, it is becoming more available outside the country.

== Traditional dishes ==
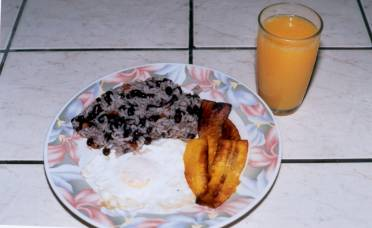
A typical Costa Rican breakfast consisting of gallo pinto, fried plantains, an egg, and orange juice

Gallo pinto, which has a literal meaning of "spotted rooster", is the national dish of Costa Rica. It consists of rice and beans stir-fried together in a pan to create a speckled appearance. It is usually served for breakfast along with scrambled or fried eggs and sour cream or cheese. Seasonings in the mixture of rice and red or black beans include cilantro, red pepper, onion, celery, and Salsa Lizano. Gallo pinto is also the national dish of neighboring country Nicaragua. There is controversy throughout both countries and their regions as to the perfect composition of beans, rice, and spices in this dish. Pinto, the term the locals use to refer to this dish, is available all over the country at affordable prices.

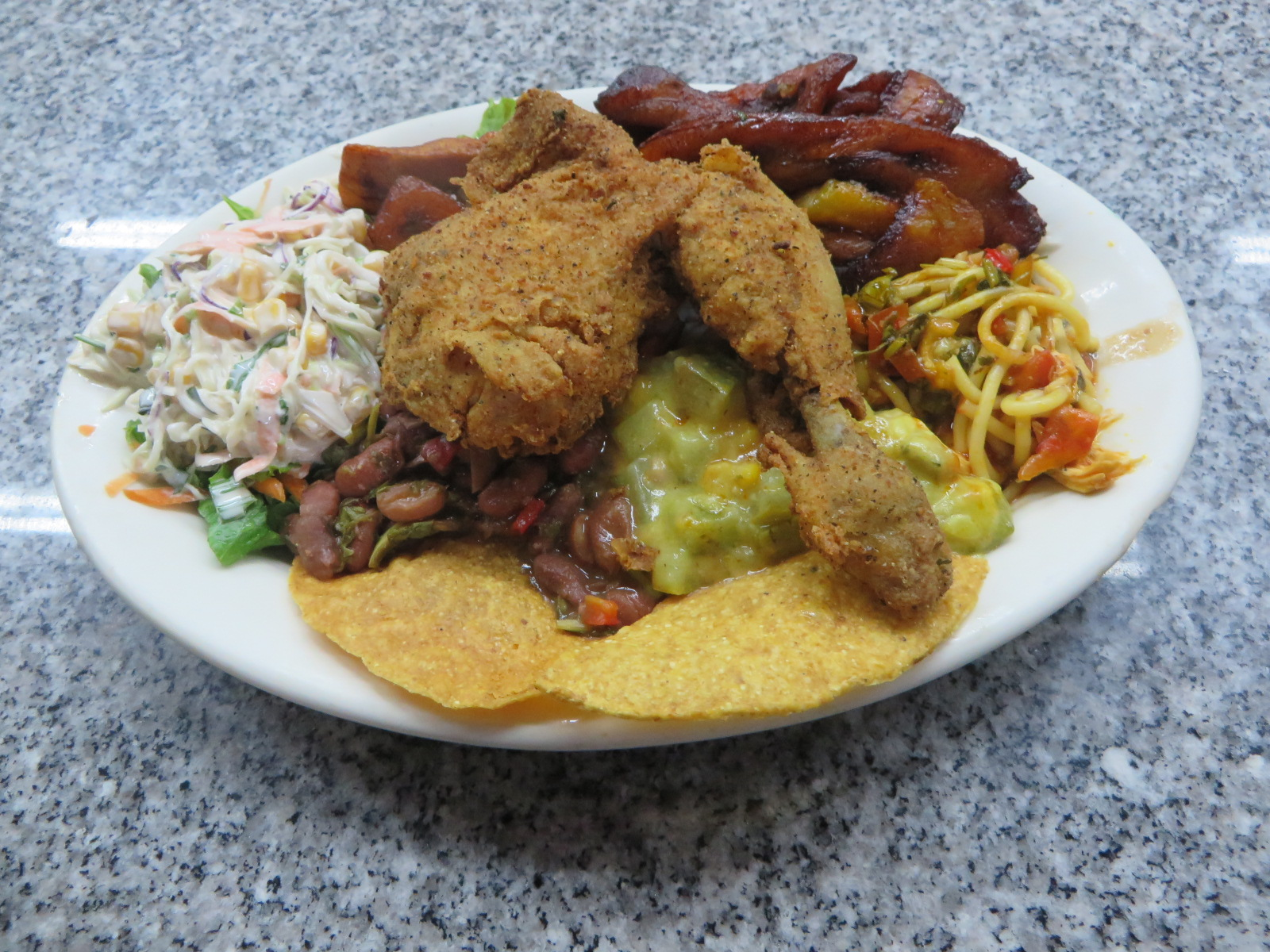
A casado served in a soda (small, cheap restaurant) in San José

For lunch, the traditional meal is called a casado. Casado means "married man" in Spanish, acquiring the name from when wives would pack their husbands a lunch in a banana leaf when they left to go work in the fields. It is a square meal consisting of rice and beans served side-by-side instead of mixed. There will usually be some type of meat (beef, fish, pork chop, or chicken) and a salad to round out the dish. There may also be some extras like fried plantain (patacones or maduro), a slice of white cheese or corn tortillas in accompaniment.

At family gatherings or for special occasions, it is very common to prepare arroz con pollo, which is rice with chicken mixed with vegetables and mild spices, and of course Salsa Lizano.

Bocas, or boquitas, are Costa Rican-style appetizers, usually consisting of a small snack item or portion of a dish typically served at a main meal. These are available at most bars, taverns, and at large gatherings and parties. Patacones are a typical boquita, along with gallos, or small Tico-style tacos consisting of beef, chicken, or arracache (a starchy vegetable) inside a warm corn tortilla.

Ceviche, sometimes spelled seviche, is a dish made up of raw fish and seafood that can include octopus, shrimp, shellfish, tilapia, dorado, dolphinfish and sea bass. The raw seafood is marinated in lemon juice, which "cooks" it by breaking down proteins. It is then mixed with seasonings such as fresh coriander (cilantro), onion, garlic, and chilis.

Chicharrón is fried, crispy pork, popular in bars and with locals. Chifrijo, a dish that has become popular since the 1990s, earned its name from its combination of the two foods chicharrón and frijoles (beans). Accompanied with rice and pico de gallo, a fresh salsa, this snack is often served with tortilla chips.

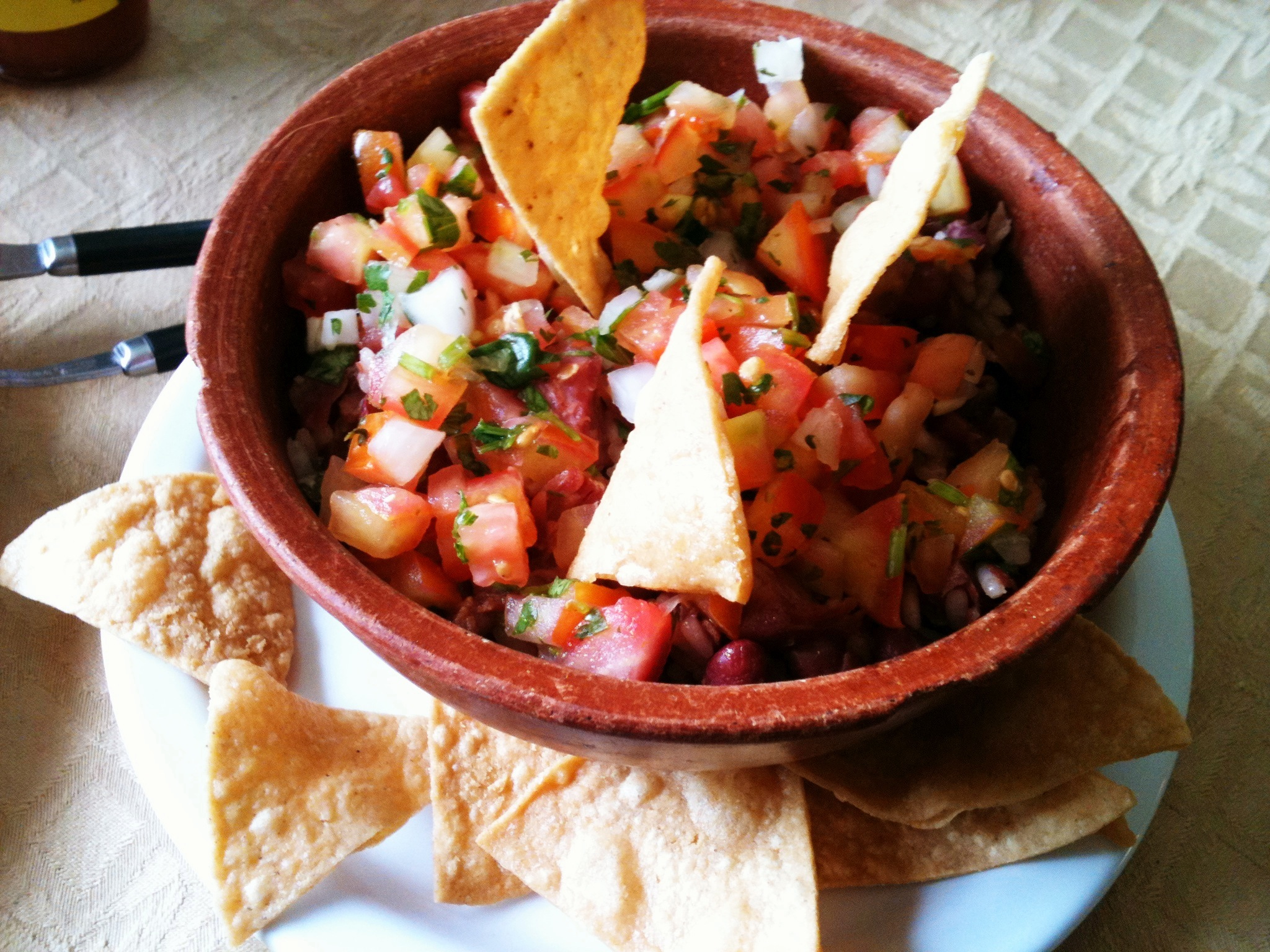
Chifrijo

Olla de carne, or "pot of beef", is a stew that comes from the Spanish influences in post-colonial era Costa Rica and contains beef, cassava (a starchy tuber used in Tico cooking), potatoes, maize, green plantains, squash or chayote, and other vegetables.

Small snack stands or stores, called sodas, often sell corn turnovers called empanadas filled with ground beef, chicken, cheese, or a fruit mixture. Another popular snack or side dish is yuca frita, or fried yuca (cassava), comparable to fried potatoes but with a sweeter flavor.

Chorreadas are not as common as many other traditional dishes. They are corn pancakes and are served for breakfast with sour cream.

== Beverages ==
Coffee, already one of the largest exports of Costa Rica, is offered in nearly every restaurant and household in the country. Served black or with milk (known as café con leche), it is generally strong and of high quality. Costa Rica has a strong coffee culture, and the beverage is consumed daily by most Costa Ricans. It is usually served with breakfast, in the afternoon, and occasionally after dinner. Coffee in Costa Rica is traditionally drip coffee brewed in a chorreador, but comercial machines and espresso are increasingly becoming more popular outside the home.

Agua dulce is a common Tico drink, made of tapa de dulce (raw cane sugar, also called panela) dissolved in hot water. This drink is particularly common in the cooler highlands and surrounding mountains of the country.

Frescos and batidos are drinks made from fresh fruit and milk or water. Among the fruits used are papaya, mango, watermelon, cantaloupe, pineapple, strawberry, blackberry, banana, carrot, tamarind, guanábana and cas, a sour fruit native to Central America. A variant of Horchata (a drink that originated in Spain) can be found in the northwestern Guanacaste Province, where it is made with cornmeal and cinnamon. A holiday beverage of homemade ginger beer is found on the Caribbean side of the country, and is sometimes mixed with wine.

Refrescos is the local name for bottled soft drinks, which are widely sold. Most common brands are available, although in rural areas, vendors sometimes sell soft drinks in plastic bags, which are cheaper than cans or bottles.

Agua de pipa is a green coconut with a straw to drink the water found inside. Vendors, called piperos, typically walk around selling green coconuts in touristy areas, and when one is purchased, the vendor chops off the top with a machete and puts a straw into it.

A commonly used term in Costa Rican restaurants is agua con gas meaning "water with gas", or carbonated water. Water is generally potable in Costa Rica, but this is not guaranteed.

In Costa Rica, beer is the most commonly consumed alcoholic drink. Imperial and Pilsen are the two most widely popular beers in the country. Imperial was founded in 1924, Pilsen in 1888. Imperial is known by the eagle on its label, which is emblazoned on shirts all over the country, and has a slightly lower alcohol content than Pilsen. Bavaria is another local beer, slightly more expensive and enjoyed by a smaller crowd. Microbrews are also increasingly available in Costa Rica, including those made by the Costa Rica Craft Brewing Company.

Michelada is a popular beer in Costa Rica. While slightly different from the Mexican michelada, the Costa Rican one is a bit more simple. It is composed of fresh lime juice, beer, and salt around the rim of the glass. It can be ordered at practically any restaurant or sodita and is very refreshing. Local hard liquors include rum, guaro, and coffee liqueur. The most commonly served rums are Ron Centenario, which is made in Costa Rica, and Nicaraguan rum Flor de Caña. Guaro is a strong-tasting hard liquor made from sugarcane, similar to vodka. It is usually consumed in a mixed drink called a guaro sour, or by the shot. The government created the brand of guaro called Cacique (meaning chieftain) in an effort to stop illegal moonshine manufacturing. Café Rica is a locally produced coffee liqueur. There is also a traditional alcoholic beverage originally made by the Chorotega people of Costa Rica called Vino de Coyol (Coyol wine). It is made by fermenting the sweet, watery sap of the coyol tree, a spiny palm.

=== Beer ===
Florida Ice and Farm Company was founded by the Lindo Morales brothers in September 1908. Over the following century, the division of Fifco known as Cervecería Costa Rica came to hold what was described as an almost "imperial" predominance of the Costa Rican beer market. Company representatives argued that tariff reductions would have little effect because transportation costs would make it difficult for foreign brands to compete on equal terms with Costa Rican ones.

== Sweets and desserts ==
Most Costa Rican desserts are made up of milk, corn, sugarcane, eggs, and/or fruit. In the province of Limón, a majority of the desserts are made from a coconut base as well as from fried plantains. In the province of Guanacaste, the main dessert ingredient is usually corn, while in the Province of Puntarenas it is primarily milk, coconut, and fruit.

One of the most common desserts is tres leches, meaning "three milks" in English. It is a wet cake composed primarily of milk and sugar. The ingredients include whole milk, evaporated skim milk, sweetened condensed milk, as well as heavy cream, eggs, sugar, ground cinnamon, baking powder, vanilla extract, and dark rum. It is available at many restaurants and is usually eaten after lunch or dinner.

Fruit salad is another popular dessert in Costa Rica. Some of the fruits typically used in this dish include fresh watermelon, mango, papaya, pineapple, and banana.

A typical Christmas dessert is queque navideño, or Christmas cake. It is similar to fruitcake and is made with dried fruit. It is a sweet and heavy dessert, which is usually soaked in rum for a few days before it is baked. However, Ticos often joke about getting drunk from the cake. Costa Ricans enjoy giving this Christmas cake away to friends and families as gifts.

== Notable people ==
- Isabel Campabadal, who was awarded the 2019 Magon Prize for her contributions to Costa Rican culinary heritage.
