= Beer in Costa Rica =

Costa Rica has a very strong beer industry centered on mass-produced Lagers. Imperial beer, produced by Florida Ice & Farm Co. is known and associated with Costa Rica all around the world.

Due to its geographic location, Costa Rica is not able to grow the raw materials for beer, which hinders the growth of a completely local food product, and depends heavily on imported raw materials.

== History ==
In February 1852, a brewery patent was established at a price of fifty pesos. By April 1856 there were advertisements in the Boletín Oficial newspaper about the Cerveza de Torres (Torres Beer), a barley and hops beer, by the Joy & von Schröter commercial house, at a price of two pesos, or fourteen reales if returning the bottle. Later a dark beer was produced by the same brewery, but this business closed by 1861.

In 1867, James Hasland, British, and Arthur Kopper, German, opened a beer brewery in Cartago. Next year, in1868, the President of Costa Rica, José María Castro Madriz, requested Karl Johanning to build a brewery in San José, which was managed by the state as an enterprise to pursue funds due to a coffee production crisis.

By the last two decades of the 19th century, at least six breweries were producing beer in San José and Cartago, where in 1885 Cervecería del León was able to produce up to 7,500 bottles each day. Cervecería Irazú was another brewery in the Cartago province at the time.

José Traube Tichy, born and raised in Saaz, Bohemia, founded Cervecería Globo (Globe Brewery) in 1888 century in Cartago, which was later moved to Cuesta de Moras in San José and was known as Cervecería y Refresquería Traube (Traube Brewery and Bottled Drinks), and later moved again to the Torres river margin, to use its waters, where it was renamed Gran Cervecería Traube, for many years the slope where it was located was known as Cuesta de Traube (Traube Slope) and the mules to transport the beer were widely recognized. This brewery produced the Pilsen Traube, Selecta and Pájaro Azul beers.

On September 16, 1908, the brothers Cecil, Stanley, Rupert and Percy Lindo Morales from Jamaica started in Siquirres, Limón Province a company located on a farm called La Florida, which until then was a major producer of ice and other agricultural produce. This company was called Florida Ice & Farm Co., inscribed in English due to their native language, which was the most common in the Costa Rican Caribbean by then.

Florida Ice & Farm Co. acquired Gran Cervecería Traube in 1912 with which the company started to brew its beers, the beer now known as Pilsen is the legacy of Pilsen Traube. In 1966 Gran Cervecería Traube was closed.

In 1914 an immigrant family from Spain, headed by Mr. Manuel Ortega, and his sons, Antonio, Eloy and Manuel, were the owners of a bottled drink factory that used mineral spring waters from Salitral, Santa Ana, San José, and decided to start to brew the beers Imperial and Bavaria using such source of water. In 1957 Florida Ice & Farm Co. acquired the Ortega beer brewery, and continues the production of the Imperial and Bavaria beers to date.

In the 1930s, Cervecería Gambrinus was established, created by European immigrants.

Cervecería Tropical, founded and owned by Cuban immigrants brewed Cerveza Tropical, in 1977 Florida Ice & Farm Co. acquired part of the company, and finally bought it completely in 1988, thus consolidating the beer production in the country in a single company.

=== Craft beer in Costa Rica ===
Until the beginning of the 21st Century, there was no easy way to acquire or taste other kind of beer brewed in Costa Rica other than those produced by Florida Ice & Farm Co., which reduced the available styles to industrial-scale lagers. The lack of local ingredients and not very clear laws restricting the volume of beer brewed by individuals or small companies, were also factors on the lack of variety.

The now defunct restaurant K&S in Curridabat, which opened in 1997, started the production of craft beer for general consumption on its premises. After closing the restaurant, they continued the production of their beers "Chivo Blanco" and "K&S Lager" until 2009.

The first microbrew pub in Costa Rica was established in 1998 in San Jose under the name Cabeza Grande. Cabeza Grande later closed the San Jose location and re-opened on the shores of Lake Arenal in 2010 as Lake Arenal Brewery, an eco-brewery. The claim for 'eco-brewery' is supported by the brewery's use of solar power for 100% of its brew operations, the use of gravity fed spring water, and the recycling of spent grain for their organic farm.

Later, in 2010, Costa Rica Craft Beer Co. jumpstarted the trend by producing its brands, "Segua" and "Libertas", and several microbreweries started to appear in the next years, many of them guided by the experience of expatriate residents coming from the United States.

Around 2012 a few companies such as TicoBirra and La Bodega de Chema started to import and sell to particulars the required ingredients (such as malt, hops or yeast), the equipment and tools, and also started to teach in workshops how to brew beer. This accelerated the creation of new breweries.

Since 2012, the Festival de Cerveza Artesanal (Craft Beer Festival) has showcased the current brews in the craft beer scene of Costa Rica, its growth from 400 attendees in the first appearance to around 3000 in the 2014 edition shows a significant growth of the industry and the newly acquired taste for different kind of beers for the local Costa Ricans.

By 2014 the impact of the microbreweries on the local market prompted Florida Ice & Farm Co. to start its craft beer division, called La Micro Brewing Company.

In 2022, there were around 200 micro-breweries. While most breweries are in the capital, Guanacaste Province experienced a boom in craft beer.

==== Trademark disputes ====
In 2013, the microbrewery El Búho Cervecería Artesanal, started to sell their beer, Búho, an imperial stout style of beer, however the trademark was not registered. In 2014, the microbrewery offshoot of Florida Ice & Farm Co., La Micro Brewing Company, started to produce and sell Búho, a bock style beer, and registered the trademark name. A legal dispute was ensued, and the trademark office of Costa Rica, finally issued the trademarked name "Búho" to Florida Ice & Farm Co. El Búho Cervecería Artesanal changed its name to Bora Brewing Company.

== See also ==
- Beer in Central America
