= Percy Lindo =

Jamaican industrialist, financier (1877–1946)

The Honourable Percival Henriques Lindo
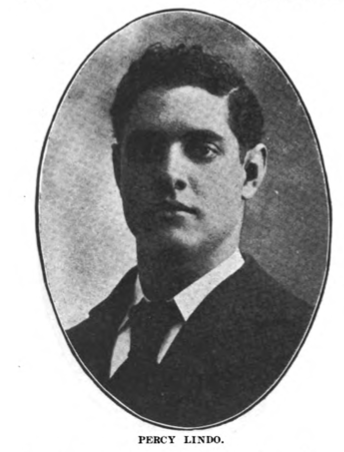
- Born: 30 September 1877; Falmouth, Jamaica
- Died: 1946 (aged 68–69); Terra Nova, Kingston, Jamaica
- Children: 4, including Roy Lindo, Blanche Blackwell
- Father: Frederick Lindo
- Relatives: Cecil Vernon Lindo (brother) Stanley Alexander Lindo (brother)

Percy Lindo was a Jamaican banker, planter, industrialist and member of the Legislative Council of Jamaica.

== Early life ==
Percival Henriques Lindo, nicknamed Percy was born on 30 September 1877, in Falmouth, Jamaica, to Frederick Lindo and Grace Morales. He was the youngest of ten children.

== Career ==
He migrated to Costa Rica in 1890 at age 13 to join his older brothers in business.

The brothers had arrived in 1885 to work for Minor Cooper Keith, who was building a railroad from Limon to San Jose, but quickly went into business as merchants, bankers and banana planters.

In 1907, the brothers purchased Juan Viñas, a vast sugar and coffee farm from Federico Tinoco Granados. They became largest coffee and sugar producers in the Costa Rica.

In 1908, the brothers founded the Florida Ice and Farm Company in Siquirres, Limón Province. The company was located at a farm called La Florida and was a major producer of ice and other agricultural produce. The company acquired Gran Cervecería Traube in 1912.

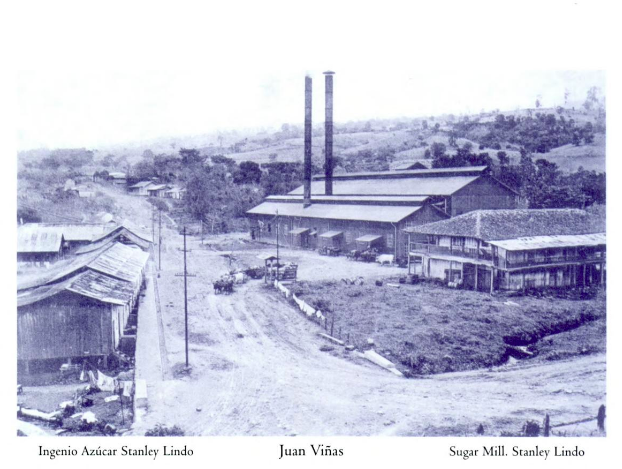
Lindo Sugar Factory at Juan Viñas

In 1911, the Lindo Brothers, in partnership with Felipe Alvarado, purchased the Compañía Luz Eléctrica de San Jose, Heredia y Alajuela and invested in a large hydroelectric power plant in Belén the next year. In 1924 the company was transformed into La Compañía Nacional de Electricidad

By 1911, the Lindo properties were producing half of Costa Rica's bananas, and Joseph DiGiorgio, on behalf of the Atlantic Fruit Company, approached Lindo Brothers with idea of purchasing all of their banana plantations, although the entire production was contracted to United Fruit Company until July, 1914.

On October 27, 1911, Cecil Lindo gave the Atlantic Fruit Company an option to purchase their banana plantations for $3,500,000 before August, 1912. Cecil was to be the General Manager of the Atlantic Fruit Company in Costa Rica.

The Atlantic Fruit Company could not or would not execute the option, and in 1912, the Lindo properties were sold to United Fruit Company for $5,000,000.

By 1913, the Lindo brothers were owners of vast sugar, coffee and cocoa estates, lumber and flour mills, breweries, ice-making and aerated factories. Their agricultural interests included 1,000 acres of sugar, 2,000 acres of cacao and 7,000 acres of Coffee plantations, exporting three millions pounds of coffee each year, with an approximate value of half a million dollars.

=== Jamaica ===
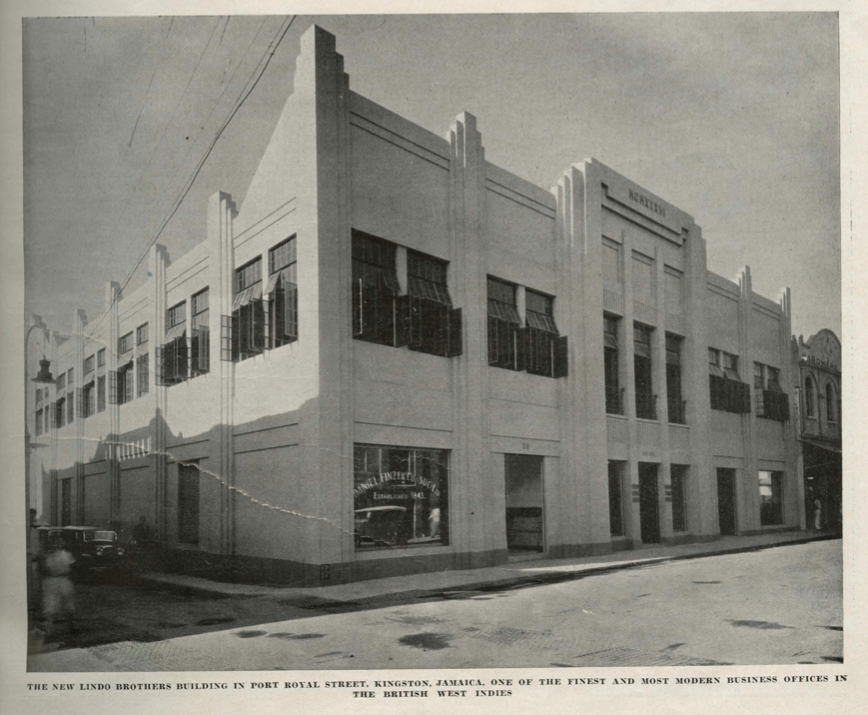
Lindo Brothers & Co. office on Port Royal Street in Kingston

By 1911, Percy owned several thousand acres of land in the Oracabessa area. That year he sold a property to Ruth Bryan Owen, which she named Golden Clouds.

In 1914, Lindo Bros. & Co. Ltd. was formed in Jamaica and Percy was appointed the resident manager.

The company began by purchasing properties along north coast of the island to plant bananas in conjunction with their cousins, the deLisser Brothers.

In 1916 they purchased the entire estate of Colonel Charles Ward, which included J. Wray and Nephew Ltd. and large estates in Saint Catherine and Clarendon.

The next year Appleton Estate in Saint Elizabeth and Cornwall in Westmoreland were purchased by the company.

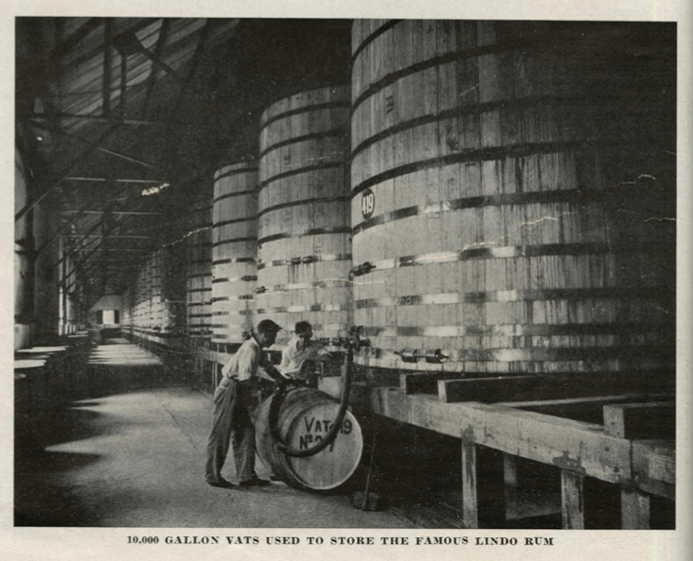
10,000 Gallon Vats used to store the Lindo rum

They expanded factory and distillery operations, adding additional warehouses to store and age the rums, a bottle washing machine and an electric bottling line. International distribution deals were made on behalf of the company with Schieffelin & Co. of New York and EA de Pass & Co. of London.

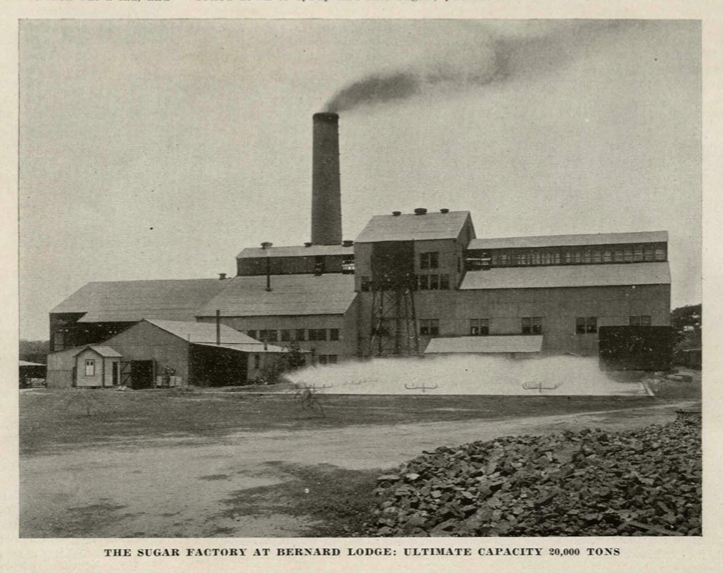
Bernard Lodge Sugar Factory

In 1925 the Lindo Bros & Co., in partnership with Allan Keeling, invested £1,000,000 in the establishment of the Bernard Lodge Central Sugar Factory.

In 1928, the Lindo Bros sold 56,600 acres of land in Jamaica to the United Fruit Company for £2,000,000, which at the time, was the largest transaction in the history of the island. That year Lindo Brothers acquired the wharf and office premises of the Atlantic Fruit Company on King Street.

Percy was an appointed as a Member of the Legislative Council from 1930-42. He was a director of the Jamaica Mutual Life Assurance Society and the Jamaica Imperial Association.

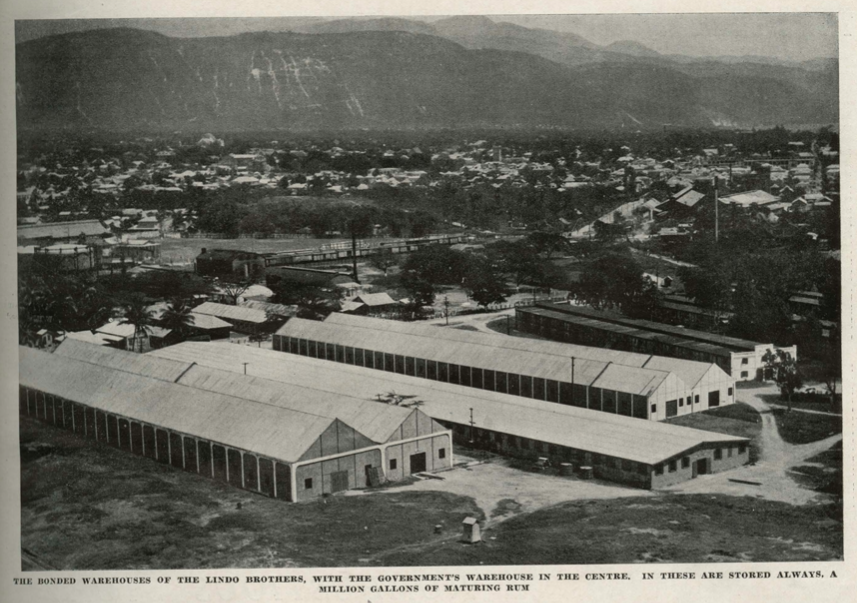
The bonded warehouses of Lindo Brothers

In 1937, Cecil Lindo told a journalist: "I have one million gallons of rum stored. When any quantity of the matured rums is taken out, the stock is immediately replenished."

In 1939, Lindo Bros & Co. sold J. Wray and Nephew Ltd. and Appleton Estate to Percy Lindo.

After much experimentation, the first Appleton Estate branded rums were launched in 1944. The rums were light, fragrant and meant to serve as a substitute for whiskey, which was hard to come by during World War II. That year the Mai Tai was invented using J.Wray & Nephew 17 year old by Victor Bergeron of Trader Vic's.

== Personal life ==
He married Hilda Violet Lindo in 1903 in Kingston. The couple had four children: Delores, Roy, Blanche and Frederick Cecil Lindo.

The family lived at Cecilio Lodge, now St Andrew High School while constructing Royston, now Campion College, Jamaica.
