= EduFocal =

Educational website

EduFocal Limited
- Company type: Private
- Website type: Social Learning
- Available in: English
- Headquarters: Kingston, Jamaica, {{{location_country}}}
- Area served: Jamaica
- Founders: Gordon Swaby, Paul Allen
- Key people: Gordon Swaby, CEO/Founder; Paul Allen, Lead Developer
- Employees: approx. 15
- Website: edufocal.com
- Registration: Required
- Launched: March 15, 2012
- Current status: Active

EduFocal is a social learning website for Primary Exit Profile (PEP) students in Jamaica and Caribbean Secondary Education Certificate (CSEC) students in the Caribbean. The service uses gamification to present its test material to students on the service.

== Partnerships ==
In December 2012, the company entered into a partnership with The Jamaica Observer to offer free access to the service through the purchase of a Sunday Observer. The partnership also saw EduFocal expanding its content base to offer not only questions and answers for subjects, but reading content material from the Observer's Study Centre publication.

== Awards ==
- In 2011, EduFocal's logo won an award from Graphic Design USA via branding company Tactic Marketing

== EduFocal Awards Event ==
The EduFocal Awards is an annual event by EduFocal that awards the top users on its service with cash and other prizes. The first event was held on July 1, 2013 at the Jamaica Pegasus in Kingston, Jamaica
