= Beer in Central America =

This article discusses beer in Central America.

== Countries ==
=== Belize ===
Belikin is the leading domestically produced beer brand in Belize. It is a light continental European style lager. The Belize Brewing Company holds a monopoly in the market and also brews a few other lagers and a stout. They are also a licensed brewer of Guinness Stout and carry several international brands.

=== Costa Rica ===
Cervecería de Costa Rica, a division of Florida Ice & Farm Co., is a global brewer and distributor. They are brewers of the Imperial, Pilsen, Bavaria, Rock Ice, Bohemia and Kaiser (non alcoholic) among other varieties and styles of the aforementioned beers. With the exception of Bavaria Dark, all are light-colored, light-bodied lagers.

Since 2010 a healthy craft beer industry has been growing year after year, as of 2015 more than 40 breweries exists in the country, and more than 100 different locally brewed beers are available. In 2022, there were around 200 micro-breweries.

From 2009 to 2014, total beer consumption in Costa Rica increased by 11.6%.

=== El Salvador ===
The Salvadoran beers are Pilsener Lager Bier (most prominent brand in the country), Golden Light, Regia "Extra" Lager and Suprema Premium Lager; all manufactured by Cervecevia La Constancia, a subsidiary of SABMiller. The only current competitor is Cadejo Brewing Company that its being the second major productor of craft beer, La Roja, La Negra, Guapa, La Mera Belga are manufactured by Cadejo Other international brands such as Heineken, Baltika or Corona are offered in the beer market, but also distributed (with lower sales) by the subsidiaries mentioned above.

=== Guatemala ===
The most famous beer is Gallo and its varieties Gallo Light and Chopp Gallo among others like Victoria, Dorada Light, Dorada Draft, Montecarlo and Moza all manufactured by Cervecería Centro Americana S.A. locally.

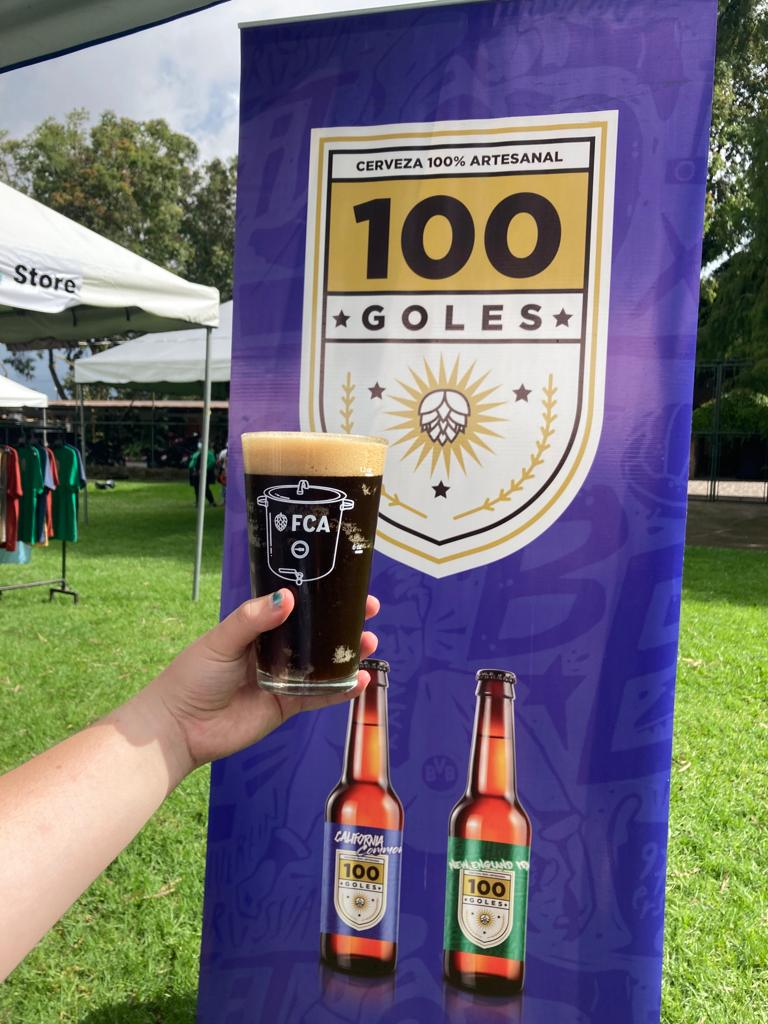
Cervecería 100 Goles selling beer at local beer festival (FCA).

Since 2016, the craft beer scene in Guatemala began. Currently, there are more than a dozen craft breweries in the country. Some of these being: Cervecería 100Goles, Quiscalus Cerveza Artesanal, Xamán, Quetzal Brewing Company, Ixbalanque Cervecería, and various others.

=== Honduras ===
The big Honduran beers are Salva Vida, Imperial, Port Royal and Barena. All four are owned by the Cerveceria Hondureña, owner of the Coca-Cola brand and other drinks. Salva Vida is a lager, Imperial is a dark pilsner, Port Royal (discontinued in 2023) is pilsner and Barena is a light pilsner. In 2013 a microbrewery named D&D Brewing Co. began distributing beer in San Pedro Sula, the industrial hub of the country. In 2016 Gecko Brewing Co.(http://www.geckobrewingco.com/) was established in San Pedro Sula as the first craft brewery in this city focused on draft beer production and distribution to restaurants, bars and hotels. Early 2019 Roatan Island Brewing Company ** Roatan Island Brewing Caribbean Crafted Ales & Lagers ** opened up on Roatan. Targeting both bars and restaurants on the island as well is open weekends for the public. Occasionally also hosts artisan markets.

=== Nicaragua ===
Lagers: Toña and Premium. Pilsen: Victoria, Victoria Light and Victoria Frost. All manufactured by the Compañía Cervecera de Nicaragua.

=== Panama ===
Cerveza Panama, Soberana, Cristal, Cerveza Atlas and Balboa; all light body and pale lagers. Also manufactured under license locally other foreign marks how Heineken or Budweiser. see Beers of Panama for details.
