= Germans in Jamaica =

Germans in Jamaica Deutsche siedlung in Jamaika
Regions with significant populations
- Westmoreland, Trelawny

Languages
- Jamaican English, German

Religion
- Seventh-day Adventist

Related ethnic groups
- Other Germans, other White Jamaicans

Germans in Jamaica or German Jamaicans, are Jamaicans of German ancestry. The population was established in the 1830s when the abolition of slavery resulted in a labour shortage on the Caribbean island. Lord Seaford, who owned the Montpelier Estate and Shettlewood Pen in St. James established a European settlement in Westmoreland in order to combat the shortage, and over one thousand Germans migrated to Jamaica.

The German language is no longer used on the island, but some German words have entered the Jamaican vernacular. Many Jamaicans in Seaford and German Town in Trelawney carry heavy European features such as blue eyes, blond hair, freckles and white skin, as a result of the German genetic influences.

== Notable people ==
- Supa Dups
- Sharlene Radlein
- Julian Radlein
- George Stiebel
- Thomas J. Goreau, biogeochemist and marine biologist
- Herbert Eldemire, politician
