= Blanche Blackwell =

Jamaican heiress (1912–2017)

- Born: Blanche Lindo; 9 December 1912; San José, Costa Rica
- Died: 8 August 2017 (aged 104); London, England
- Spouse: Middleton Joseph Blackwell (m. 1936; div. 1949)
- Children: Chris Blackwell
- Father: Percy Lindo
- Family: Lindo

Blanche Blackwell (née Lindo; 9 December 1912 – 8 August 2017) was a Jamaican heiress, mother of Chris Blackwell, and an inspirational muse to Ian Fleming and Noël Coward.

== Early life ==
Blanche Lindo was born on 9 December 1912 in San José, Costa Rica, the second daughter and third child (of four) of Percy Lindo and Hilda Violet (née Lindo) Lindo. Lindo was a product of cousin marriage. Both her mother and father were descendants of the Lindo family, a Sephardi Jewish family originally from Portugal who suffered persecution for their religion, and so became New Christians.

Blackwell's ancestor, Alexandre Lindo, would go on to settle in Kingston, Jamaica in the 18th century and he and his descendants would make their fortune as merchants, financiers, and planters.

Blanche Lindo was educated in Kingston by a private tutor until, at sixteen, she was sent to Garrett Hall to further her studies. She married Middleton Joseph Blackwell, of the Crosse & Blackwell fortune, in 1936 and their only child, Christopher, was born the following year. The couple divorced in 1949.

== Relationship with Ian Fleming ==
During her life, Blackwell became known for her role as friend, mistress, and muse to Ian Fleming, who lived nearby in Jamaica. On first meeting Fleming at a dinner party in 1956, the two did not immediately hit it off, but their friendship developed into a deeper and creative one. She was often invited to Fleming's home, where she enjoyed snorkeling on his reef.

Fleming's marriage to Ann Charteris had suffered, owing in part to her disapproval of the James Bond novels, and she was often away from the couple's home in Jamaica. Blackwell is believed by some to have been the inspiration for some of Fleming's most memorable female characters, such as Pussy Galore and Honeychile Ryder. Her brother, Roy Lindo, sold land to Fleming and Coward for their Jamaican houses.

Blackwell became friends with prominent figures and celebrities of the time, including Errol Flynn, whom she met when he was holidaying in Jamaica. She continued to be involved with her son's life and work, hosting parties and giving advice.

== Death ==
Blanche Blackwell died in London on 8 August 2017 at the age of 104.
