= Gordon Swaby =

Jamaican businessperson (born 1990)

Gordon Obrien Swaby
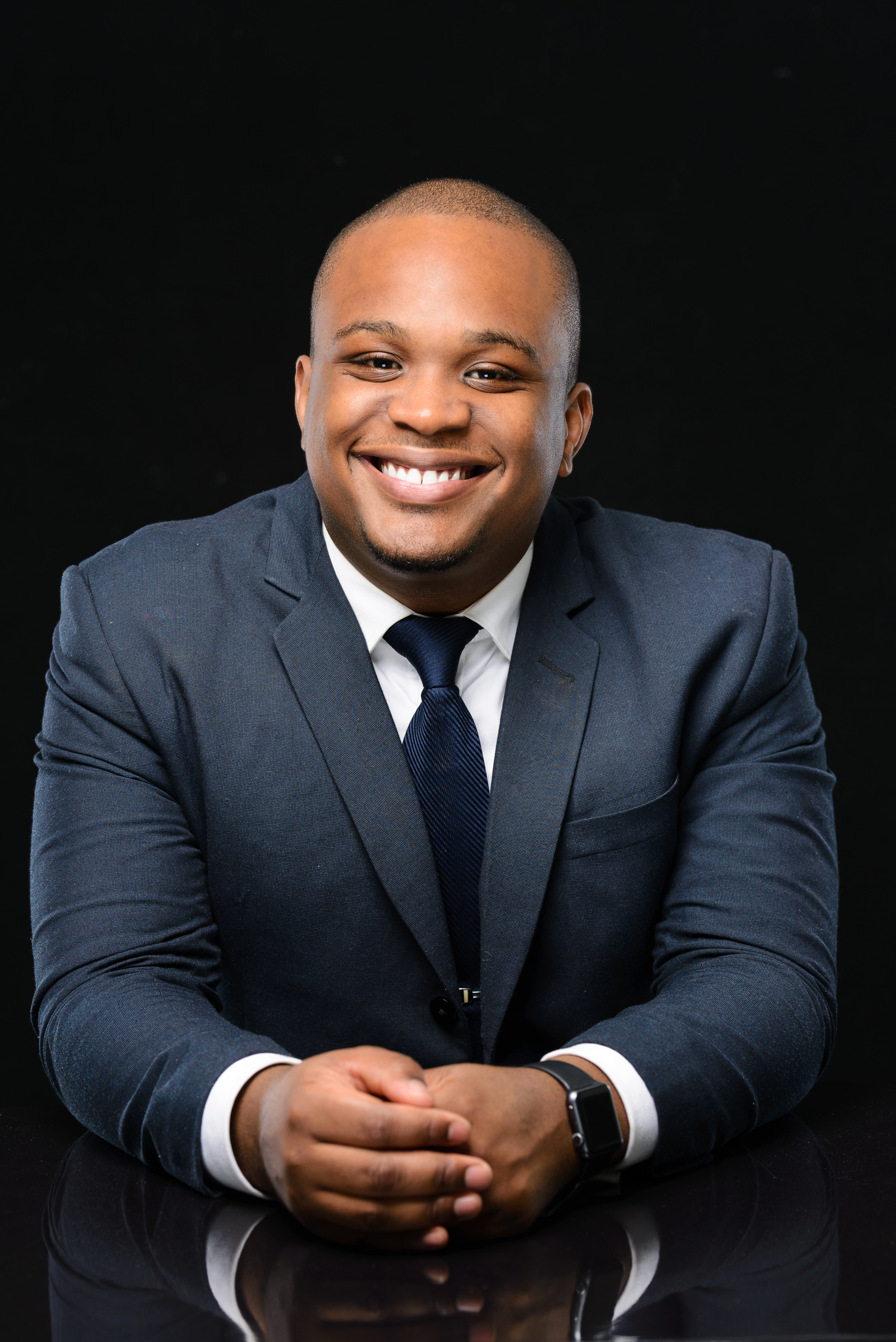
- Self-portrait photograph
- Born: 18 November 1990 (age 35); Mandeville, Manchester, Jamaica
- Occupation: internet entrepreneur
- Known for: Founder of Advance-Gamers, EduFocal Limited and EduFocal Business
- Website: gordonswaby.com

Gordon Obrien Swaby (born 18 November 1990) is an internet entrepreneur based in Kingston, Jamaica. He is the CEO/Founder of EduFocal Limited an E-Learning web application for students at the CXC and PEP level.

Swaby was also the founder of the now defunct website Advance-Gamers; a large gaming website in the Caribbean at the time.

Swaby is an inductee of the Branson Centre of Entrepreneurship in the Caribbean.

== Awards ==
Swaby is a Private Sector Organization of Jamaica (PSOJ) Jamaica Gleaner 50underFifty business leader awardee. An award he won in 2012. In 2014, Gordon was named by the Inter-American Development Bank as one of ten innovators in the Latin America and Caribbean Region.
