= Scottish Jamaicans =

Jamaicans of Scottish descent

Scottish Jamaicans are Jamaicans of Scottish descent. Scottish Jamaicans include those of European, mixed African, and Asian ancestry with Scottish ancestors and date back to the earliest period of post-Spanish European colonisation.

An early influx of Scots came in 1656 when Oliver Cromwell deported 1200 prisoners of war. There was also a later migration at the turn of the 18th century, after the failed Darien colony in Panama. In 1707, Scots gained access to England's preexisting colonies when the Act of Union took place.

== History ==
Many Scots owned Black slaves in Jamaica. Scottish plantations also employed enslaved Scottish Gypsies who were expelled from Britain.

== People of Scottish Jamaican descent ==
- Alison Hammond, British TV celebrity
- Akala, British rapper and poet
- Harry Belafonte, American musician
- William Davidson, radical
- Paul Douglas (Grammy Award-winning drummer and bandleader of Toots and The Maytals)
- Ms. Dynamite, British singer and rapper
- Stewart Faulkner, British retired athlete of Jamaican and Cuban parentage
- Salena Godden, poet and author of Jamaican Irish parentage, descendant of Scottish ancestor Lieutenant General James Robinson (1762–1845) who is buried at Edinburgh University.
- Goldie, British disc jockey of Scottish and Jamaican parentage
- Harry J, record producer
- Lewis Hutchinson, Scottish immigrant to Jamaica; owned a castle; one of Jamaica's first known serial killers
- Colin Powell, American general, of Scottish Jamaican parentage
- Mary Seacole, nurse during the Crimean War; her father was a Scottish soldier
- Gil Heron, Jamaican football player
- Gil Scott-Heron, American soul and jazz poet
- Edward Seaga, prime minister
- Robert Wedderburn, radical and abolitionist

== See also ==
- Scottish place names in Jamaica
- Scottish colonization of the Americas
- Tobacco Lords
- White Jamaicans
