= Jamaica Observer =

Daily newspaper in Jamaica

- Type: Daily newspaper
- Owner(s): ATL Group, Adam Stewart
- Founder: Butch Stewart
- Founded: January 1993
- Website: jamaicaobserver.com

The Jamaica Observer is a daily newspaper published in Kingston, Jamaica. It was established by hotelier and businessman Butch Stewart alongside Delroy Lindsay and Trinidadian politician Ken Gordon in January 1993 as a competitor to Jamaica's oldest daily paper, The Gleaner. The first full-colour newspaper in the Caribbean, its founding editor is Desmond Allen, who is its executive editor – operations. At the time, it became Jamaica's fourth national newspaper.

== History ==
The Jamaica Observer began as a weekly newspaper on March 7, 1993, before transitioning to twice-weekly in June 1993 and to daily publication on December 11, 1994. It is the first full-colour newspaper in the Caribbean. The paper moved to larger facilities on Beechwood Avenue in Kingston as part of its tenth anniversary celebrations in 2004.

Desmond Allen who came from the Jamaica Daily News, described Stewart's vision: "For Butch, Jamaica was too sophisticated and dynamic to be a "one-newspaper society." He regarded the Observer as a gift to Jamaica, charging the staff to produce a different type of journalism that was focussed on mirroring the best of Jamaicans to themselves and to celebrate the daily heroism of the ordinary people." In 1995, the paper published a series of nine anonymous letters to the editor criticising the Jamaican government for awarding Stewart the Order of Jamaica.

== Transition of leadership ==
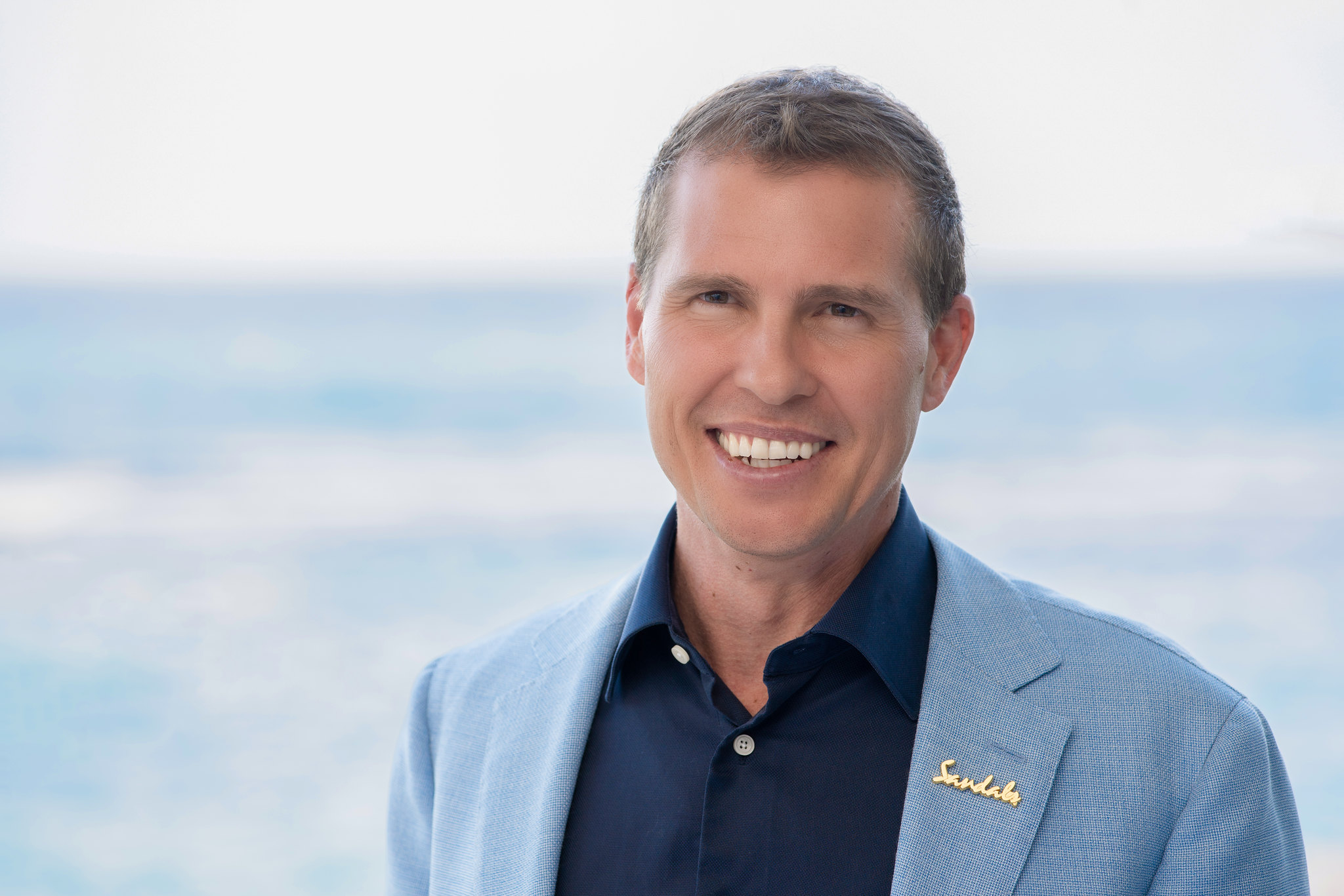
Adam Stewart in 2022

Following the death of the founder, Butch Stewart, on January 4, 2021, his son, Adam Stewart, took the role of executive chairman of the Jamaica Observer. He now oversees the media group as part of his leadership of the ATL Group and Sandals Resorts International.
