= Campion College, Jamaica =

Public Catholic school in Kingston, Jamaica

Campion College

Location
- 105 Hope Road; Kingston, Surrey, St. Andrew, KGN 6 Jamaica
- Coordinates: 18°01′08″N 76°46′16″W

Information
- Type: Public, Catholic secondary school
- Motto: Latin: Fortes In Fide Et Opere; English: Steadfast in Faith and Work
- Religious affiliation: Roman Catholic
- Patron saint: Edmund Campion
- Founded: 5 January 1960; 66 years ago
- Founder: Samuel Emmanuel Carter, SJ
- Oversight: Ministry of Education
- Chairman: Anton Thompson
- Principal: Dr. Lavare Henry
- Gender: Co-educational
- Average class size: 34 students
- Houses: Loyola; Xavier; Gonzaga; Regis; Kostka; Bellarmine
- Colours: Red and White
- Nickname: Campionite, Crocs
- Website: www.campioncollege.com

Campion College is a public Catholic secondary school, located in Kingston, Jamaica. The co-educational school was founded by the Society of Jesus in 1960.

The school is one of the top three choices for PEP exams and is widely considered to be a prominent educational facility due to its numerous top placements in academics for the Caribbean Secondary Education Certificate (CSEC) and the Caribbean Advanced Proficiency Examinations (CAPE).

== History ==
In 1960, with one hundred and one first form students and a faculty of four Jesuit Fathers, the new school opened its doors and the first lessons were given that day in a pavilion and classrooms borrowed from Campion Hall Preparatory School. The Jesuit faculty residence was the former residence of the Jesuit Superior of the Island, Campion House. Campion Hall had been founded in January 1940 when Rt. Reverend Thomas A. Emmet, SJ, DD, was Vicar Apostolic of Jamaica and V. Reverend Thomas J. Feeney, SJ was Superior. It began on the premises of St. George's College but moved to Roslyn Hall at 115 Old Hope Road on 6 January 1942. To make room for the growing needs of Campion College, it graduated its last class in December 1962, just as twenty-two years earlier it had taken in its first students to supply the needs of St. George's College. Campion House, the former Superior's residence at 105 Hope Road, was the property of Mr. Roy Lindo before it and the large adjoining field were sold to the Society of Jesus.

The ground was broken on 26 August 1960 for a £20,000 (British Currency) two-storey structure of eight classrooms with accommodation for 240 pupils. It was designed by McMorris & Sibley, Architects, and erected by the firm of Ivan D. Arscott. It was formally blessed on Monday, 20 March 1961 by the Rt. Reverend John J. McEleny, SJ, DD, Bishop of Kingston, and was dedicated to the memory of Martin A. Waters of Boston, Massachusetts, USA, whose bequest along with other benefactors made the erection possible.

In addition to Waters Hall and to the west of it, a second new building was erected. The 15,000 pound Science Block has laboratories and classrooms for physics, chemistry, and biology. Its construction, supervised by Leonard I. Change, was finished in December 1963 and opened for use in January 1964. The formal dedication and opening took place on 24 February 1964, when it was blessed by V. Rev. John V. O'Conner, SJ, New England Provincial of the Society of Jesus.

== Activities, sports, service ==
The school sponsors circa 60 clubs and societies and 15 different sports, including participation in all national sports competitions. A service project is required each term from each of the clubs, besides the following specifically service-oriented groups: Interact Club (branch of Rotary International), Ministry Outreach Group (visits indigent elderly), tutoring for primary school students, Teens for Change (mentoring at boys home), St. Anne's Programme (tutoring inner-city youth).

== See also ==
- Catholic Church in Jamaica
- Education in Jamaica
- List of Jesuit schools
