= Beaches Resorts =

All-inclusive resorts located in the Caribbean

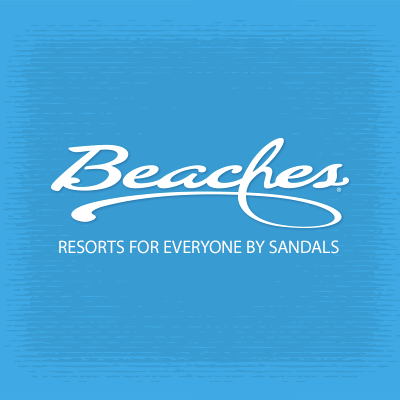
- Industry: Hospitality
- Founded: 1997; 29 years ago
- Founder: Gordon Stewart (Chairman)
- Headquarters: Turks & Caicos, Negril, Ocho Rios, Jamaica
- Number of locations: 2
- Area served: Caribbean
- Key people: Adam Stewart (Executive Chairman)
- Number of employees: 10,000+
- Parent: Sandals Resorts International (SRI)
- Website: www.beaches.com

Beaches Resorts is an operator of all-inclusive resorts for couples & families in the Caribbean, founded in 1997. Beaches Resorts and Sandals Resorts are part of Sandals Resorts International (SRI) which is a parent company to five resort brands across seven countries.

== Locations ==
As of 2025, Beaches Resorts operates two locations:

- Beaches Negril, located in Negril, Jamaica
- Beaches Turks & Caicos, located in Providenciales, Turks and Caicos Islands

A third resort, Beaches Ocho Rios, located in Ocho Rios, Jamaica, closed permanently on May 31, 2025. Sandals Resorts International, which owns the Beaches brand, announced the closure in April 2025. This location was the only property in their portfolio not company owned and leasing no longer aligned with their future plans

Four future Beaches Resorts are under development:

Beaches St. Vincent - This Beaches resort is to be built on the site of the former Buccament Bay Resort in Buccament Bay, Saint Vincent and The Grenadines.

Beaches Barbados - In 2013 Sandals purchased the former Almond Beach Village Resort in Barbados. The property stayed vacant until February 2025 when it was announced this will be developed into Beaches Barbados.

Beaches Runaway Bay - In 2020 Sandals purchased the former Jewel Dunn's River Beach Resort & Spa. As the property had a water park it was assumed that this would be developed as a Beaches resort. In 2025 this was confirmed to be developed into a Beaches Resort.

Beaches Exuma - Sandals closed their Sandals Emerald Bay location in August, 2024. It was announced at that time that the property would be converted to Beaches Exuma.

== Leadership ==
Gordon “Butch” Stewart (1941–2021) was the businessperson who founded and owned Beaches Resorts. Adam Stewart (1981-), the son of Gordon “Butch” Stewart, is the Executive Chairman of Sandals Resorts International (SRI). Gebhard Rainer stepped down as CEO in 2024.
