= Cecil Vernon Lindo =

Jamaican banker

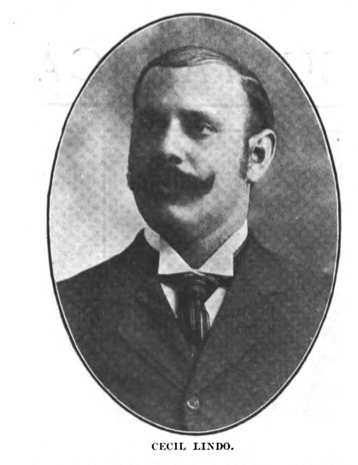
- Born: 1870; Falmouth, Jamaica
- Died: 1960 (aged 89–90); Devon House
- Father: Frederick Lindo
- Family: Lindo family

Cecil Vernon Lindo (1870 - 1960) was a Jamaican banker, industrialist, planter and philanthropist.

== Early life ==
Cecil Lindo was born in 1870, in Falmouth, Jamaica, to Frederick Lindo and Grace Morales, the sixth of ten children.

He migrated to Costa Rica from Jamaica at age 18. His older brothers, Howard, Abraham and Robert had arrived in 1885 to work for Minor Cooper Keith, who was building a railroad from Limon to San Jose. He worked as a paymaster from 1889 to 1891 for £2 per week.

== Career ==
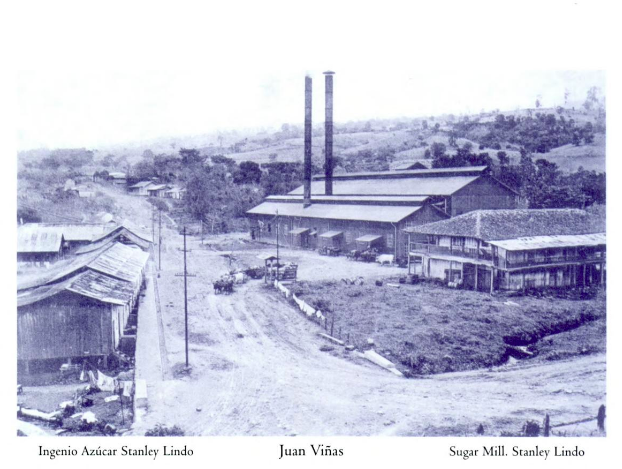
Lindo Sugar Factory at Juan Viñas

Cecil organised the Lindo brothers in 1891, starting with the purchase of a commissary at Matina from Minor Cooper Keith.

The brothers soon expanded, opening a store in Limón and planting bananas. In 1899, they opened a bank in Limon.

He was Vice Consul of the United Kingdom in Limón from 1896 to 1901.

In 1907, the brothers entered the coffee business, starting with the purchase of Juan Viñas, a vast sugar and coffee farm from Federico Tinoco Granados. They continued purchasing properties and soon became largest coffee and sugar producers in the country. In 1908, the brothers founded the Florida Ice and Farm Company.

By 1911, the Lindo properties were producing half of Costa Rica's bananas, and Joseph DiGiorgio, on behalf of the Atlantic Fruit Company, approached Lindo Bros with idea of purchasing all of their banana plantations, although the entire production was contracted to United Fruit Company until July, 1914.

On October 27, 1911, Cecil gave the Atlantic Fruit Company an option to purchase their banana plantations for $3,500,000 before August, 1912. Cecil was to be the General Manager of the Atlantic Fruit Company in Costa Rica.

The company could not or would not execute the option, and in 1912, the Lindo's was sold the properties to United Fruit Company that year for $5,000,000.

By 1913, the Lindo brothers were owners of vast sugar, coffee and cocoa estates, lumber and flour mills, breweries, ice-making and aerated factories. They operated 7,000 acres of Coffee plantations, which were producing and exporting three millions pounds of coffee each year, with an approximate value of half a million dollars.

=== Jamaica ===
In 1914, Lindo Bros & Co. Ltd. was formed and began to purchase large agricultural properties in Jamaica.

In 1916 Lindo Bros & Co. bought Appleton Estate and J. Wray and Nephew Ltd. in 1917.

In 1925 the Lindo Bros, in partnership with Allan Keeling, invested £1,000,000 in the establishment of the Bernard Lodge Central Sugar Factory.

In 1928, the Lindo Bros sold 56,600 acres of land St. Catherine & Clarendon to the United Fruit Company for £2,000,000, which at the time, was the largest transaction in the history of the island. That year Cecil purchased Devon House from Reginald Melhado.

In Who's Who in 1938 we are told his philanthropies were in the region of £60,000 annually in Jamaica alone.
