= Frederick Lindo =

Jamaican merchant

Frederick Manahem Lindo
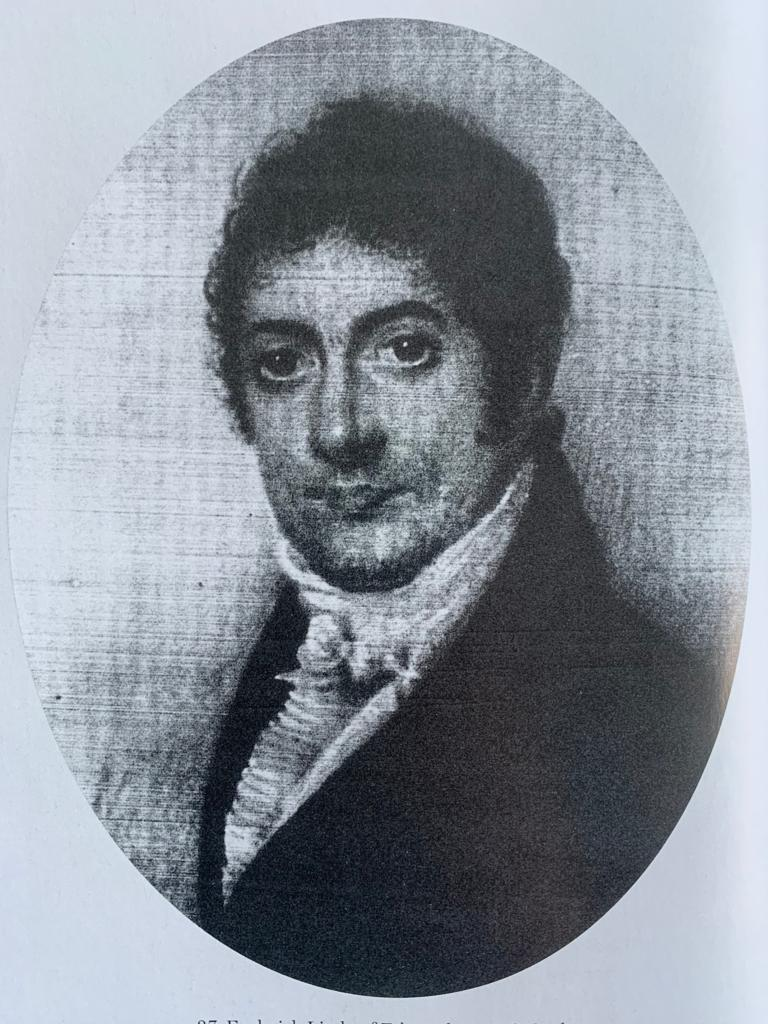
- Born: 1821; Kingston, Jamaica
- Died: 1882 (aged 60–61); Falmouth, Jamaica
- Children: 3, including Percy Lindo
- Father: Abraham Alexander Lindo

Frederick Lindo (1821-1882) was a Jamaican merchant, publisher and Member of the Legislative Council.

== Early life ==
Frederick Lindo was born in 1821 at Greenwich Park, Kingston to Abraham Alexander Lindo and Luna Henriques. He was the 7th of 14 children.

In 1825, at the age of 4, Frederick moved with his family to Mecklenburgh Square. His next stop at age 7 was the Isle of Wight and from there went to the Channel Islands. When he was 14 he moved to London again before returning to Jamaica in 1841. In 1846, he moved with his father to Cincinnati until his father's death in 1849.

== Career ==
Frederick's elder brothers: Alexander, Abraham and Henry has set themselves up as merchants trading under the name Lindo Brothers in Saint Mary and Trelawny Parish. In 1849, now aged 28, he returned from Cincinnati and joined Lindo Brothers firm in Falmouth, Trelawny, where they operated as importers and retailers.

Their businesses included the Fire Proof Store (provisions and estate supplies), Medical Hall (Druggist), Waterloo House (dry goods business), cigar and tinware factories and a newspaper called the Falmouth Post.

In 1855, the brothers sued Edward Moulton Barrett for negligence.

Frederick was a director of the Falmouth Water Co. and Vestryman for Trelawny.

In 1867, he launched the Trelawny Philharmonic Orchestra.

On 1 February 1867, Lindo Bros was dissolved and he opened a haberdashery, Frederick Lindo & Co., on Harbour Street in Kingston.

In the 1870s he served as a Member of the Legislative Council.

== Personal life ==
In 1858 he married Grace Morales, the daughter of Dr. Moses Morales and Louisa deLisser in Falmouth, Jamaica. The couple had ten children, including eight sons who formed Lindo Brothers & Co. in the late 19th century. Their children included:

- Augustus Abraham Lindo (1859-1948)
- Rupert Henry Lindo (1860-1946)
- Robert Benjamin Lindo (1861-1936)
- Howard Lindo (1863-
- Cecil Vernon Lindo (1870-1960)
- Oscar Lindo (1873-
- Stanley Alexander Lindo (1875-1958)
- Percival Henriques Lindo (1877-1946)
