= Devon House =

House in Kingston, Jamaica

Coordinates: 18°00′53″N 76°47′24″W

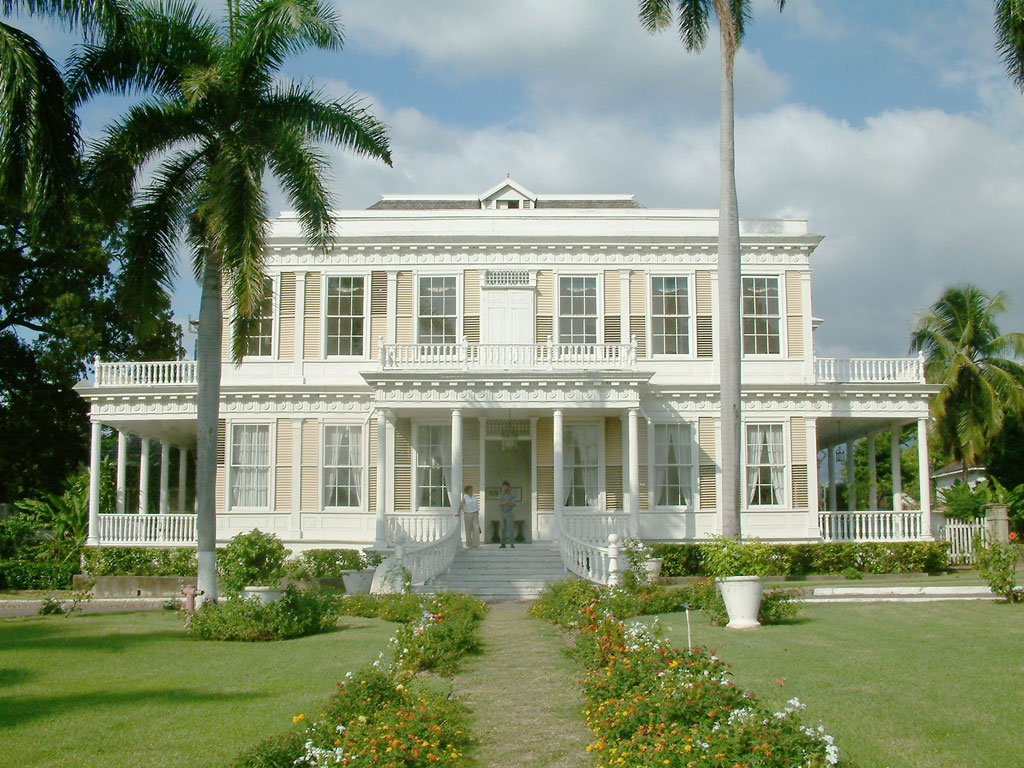
Devon House, St. Andrew

Devon House, built in 1881, is the former residence of George Stiebel (1820–1896), Jamaica's first millionaire of colour, in St. Andrew. He gained his wealth in Venezuela and returned to Jamaica. He was appointed as the Custos, a high civic post, of St. Andrew. His residence has been restored and is operated as a house museum and National Heritage Site.

The property was set to be demolished in 1965, until the government of Jamaica stepped in to purchase it.

== See also ==
- Tourism in Jamaica
