= Compañía Cervecera de Nicaragua =

Nicaraguan brewery

Compañía Cervecera de Nicaragua, S.A.
- Company type: Private
- Industry: Beverages
- Founded: March 18, 1876
- Headquarters: Managua, Nicaragua
- Products: Beers, lagers and soft drinks
- Website: Cerveceria.com.ni

Compañía Cervecera de Nicaragua (CCN) is a Nicaraguan brewery based in Managua, Nicaragua.

== History ==
On March 18, 1926, a group of Nicaraguan investors founded the Compañía Cervecera de Nicaragua. The first beer produced by the brewery was Cerveza Xolotlan in 1929, followed by the Pilsener and Carta Blanca brands a few years later. In 1942, with the restriction on imports on raw materials, CCN introduced the Cerveza Victoria brand.

In 1996, CCN merged with its competitor, the Industrial Cervecera, S.A. (ICSA), to form the largest brewery in Nicaragua. In 2003, CCN began exporting the Cerveza Toña brand to the U.S. market.

CCN acquired the local water bottling company Agua Pura, S.A. in 2002 and expanded its business to juices and flavored non-carbonated sports drinks.

== Products ==
=== Victoria ===
Victoria is a 4.9% pilsner introduced in 1942 and the oldest and one of the most popular beers in Nicaragua. It is sold in 350 ml (12 U.S. fl oz; 12 imp fl oz) bottles and aluminum cans, as well as 1 liter (34 U.S. fl oz; 35 imp fl oz) returnable bottles. It's also sold in half-barrel kegs.

Victoria Light, a softer version of the beer, was introduced in 2004. It is sold in 350 ml (12 U.S. fl oz; 12 imp fl oz) bottles and aluminum cans.

Victoria Frost is a 4.9% pilsner and the only beer in Nicaragua that is produced with a microfiltration process. It is sold in 350 ml (12 U.S. fl oz; 12 imp fl oz) bottles and aluminum cans, as well as 1 liter (34 U.S. fl oz; 35 imp fl oz) returnable bottles.

Victoria Selección Maestro is the first dark brew, it has a 5.1% alcohol content and was introduced as a seasonal item in 2011.

=== Toña ===
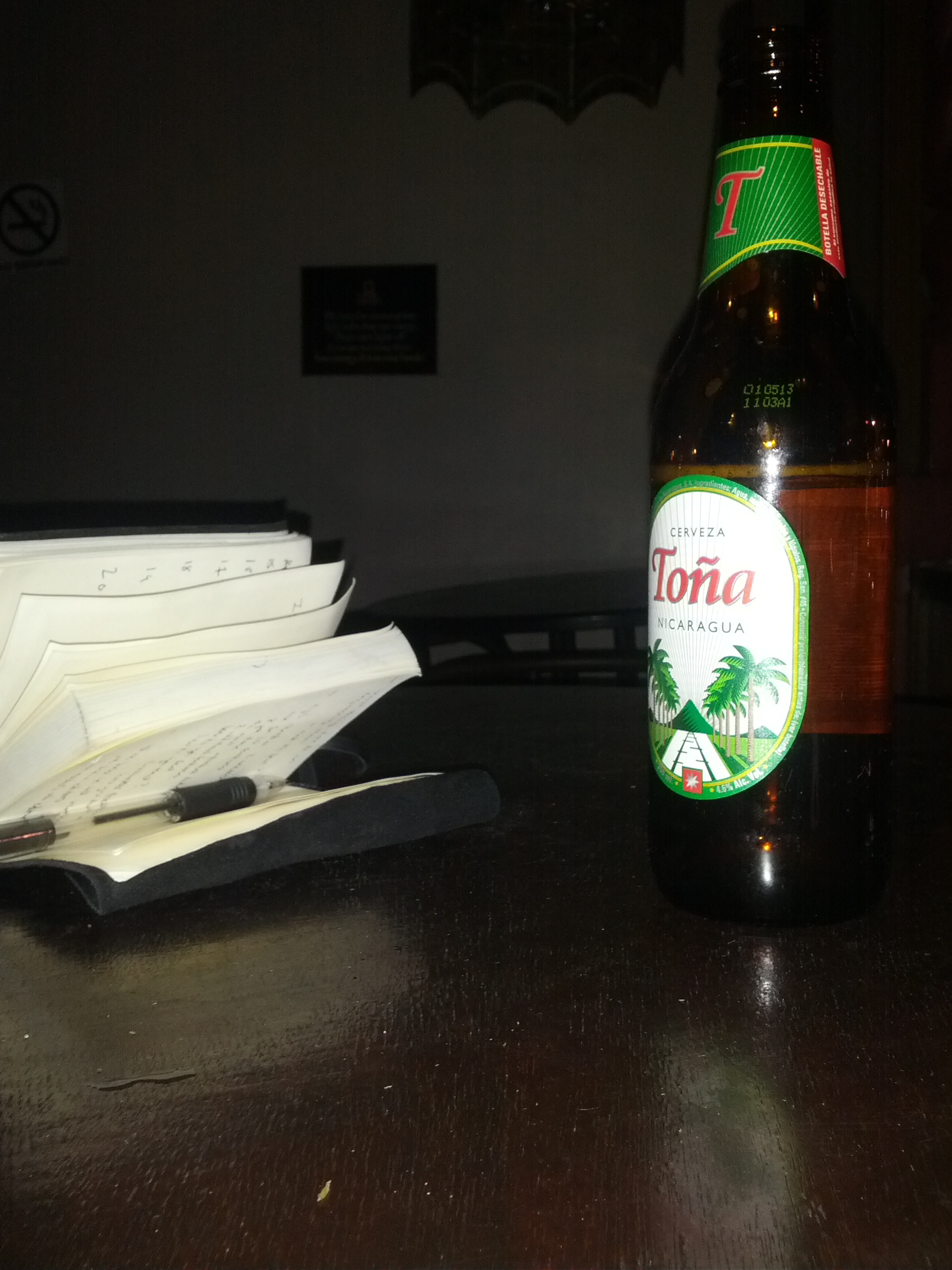
A bottle of Toña beer

Toña is a 4.6% lager introduced in 1977 by ICSA as a direct competitor of the Victoria brand. After the 1996 merge, CNN relaunched the Toña brand as a traditional Nicaraguan beer, often associated with the local culture and customs. It is sold in 350 ml (12 U.S. fl oz; 12 imp fl oz) bottles and aluminum cans, and in 1 liter (34 U.S. fl oz; 35 imp fl oz) returnable bottles.

=== Premium ===
Premium is a 4.5% lager introduced in 1999 and aimed at consumers who prefer imported brands. It is sold in 350 ml (12 U.S. fl oz; 12 imp fl oz) bottles.
