= Butch Stewart =

Jamaican businessman (1941–2021)

Butch Stewart OJ CD
- Born: Gordon Arthur Cyril Stewart; 6 July 1941; Kingston, Colony of Jamaica, British Empire
- Died: 4 January 2021 (aged 79); Miami, Florida, U.S.
- Occupations: Hotelier, businessman
- Known for: Founder, Sandals Resorts and Beaches Resorts
- Children: 8
- Awards: Order of Jamaica; Order of Distinction

Gordon Arthur Cyril "Butch" Stewart OJ CD (6 July 1941 – 4 January 2021) was a Jamaican hotelier and businessman. He was the founder, owner, and chairman of Sandals Resorts, Beaches Resorts, and their parent company Sandals Resorts International, as well as The ATL Group and its subsidiaries Appliance Traders and The Jamaica Observer.

== Early life ==
Gordon Arthur Cyril Stewart was born on 6 July 1941 in Kingston, Jamaica. He grew up along the country's north coast where he came to be known as "Butch", a nickname given to him by an American sailor. As a child, Stewart helped out at his mother's appliance dealership, and at 12, he bought a small canoe he used to catch fish and sell them to the local hotels. He then bought a larger boat which he operated until age 17.

== Career ==
After completing his education in England, Stewart became a salesman and eventually rose to become the sales manager of Dutch-owned Curaçao Trading Company. Stewart later left in 1968 to found his own business, Appliance Traders, Ltd. which specialized at first in importing and selling air conditioning units, water coolers, and stoves, but has grown to sell almost everything.

In April 1981, Stewart bought two derelict hotels, the Bay Roc and the Carlisle in Montego Bay. The Bay Roc had been abandoned for more than five years when Stewart hired architect Evan Williams to renovate the hotel for $4 million and reopen it the same year as the Sandals Resort Beach Club, later known as Sandals Montego Bay. Stewart founded Sandals Resorts. Stewart is credited with several innovations in the hospitality industry, most notably building the Caribbean's first swim-up bar at Sandals Montego Bay Resort in Jamaica in 1984.

In 1985, Stewart opened his second hotel as the Sandals Carlisle which was followed the next year by Sandals Royal Caribbean, “the only resort in Jamaica with its own private island". Over the next few years, Stewart expanded Sandals Resort to Negril in 1988 and to Ocho Rios in 1989. In 1991, he opened a second resort in Ocho Rios near the Dunn's River Falls and also opened Sandals Antigua, his first resort outside Jamaica. He added two more resorts to the Sandals chain in Saint Lucia, Sandals La Toc and Sandals Halcyon Beach, which opened in 1993. Sandals Royal Bahamian in Nassau opened in 1996 and, in 1997, Stewart started a second resort chain geared towards children and families with the opening of a Beaches Resort in Providenciales, Turks and Caicos Islands.

Stewart also founded The Jamaica Observer newspaper in January 1993 and, in 1994, started the Air Jamaica Acquisition Group to buy a majority stake in Air Jamaica. The group paid $37.5 million for a majority share of the airline; of which, Stewart held a 46 percent stake and became the new chairman of Air Jamaica. Stewart's group sold their shares of the airline back to the Jamaican Government in 2004.

In November 2006, Stewart became chairman of Sandals and Beaches Resorts after appointing his son Adam Stewart as CEO. In 2012, Stewart founded Sandals Corporate University, an adult education program for Caribbean nationals employed by Sandals Resorts, Beaches Resorts and Grand Pineapple Beach Resorts, provided in partnership by Canada-based Ryerson University, Western Hospitality Institute of Jamaica, and the Jamaica Foundation for Life Long Learning. As of 2012, Stewart's businesses employed more than 10,000 people in the Caribbean across various industries including hospitality, restaurant, automotive, retail, and media.

== Personal life ==
Stewart had eight children; one of his sons, Jonathan, was killed in a car crash in 1990. His son Brian Jardim sat on the board of The Jamaica Observer and is the owner of Rainforest Seafoods. His daughter Jamie Stewart-McConnell co-founded the juice company Orijin of Jamaica. His eldest son Robert “Bobby” Stewart held various leadership positions at Sandals including running the company's online division and UK operations. Adam Stewart was deputy chairman of Sandals, CEO of The ATL Group and founded the Sandals Foundation while CEO of Sandals Resorts from 2006 to 2012.

Stewart lived in Kingston and Montego Bay, Jamaica, with his girlfriend Cheryl, the mother of his younger three children: a set of twins, Kelly and Gordon, and a daughter, Sabrina.

=== Death ===
Stewart died in Miami, Florida, United States, on 4 January 2021 at the age of 79. He had been suffering from an undisclosed illness. A private funeral service was held.

== Honours and awards ==
Stewart received several accolades and awards including Jamaica's highest national distinctions: Order of Jamaica, and Commander of the Order of Distinction. He received honorary Doctor of Laws degrees from the University of the West Indies (2001) and from the University of Technology, Jamaica (2009). He also received an honorary Doctor of Business Administration degree from Johnson & Wales University in 2011.

In 1992, Stewart was presented with the Dr Martin Luther King Jr Humanitarian Award from the Jamaica–America Society. Ernst & Young voted him Master Entrepreneur of the decade of the 90s. Stewart was a Paul Harris Fellow, Rotary International's highest award. At the 2000 World Travel Awards, he was voted "Travel Man of the Millennium" for his work in promoting Caribbean tourism. In 2011, The Caribbean American Foundation presented Stewart with the Golden Eagle Humanitarian Award in recognition of his philanthropic contributions to education and entrepreneurship in the Caribbean. In 2014 Stewart was honored with the Most Innovative All-Inclusive Resort Executive by the Travalliance Travvy Awards, Hotelier of the Year at the Cacique Award held by the Bahamas Ministry of Tourism and Aviation and the Invest Caribbean Now Leadership Award presented at its global summit.

Stewart was a recipient of Caribbean World Magazine's Lifetime Achievement Award for his work in Jamaica, and was referred to as one of Jamaica's most-admired businessmen by Kamal King, President of Cambridge College and Community Services Jamaica, in an address to graduating students.

He earned Lifetime Achievement Awards from The American Academy of Hospitality Sciences, Travel Weekly and Globe Travel Awards.
