= Adam Stewart (business executive) =

Jamaican businessman (born 1981)

Adam Stewart CD
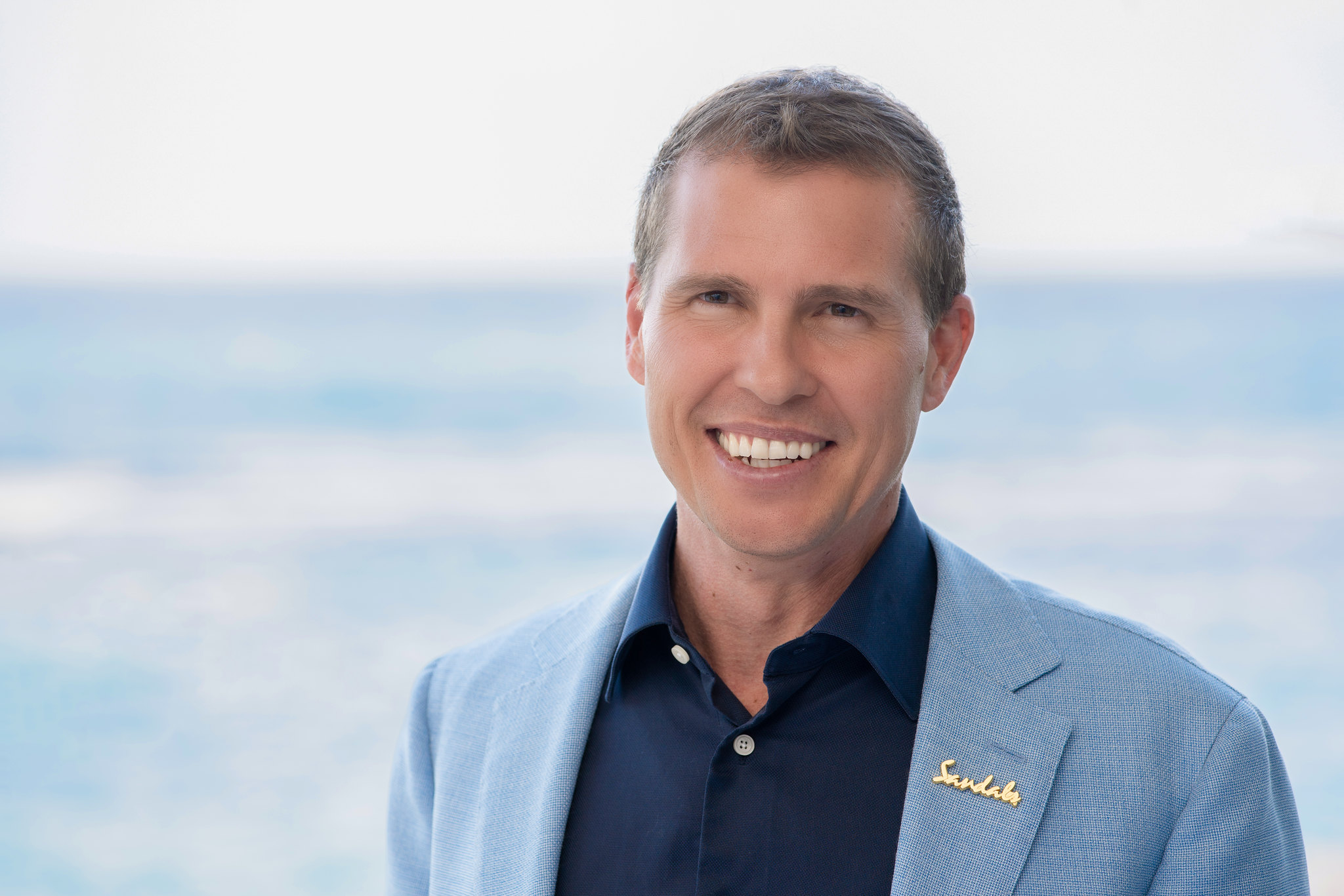
- Stewart in 2022
- Born: Adam Mark Stewart; January 27, 1981 (age 45); Kingston, St. Andrew, Jamaica
- Education: Florida International University
- Years active: 2003–present
- Employers: Sandals Resorts; Beaches Resorts
- Title: At Sandals Resorts: Executive Chairman (2009–present)
- Board member of: Beaches Resorts; Sandals Resorts; ATL Group; Jamaica Tourist Board
- Spouse: Jill Stewart (m. 2009; died 2023)
- Children: 3
- Father: Gordon "Butch" Stewart

Adam Mark Stewart (born January 27, 1981) is a Jamaican businessman who has been the executive chairman of the Sandals Resorts and Beaches Resorts since 9 January 2021. He has also been the president of the Sandals Foundation and executive chairman of the ATL Group, a Jamaica-based automotive, commercial and domestic appliance distributor. Stewart founded Island Routes Caribbean Adventures.

The University of the West Indies (The UWI) has listed Stewart for an Honorary Doctor of Laws degree for his family's contributions to the tourism and travel industry throughout the Caribbean. He sits on the executive committee of the World Travel & Tourism Council (WTTC), and was appointed as an Ambassador and Special Investment Envoy for Jamaica in 2023.

== Early life ==
Stewart was born on January 27, 1981, in Kingston, Jamaica, the same year that late his father, Gordon "Butch" Stewart purchased his first hotel and launched the Sandals Resorts chain.

Stewart was raised in Jamaica. He attended high school at St. Andrew's School in Boca Raton where he met his late wife, Jill. He graduated from Florida International University's Hospitality Management Program in Miami, Florida.

== Sandals Resort International ==
Stewart was appointed chief executive officer, of Sandals Resorts International in 2006 and deputy chairman in 2009. Under his leadership, SRI has witnessed the addition of the Italian and Key West Villages at the company's flagship Beaches Turks & Caicos Resort Villages & Spa, and the launch of Sandals Emerald Bay in the Bahamas, a 245-room resort with a 150-slip marina and Greg Norman golf course, in February 2010.

In 2013, SRI opened two Resorts in new island locations: Sandals Barbados and Sandals La Source Grenada.

In August 2016, Stewart was conferred upon the Order of Distinction (Commander Class) for outstanding service to tourism and the hotel sector.

In December 2017, SRI opened Sandals Royal Barbados.

In June 2022, Sandals opened its 16th resort in Curaçao, Sandals Royal Curaçao, followed by the reopening and modernization of Sandals Dunn's River in 2023. SRI announced plans to expand to the island of Saint Vincent and the Grenadines in Spring 2024.

== Island Routes Adventure Tours ==
In 2009, Stewart launched Island Routes Adventure Tours, offering excursions throughout the region. Island Routes has since grown from a small island outpost to a multiple World Travel Award-winning company of 200 people offering hundreds of adventures in 12 islands with the enviable title of the Caribbean's leading Tour Company in just three years.

In 2023, Island Routes was named the 'World's Leading Caribbean Adventure Tour Company' by the World Travel Awards for the twelfth consecutive year.

== The ATL Group ==
In August 2009, Adam Stewart was appointed as CEO and deputy chairman of the family-owned ATL Group comprising the Jamaica Observer, and ATL Appliance Traders, a chain of domestic and commercial appliance outlets combining distributorship of electronic brands in Jamaica. In June 2023, ATL Automotive was named Regional Master Dealer for 'Build Your Dreams' new energy vehicles, obtaining sale and aftersale rights in Jamaica, and a regional management role in 8 other countries throughout the Caribbean.

He was appointed to the position of executive chairman of ATL group in 2021.

=== ATL Automotive ===
In 2010, Stewart launched ATL Automotive. ATL Automotive incorporates sales and service centres located in Kingston and Montego Bay offering sales and service of Audi, Volkswagen, Honda, Jaguar, Land Rover and Range Rover automobiles.

In April 2015, ATL Automotive announced the termination of its Jaguar and Land Rover distributorship in order to focus on new brands that would better complement the company's growth strategy.

In January 2016, ATL Automotive signed an agreement to become Regional Master Dealers for BMW and MINI in Jamaica and eight countries throughout the Caribbean. The regional appointment, a first ever for a Jamaican automotive company, followed a nine-month tender process that saw ATL Automotive overcome international bids from across Europeans and the Americas.

In March 2016, the ATL Automotive Group announced an exclusive partnership to bring German carmaker Porsche to Jamaica.

== Caribbean Coffee Traders Limited ==
On May 4, 2017, it was announced that Starbucks had entered into a licensing agreement with Caribbean Coffee Traders Limited (CCTL), providing rights to own and operate Starbucks stores in Jamaica. Caribbean Coffee Traders Limited is a joint venture between Ian Dear, chief executive officer of Margaritaville Caribbean Group area franchise of Jimmy Buffett's Margaritaville and Stewart.

Starbucks opened its first store on the island in Montego Bay, St James on November 21, 2017. The company as well as local license Caribbean Coffee Baristas Limited have plans to roll out a further 14 stores in Jamaica by 2020.

== Office titles ==
- Chief Executive Officer of Sandals Resorts (2009–2021)
- Deputy Chairman, Sandals Resorts International (SRI): 2009 – January 2021
- Executive Chairman of Sandals Resorts: January 2021 –

== Awards ==
- In 2010, Stewart was awarded Caribbean World's Travel and Tourism Personality of the Year
- In 2010, Stewart was awarded the Distinguished Alumni Torch Award from FIU
- In 2012, Stewart was awarded The Gleaners Jamaica 50 Under 50 Award
- In 2012, Stewart was awarded the World Travel Awards Rising Star
- In June 2015, Stewart was named Hotelier of the Year 2014/2015 by the Jamaica Hotel and Tourism Association
- On October 4, 2015, Stewart was named the Caribbean Hotel and Tourism Associations Hotelier of the Year 2015
- On October 16, 2015, Stewart was named the Caribbean Personality of the Year 2015 at the Caribbean World Travel & Living Awards
- In August 2016, Stewart was appointed as a member of the Order of Distinction (Commander Class) for outstanding service to tourism and the hotel sector
- In September 2017, Stewart was presented with the Caribbean Tourism Associations Jerry Award for individuals contributing to Caribbean development
- In September 2021, Stewart received the Pacesetter Award from the Travel Allies Society in recognition of people served
- On November 5, 2022, Stewart was conferred with an honorary Doctor of Laws degree by the University of West Indies
- In May 2023, Stewart was appointed Ambassador and Special Investment Envoy for Tourism in Jamaica by the Prime Minister of Jamaica, Andrew Holness
- On November 2, 2023, Stewart was named 'Executive of the Year' at the ninth annual Travvy Awards
- In 2024, Stewart was named a "Changemaker" in the Hospitality Leadership Category at the Skift IDEA Awards

== The Sandals Foundation and philanthropy ==
In 2009, Stewart founded the Sandals Foundation. As the philanthropic arm of SRI, the Sandals Foundation donates to Caribbean communities through environmental, educational, and community projects, with 100% of every dollar donated directed towards funding initiatives.

In 2012, Stewart also founded and currently sits as Chairman of the We Care Foundation, a local non-profit organisation that brings together Montego Bay-based individuals to raise funds and improve the facilities of the nearby Cornwall Regional Hospital.

In 2012, Stewart established an internationally accredited private sector educational institute, Sandals Corporate University, which promotes distance learning in the Caribbean.

In 2013, Sandals Foundation provided a US$50,000 donation to the Caribbean-SickKids Paediatric Cancer and Blood Disorders project with the objective of improving outcomes for children affected by cancers and serious blood disorders in the Caribbean. Additionally, Adam Stewart was named ambassador of the project.

In 2022, the Sandals Foundation partnered with Netherlands's AJAX football team to launch the Future Goals Program, which converts fishing nets sourced from the ocean and recycled plastic waste into soccer goals for children.

As of 2022, the Foundation raised $79 million in funding for projects across the Caribbean.

Business positions
New title	Executive Chairman of Sandals Resorts; 2021	Incumbent
