= George Stiebel =

19th century Jamaican businessman

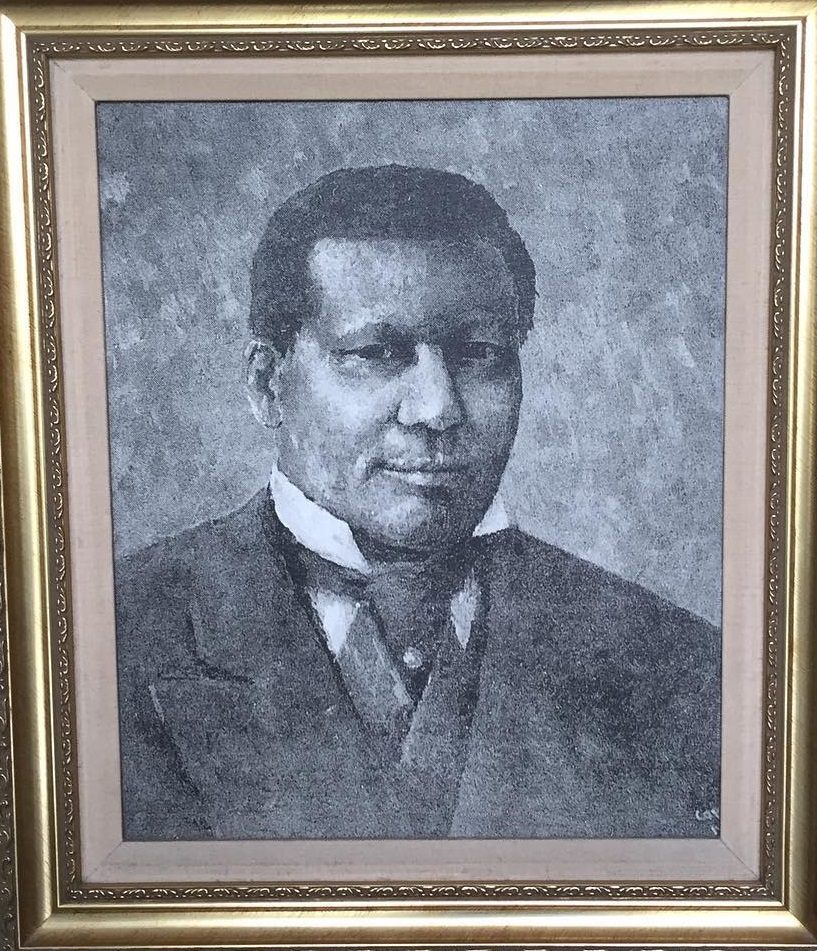
George Stiebel

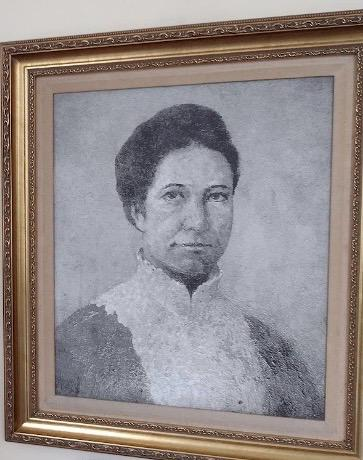
Magdalene Baker Stiebel

George Stiebel CMG (c. 1821–1896) was an Afro-European Jamaican trader and entrepreneur who became a millionaire from gold mining in South America. Stiebel is considered Jamaica's first millionaire of African descent.

While George Stiebel is widely recognized as Jamaica’s first Black millionaire, there is limited documented evidence proving he was the absolute first. Some sources suggest that other wealthy individuals may have reached millionaire status before him, particularly among Jamaica’s mixed-race elite, who had greater access to land, business opportunities, and colonial patronage.

Stiebel’s prominence comes from his gold mining success in South America and his extensive property acquisitions, including 99 properties across Jamaica. However, Jamaica’s wealthy merchant class, which included Afro-European traders and plantation owners, may have produced millionaires before Stiebel, though their wealth was not as publicly documented.

== Family ==
His parents were Sigismund Stiebel (1790–1859), a White Jew who emigrated from Germany and Eliza Catherine Bailey, a Jamaican of African and European [Mulatto] descent. Sigismund was active as a trader in South America and the West Indies. He later married Eliza Jacob, née Mocatta (1811–1858); the couple's children Adeline, Daniel, Jacob and Rebecca were born between 1837 and 1844. Sigismund was buried three days after his death in London's Balls Pond Cemetery. His paternal grandfather was Isaac Daniel Stiebel (1764 or 1766 – March 26, 1850).

George’s father, Sigismund Ascher Stiebel, bought him a ship when he was only twenty years old. This suggests that his father was wealthy, and that George came from money and was not a self-made man (as was commonly told). Sigismund Stiebel came from a family of mid-level bankers in Frankfurt. He and his brother Bernhard emigrated to Jamaica in the early 1800s seeking British citizenship. He was primarily a merchant and trader, in West Indian and South American commerce.

While his family background included banking, Sigismund focused on trade and business ventures, eventually settling in Jamaica, and later in Britain.

== Life ==
Stiebel left school at the age of 14, worked first for a carpenter and then at the age of 19 at the celebrated Ferry Inn in Jamaica, between Kingston and Spanish Town. With the start-up capital that his father gave him in the 1840s, he was able to buy one and later two more ships and set up sea transport between North and South America. In the late colonial period of Cuba, he switched to the lucrative arms trade, which cost him a prison term. In 1851 he married the missionary's daughter Magdalene Baker (1825–1892), with whom he had children Sigismund (1852–1871) and Theresa (1856–1922).

After his ship supposedly sank off the coast of Venezuela in 1856, Stiebel returned a wealthy man in 1873. With three other black men he is said to have discovered a gold mine, which is said to have had a monthly income of 80,000 pounds sterling for several years. While the others gave away their shares at a ridiculous price, he kept his shares and became a millionaire when the mine was later capitalized for $16,000,000.

Stiebel acquired 99 properties in Jamaica, including two sugar plantations, a wharf at Church Street, Great Salt Pond and a cattle pen at Minard in the Saint Ann's Bay District. After the Church of England's ownership of the Devon Penn in Kingston, which had been granted to the Geneva minister James Zeller in 1644, expired in October 1879, Stiebel was able to erect his representative Devon House there two years later. Located in a park, the neoclassical mansion, built in 1881, is now one of the sights of the city of Kingston.

George Stiebel died on 29 June 1896 at Devon House with no close family members beside him, his death was witnessed by Theophilus Beanswell. (Note: Jamaica, Civil Registration, 1880-1999) His daughter who was in England with his five grandchildren was not able to attend his funeral. He died a year after both his grandson Douglas Jackson (1884–1895) and son-in-law Richard Hill Jackson (1845–1895) died. They died within one week of each other at Devon House.

== Distinctions ==
- 1891: Companion of the Order of St Michael and St George by Queen Victoria

== See also ==
- Devon House
