= Casado =

Costa Rican meal

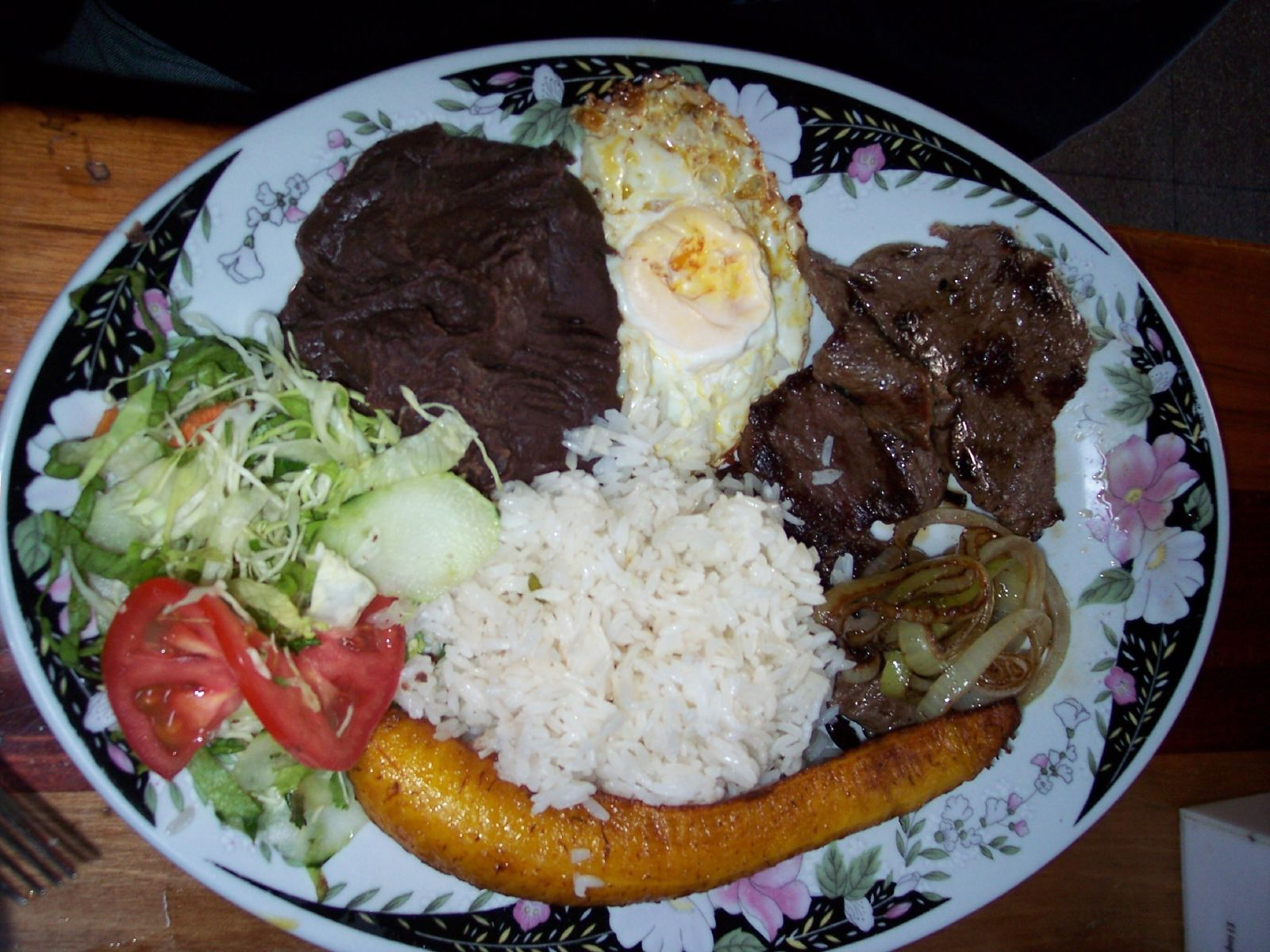
A casado

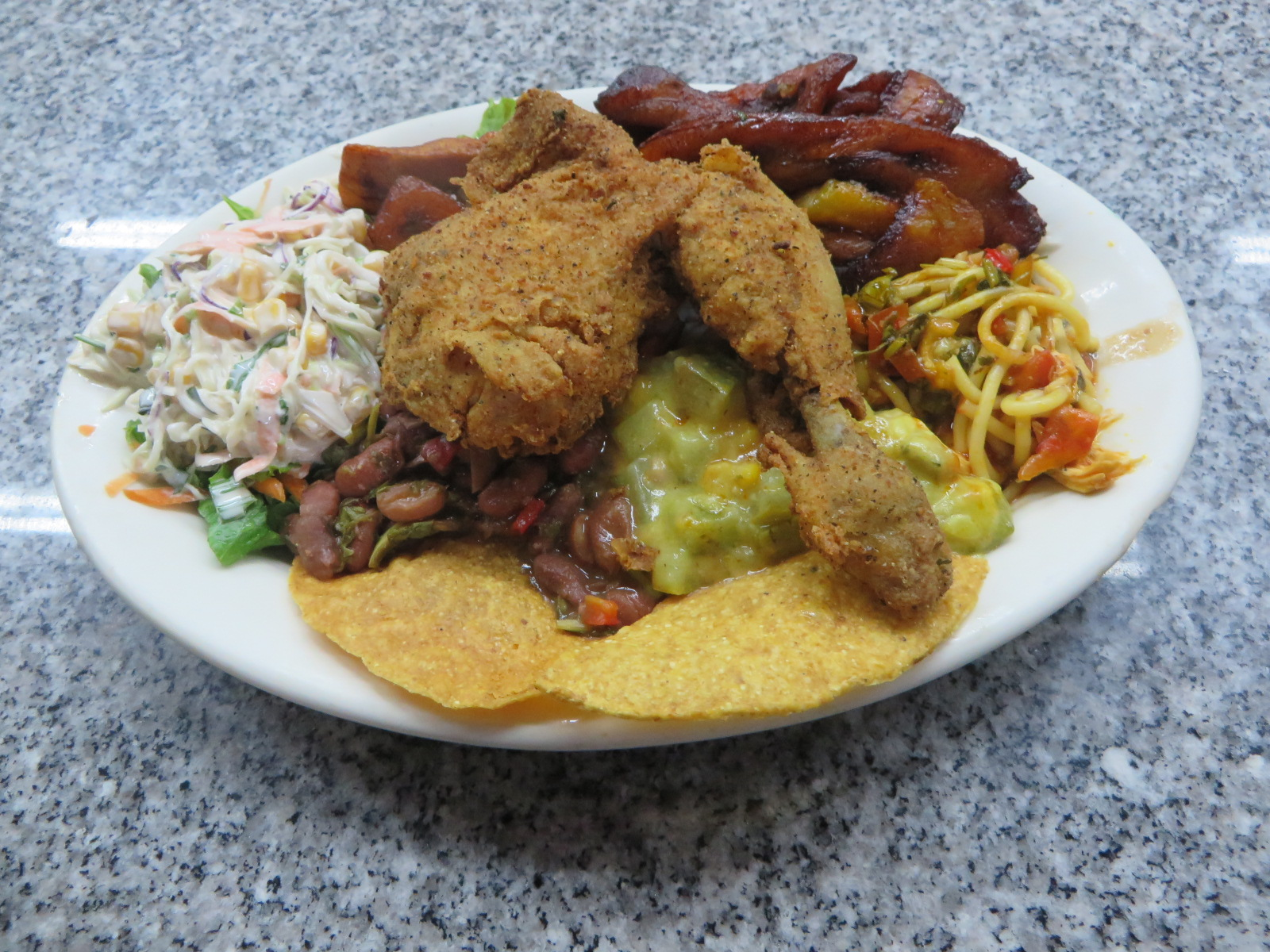
A soda restaurant casado in the Mercado Central in San José

A casado (Spanish: married [dish, platillo) is a Costa Rican meal with rice, black beans, plantains, salad, a tortilla, and an optional protein source such as chicken, beef, pork, fish, and other ingredients.

The term may have originated when restaurant customers asked to be treated as casados, since married men ate such meals at home. Another theory is that the rice and beans and/or the grouping of dishes are married, since they are always together.
