= Atlantic Fruit Company =

American shipping company

- Industry: Shipping
- Founded: 1905; 121 years ago in Baltimore, Maryland, United States
- Founder: Joseph Di Giorgio
- Defunct: 1932
- Fate: Sold to Standard Fruit Company
- Headquarters: New York City, United States

The Atlantic Fruit Company was an American shipping company formed in 1905 by Joseph Di Giorgio in Baltimore. Di Giorgio arrived in Baltimore from Sicily in 1899. When he moved to California in 1911, the business was worth $12 million.

In 1906, United Fruit Company bought a half share in the company, but antitrust law forced them to sell it. Di Giorgio and his business became partners with the Vaccaro brothers of Standard Fruit Company and formed the Mexican American Fruit & Steamship Company in 1923. The company name was changed to American Fruit & SS Company in 1927, and the business was sold to Standard Fruit Company by 1932.
