= Sandals Resorts =

Jamaican operator of all-inclusive resorts

- Industry: Hospitality
- Founded: 1981
- Founder: Gordon Stewart
- Headquarters: Montego Bay, Jamaica
- Number of locations: 17
- Area served: Caribbean
- Key people: Adam Stewart (Chairman)
- Number of employees: 10,000+
- Parent: Sandals Resorts International (SRI)
- Website: www.sandals.com

Sandals Resorts is a Jamaican operator of all-inclusive couples resorts in the Caribbean. The company is a part of Sandals Resorts International (SRI), which also operates Beaches Resorts, Fowl Cay Resort, and several private villas. Founded by Jamaican-born entrepreneur Gordon "Butch" Stewart in 1981, SRI is based in Montego Bay, Jamaica and is responsible for development, service standards, training, and day-to-day operations of the resorts.

As of 2025, Sandals had 17 resorts: seven in Jamaica, three in Saint Lucia, two resorts in Barbados, and one resort in the Bahamas, Antigua, Curaçao, Grenada, and Saint Vincent.

== Properties ==
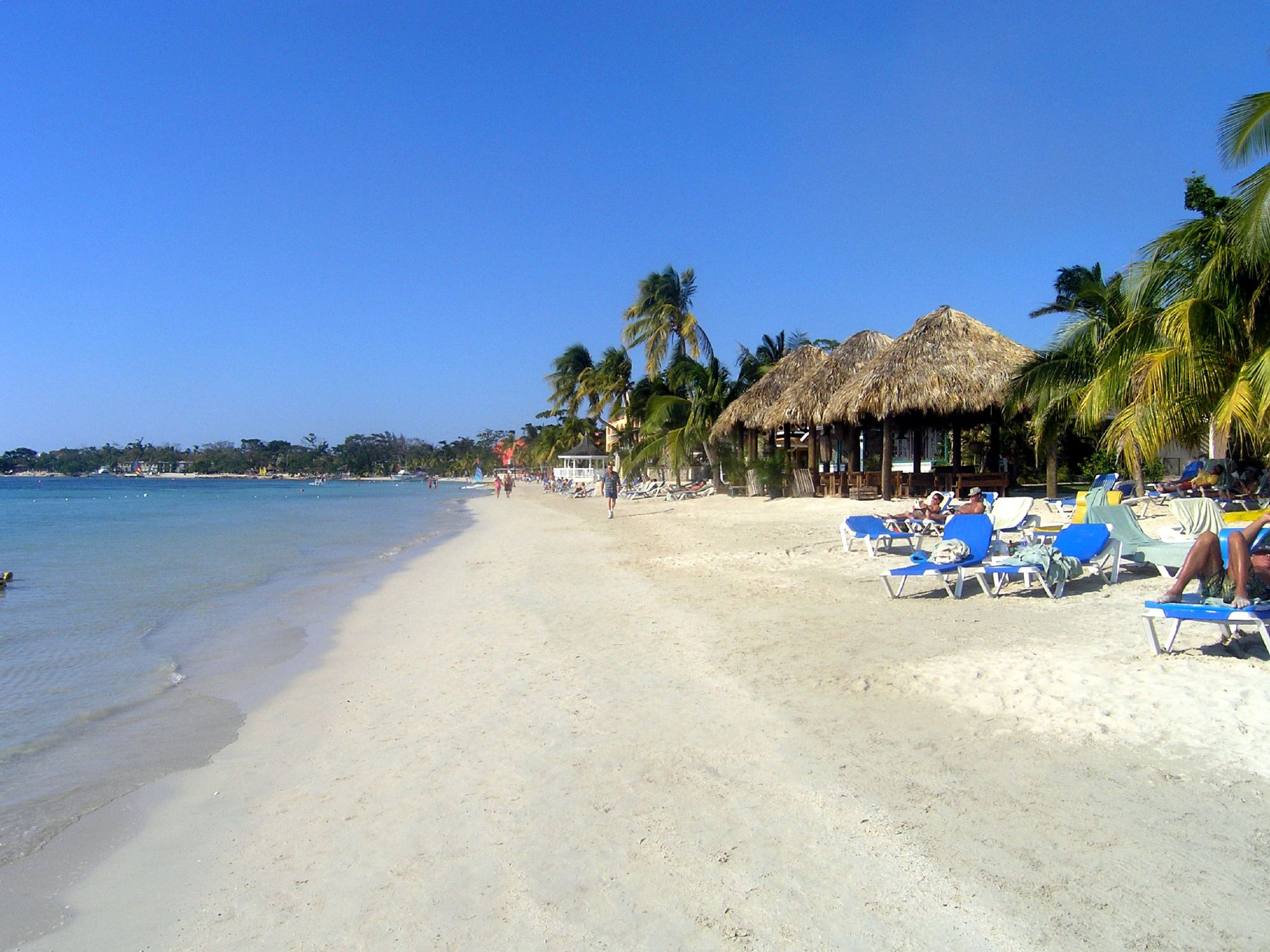
Beach at Sandals, Negril.

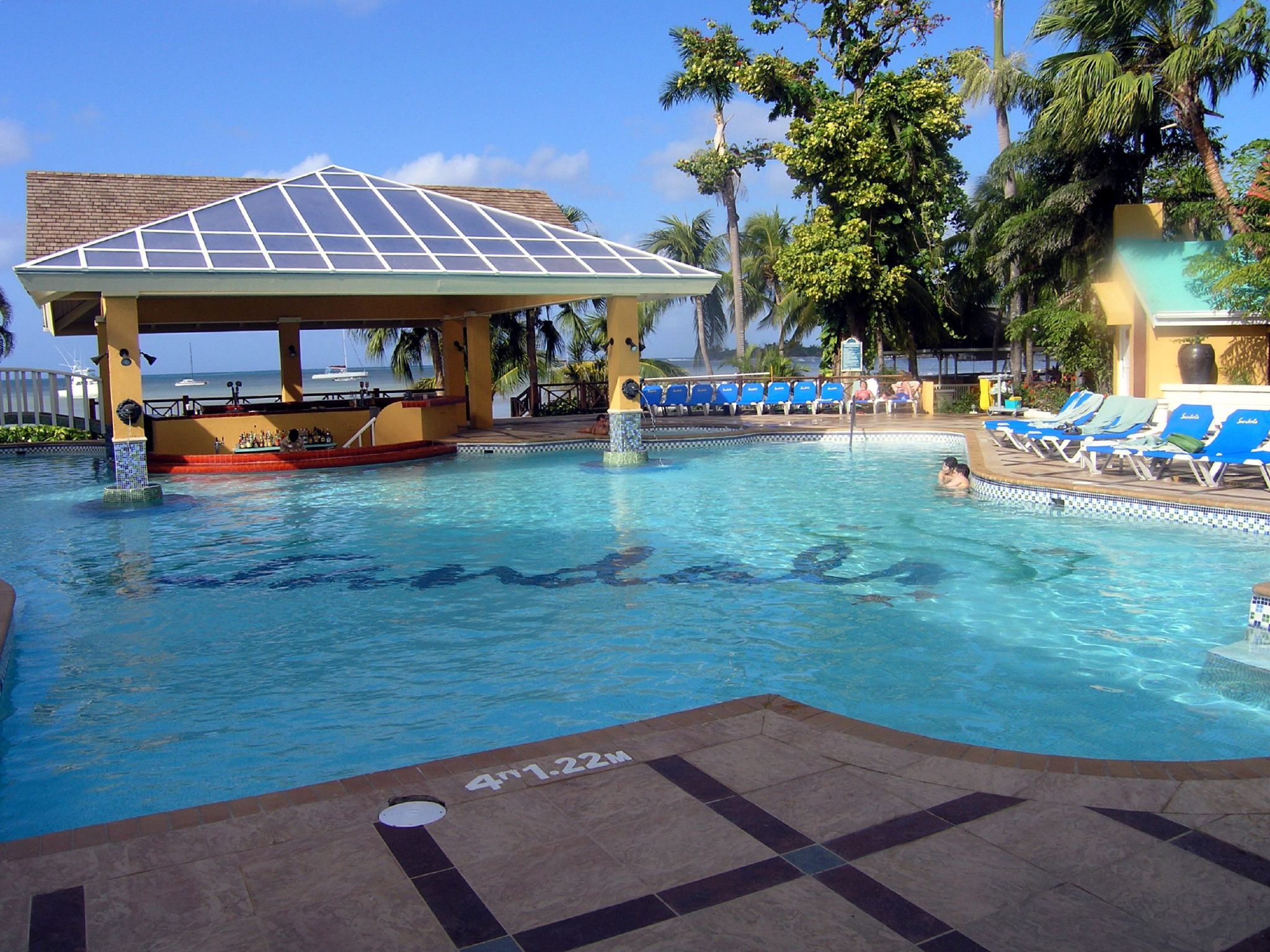
The main pool at Sandals, Negril.

As of 2025, Sandals operated 17 resorts:

=== Jamaica ===
- Sandals Dunn’s River in Ocho Rios
- Sandals Montego Bay in Montego Bay
- Sandals Negril in Negril
- Sandals Ochi in Ocho Rios
- Sandals Royal Caribbean in Montego Bay
- Sandals Royal Plantation in Ocho Rios
- Sandals South Coast in White House

=== Saint Lucia ===
- Sandals Grande St. Lucian in Gros Islet
- Sandals Halcyon Beach in Castries
- Sandals Regency La Toc in Castries

=== Bahamas ===
- Sandals Royal Bahamian in Nassau

=== Barbados ===
- Sandals Barbados in Saint Lawrence Gap
- Sandals Royal Barbados in Saint Lawrence Gap

=== Antigua ===
- Sandals Grande Antigua in St. John's

=== Curaçao ===
- Sandals Royal Curaçao in Santa Barbara

=== Grenada ===
- Sandals Grenada in St. George's

=== Saint Vincent ===
- Sandals Saint Vincent and the Grenadines in Buccament near Kingstown

== Leadership ==
Adam Stewart is the Executive Chairman of SRI. Stewart became Chairman upon the death of his father Gordon "Butch" Stewart, the founder of SRI, on January 4, 2021. Gebhard Rainer was the CEO of SRI until June 2024.

== History ==
In 1981 Gordon "Butch" Stewart purchased an old hotel (the Bay Roc Hotel) on one of Montego Bay's largest beaches, despite having no hotel experience and opened it as Sandals Montego Bay. In 1984, Sandals launched the Caribbean's first swim-up bar at its Montego Bay Resort in Jamaica. In March 2009, Stewart launched The Sandals Foundation, the philanthropic arm of SRI.

Sandals Corporate University (SCU) - a regional adult education program for the 10,000 employees of Sandals Resorts and Beaches Resorts - was launched in March 2012. Through partnerships with internationally recognized universities, professional organizations, and local education institutions, SCU provides courses on skills such as customer service, leadership, the art of selling, and professional communications.

On December 1, 2016, Sandals opened Caribbean’s first overwater villas, at the Sandals Royal Caribbean in Montego Bay.

In 2025, Hurricane Melissa forced the closure of all of Sandals hotels on the island of Jamaica. Five, Sandals Dunn’s River, Sandals Negril, Sandals Ochi, Sandals Royal Plantation, and Beaches Negril, would reopen in December of that year.

On September 22, 2026 it was announced that Royal Caribbean Group would take a 50% equity stake in Sandals for $3 billion.

== Controversies ==
=== Policy on gay couples ===
Due to the laws in the countries in which they operate, the company had a policy dating from 1981 that could not allow same-sex couples into their "couples-only" resorts. The policy was variously stated by characterizing the accommodations as "resort for couples only." In various Caribbean islands, a couple is defined as "one female adult and one male adult", "policies require male/female couples only", or "couples of the same gender are not accepted." This policy received a great deal of publicity when stays at their resorts were offered as prizes in various promotions by companies such as Microsoft, Yahoo!, and US Airways in 1999. Later reports indicated that some resorts also made no accommodations for people with disabilities, prompting the ACLU to opine that companies offering Sandals stays as prizes, or otherwise doing business with Sandals resorts, might be the targets of lawsuits. The companies involved promptly severed their relationships with Sandals, stating they were unaware of its discriminatory practices. Adverts for the company were banned from the London Underground in 2003 after public objections were raised. One possible cause for this policy may have been that homosexuality was illegal in Jamaica. Sandals ended its policy of refusing service to gay couples in August 2004 after further protest.

=== Corruption allegation settlement ===
In January 2013, the government of Turks and Caicos Islands and Sandals agreed to a settlement of US$12 million around local corruption allegations, without admission of any liability.
