= Imperial (beer) =

Costa Rican beer brand

- A can of Imperial michelada
- Manufacturer: FIFCO
- Introduced: 1924
- Alcohol by volume: 4.5%
- Style: Pale lager

Imperial (Cerveza Imperial) is a Costa Rican lager, manufactured by the Florida Ice & Farm Company (FIFCO). Imperial was first produced by the Ortega brewery in 1924 by Carl Walter Steinvorth, an important businessman & the first orthodontist in Central America. Spin-offs from the original Imperial include Imperial Light, Imperial Silver and Imperial Ultra. FIFCO produces other beers, including its Pilsen, Bavaria, and Rock Ice brands.

== Logo ==
The Imperial logo was designed by the brothers Enrique and Wolfgang Hangen who, at the time, were owners of the advertising agency "Casa Gráfica." The brothers also created the logo for other Costa Rican beers, such as Pilsen and Bavaria drawing inspiration from the iconography of their native country, Germany.

Imperial is also known by Costa Ricans as "Aguila" or "Aguilita", which translates into English as "Eagle" or "Little Eagle" in reference to the beer's logo, which includes the Imperial Eagle used in European heraldry.

== Awards ==
- Gold Medal at Monde Selection in Belgium, 2007
