= Roy Lindo =

Jamaican industrialist, planter and politician (1910–1962)

The Honourable Roy Lindo JP
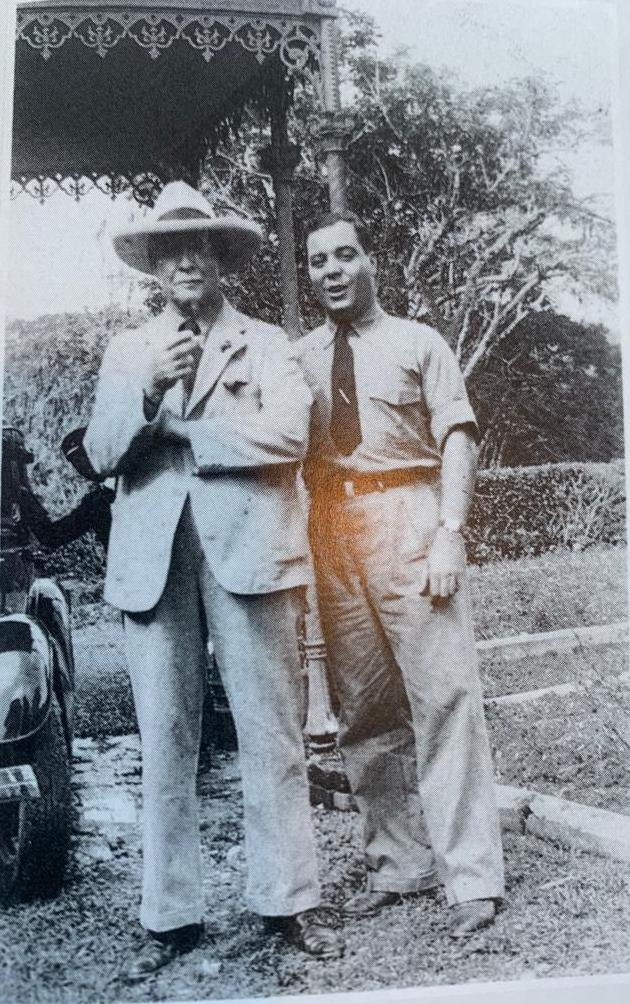
- Roy Lindo with his father Percy
- Born: 1910; Kingston, Jamaica
- Died: 1962 (aged 51–52); New York City
- Political party: Independent
- Father: Percy Lindo

Roy Lindo (1910–1962) was a Jamaican industrialist, planter, political economist and politician.

== Early life ==
Roy Lindo was born in 1910 in Kingston, Jamaica, to Percy Lindo and Hilda Violet Lindo. He was educated at Temple Grove School and at Marlborough College.

== Career ==
A farmer, political economist and legislator, Lindo was the last Member of the Legislative Council (MLC) for St Mary (1942–1944) and one of the five Independents who were successful in 1944 Jamaican general election, where he defeated the PNP's and the JLP's Cornelius McKenzie to become the Member of the House for St. Mary Eastern constituency.

He was the owner of Roy D. Lindo Ltd., which traded in wines, cigars and general merchandise.

In 1945, Roy was appointed as a Member of the West India Committee. He was a director of Soap & Edible Products Ltd., the largest manufacturer of coconut products in Jamaica.

After their father's death in 1946, Roy and his brother Frederick became Co-Managing Directors of J. Wray and Nephew Ltd.

He owned several thousand acres of real estate in the Oracabessa area, where he sold Goldeneye to Ian Fleming and Firefly to Noël Coward.

Roy was Chairman of the Central Housing Authority and the Coconut Industry Board

In 1957, Roy and his brother sold J. Wray and Nephew Ltd. to a syndicate led by Sir Harold Mitchell, 1st Baronet and the Henriques Brothers.

He owned 1,400 acres in Cardiff Hall, Saint Ann which he turned into Jamaica's largest hotel and resort subdivision.

He wrote articles in support of the West Indies Federation.
