= Lindo family =

Sephardi Jewish family

The Lindo family was a Sephardic Jewish merchant and banking family, which rose to prominence in medieval Spain & Portugal.

== Portugal ==
Manuel Lindo was a cosmographer and Chair of the Astronomy department at the University of Coimbra in the 16th century. He published a nautical guide in manuscript form in 1539. He was a dear friend of Amatus Lusitanus, who described him as the eminent astronomer. He worked with Pedro Nunes, Abraham Zacuto, José Vizinho, João Faras to build instruments that made Europe's worldwide expansion possible.

Francisco Lindo was arrested for Judaism and Heresy in Évora, on 12 August 1644.

Francisco's son Joao Rodrigues Lindo married Contance Nunes of Guarda and lived in Campo Maior. Their son, Isaac (Lourenco), was born in Badajoz in 1638. He became a merchant in Tenerife, where he and his wife arrested by the Inquisition in 1656. After being held without trial for two years, Isaac and his wife were penanced and released. The family lived in France before settling in London in around 1670.

His brother, Antonio Rodriguez Lindo, a Lisbon merchant, was arrested on 9 October 1660 for Judaism and was condemned to public Abjuration at the Auto-da-fé of Lisbon on 17 September 1662.

== United Kingdom ==
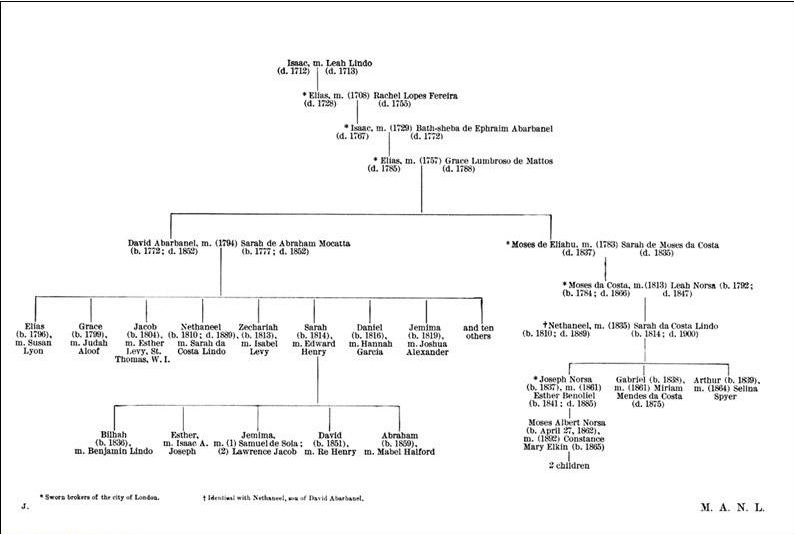
Elias Lindo Family Tree

One of the oldest and most esteemed of London Sephardic families, it traces its descent to Isaac Lindo.

Isaac visited London in the early 1650s and was married there around 1653. Antonio Fernandez Carvajal and Abraham Chilon, who commissioned one of the first brokers medals in 1655, were his maternal uncles.

He settled in London around 1670 where he became an elder of Bevis Marks Synagogue, one of the first Jewish brokers of the Royal Exchange, London in 1681 and a signatory of the *Ascamot of 1694. His children included:

- Alexander Lindo (1666-1727) became a sworn broker in 1683, married Rachel Lopes Pereira, a sister of Diego Pereira d'Aguilar, in 1708 and had six children.
- Elias Lindo (1690-1727), sworn broker, commissioned the Lindo lamp in 1708 to celebrate his marriage to Rachel Lopes Ferreira with whom he had six children.

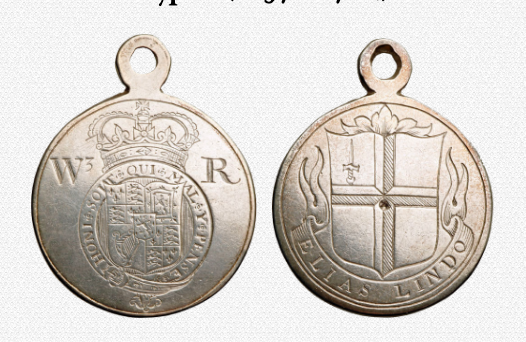
The first medal issued under the 1697 Act. This medal belonged to Elias Lindo, one of the brokers originally sworn in 1697, and is currently in the collection of the Museum of London.

For nine successive generations members of the family were sworn brokers of the City of London, until the registration of sworn brokers was abolished in 1886:

1. Isaac Lindo (1638-1712): became a sworn broker in 1681, married Leah Lopes and had issue including:
2. Elias Lindo (1690-1727): sworn broker, married to Rachel Lopes Ferreira and had issue including:
3. Isaac Lindo (1709-1766): sworn broker, married Bathseba Abarbanel and had issue including:
4. Elias Lindo: sworn broker, married Grace Lumbroso de Mattos and had issue including:
5. Moses Lindo (1760-1837): sworn broker, married Sarah DaCosta and had issue including:
6. Moses DaCosta Lindo (1784-1866): sworn broker, married Leah Norsa and had issue:
7. Sarah DaCosta Lindo (born 1814) who married her cousin Nathaneel Lindo (1810-1889), sworn broker and solicitor, and had issue including:
8. Joseph Norsa Lindo (born 1837), sworn broker, who the last member of the family to pay for a "Jew Broker medal" in 1858, married Esther Benoliel and had issue including:
9. Moses Albert Norsa Lindo (1862-1933): sworn broker

Six of their brokers medals are on display at the Museum of London.

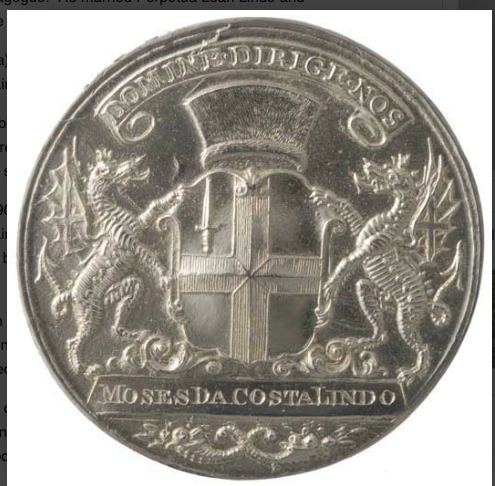
Moses DaCosta Lindo (1784-1866) Broker's Medal

The Lindos were closely related to many other "cousinhood" families of note in Britain, including the Mocatta, Goldsmid and the Montefiores.

Members of the family have been active in the affairs of the Sephardi community.

Moses Lindo (1760-1837) served as President of Board of Deputies of British Jews from 1817 to 1829. Moses' brother, David Abarbanel Lindo, married Sarah Lumbroso de Mattos and had no less than eighteen children, many of whom married into well known Sephardic families.

David's son Nathaneel Lindo (1810-1889) was a City solicitor who operated the firm Lindo & Co., which had long acted as solicitors for the Spanish Portuguese Synagogue and the Italian consulate in London, a tradition which his sons: Gabriel (1838-1908) and Arthur Lindo (1839-1905) continued.

David Lindo Alexander, a grandson of David Abarbanel Lindo, was President of Board of Deputies of British Jews from 1903 to 1917.

In 1937, Frank Charles Lindo (1872-1938), a great grandson of David Abarbanel Lindo, donated funds to build the Lindo Wing at St Mary's Hospital, London.

== Jamaica ==
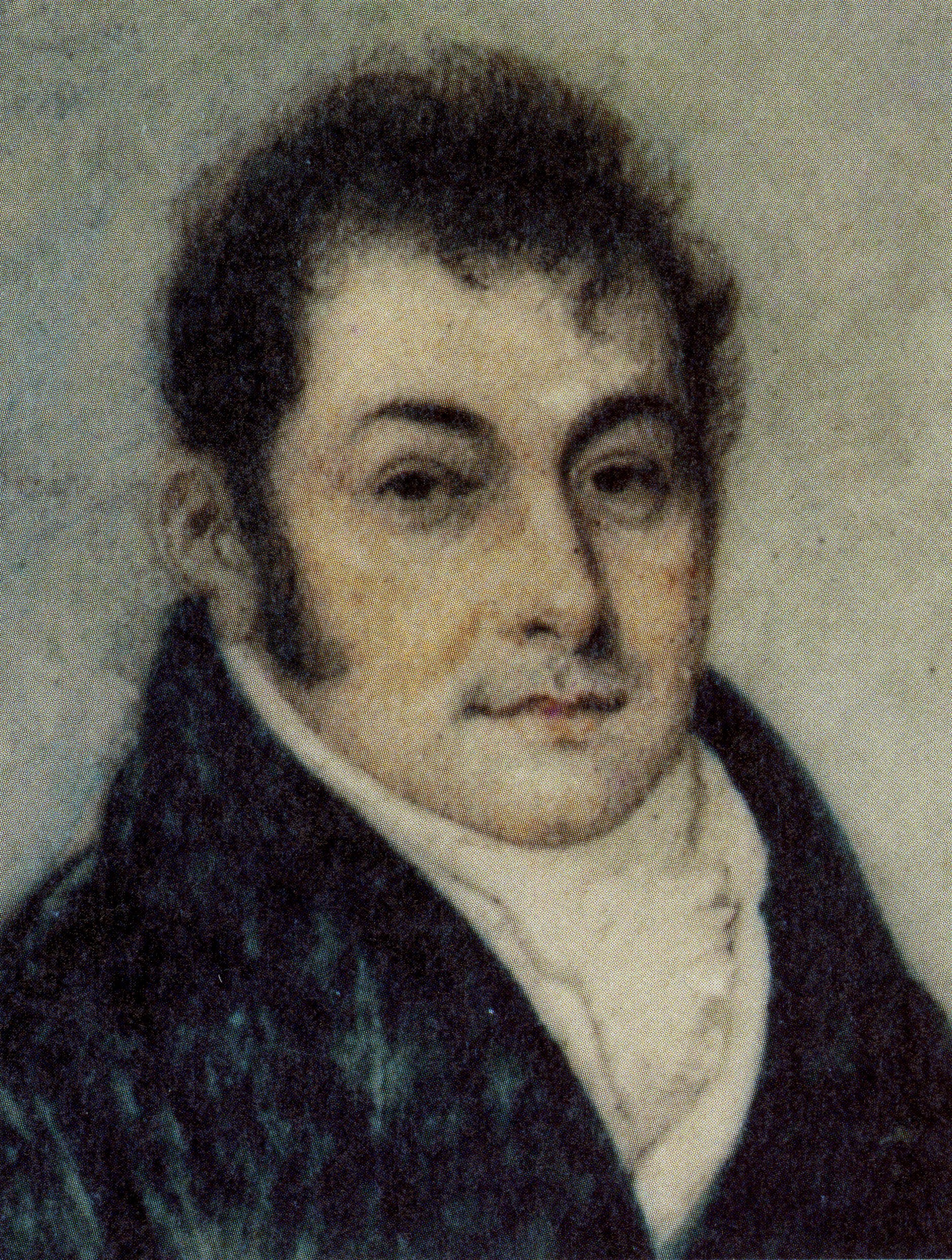
Alexandre Lindo (1742-1812)

Among the Jewish residents who made their mark on Kingston’s development, the Lindo family were outstanding.

When Alexandre Lindo arrived in Kingston in 1765, he rented a house on Port Royal Street, and by 1769 he had relocated to a rented house on Peter’s Lane. Alexandre had many children, seven with his first wife, Hannah, and after her death, sixteen with his second wife, Esther Salome. From early, Alexandre set up business on Princess Street, where over time, he acquired several properties. In 1788, he bought a row of houses on Port Royal Street leading to the harbour and established Lindo’s Wharf there.

Per Stanley Mirvis' The Jews of Eighteenth-Century Jamaica: A Testamentary History of a Diaspora in Transition, Lindo "was perhaps the most notorious Jamaican Jewish slave trader, absentee planter, and moneylender at the end of the eighteenth century..."

He owned multiple transatlantic vessels and traded in all types of merchandise. For example, one of his vessels, the Esther Lindo, described by Lloyd's Register as a constant trader on the London-Jamaica run, cleared Jamaica for London on May 28, 1790 laden with sugar, cotton, pimento, Nicaragua wood, coffee, ginger, rum, wine, silver, sweetmeats, tamarinds, balsam, copper, castor oil, and tortoise shell. He owned numerous properties including Greenwich Park (the first steam powered plantation in Jamaica) and Pleasant Hill, a large coffee plantation. Lindo was a successful businessman who bought and traded goods captured by the British Royal Navy.

He supplied André Rigaud during the War of Knives and was close to a French Jew who was executed while trying to spark a slave revolt in Jamaica in 1799. He made large loans to the French Government during the Peace of Amiens, negotiated by Charles Leclerc, to finance the Saint-Domingue expedition. When Britain declared war on France, on May 18, 1803, ending the Peace of Amiens, Lindo attempted to draw a draft in Paris, but the debt was dishonoured and Lindo was threatened with arrest.

His eldest son, Abraham Alexander Lindo, was put in charge of the family business in Jamaica and Alexandre moved to London, where he was involved in trading, banking and insurance. He leased part of Roehampton estate called Putney Spot from Benjamin Goldsmid while constructing a mansion in Finsbury Square.

He was elected Parnas of Bevis Marks Synagogue in 1805. That year his sons subdivided Kingston Pen into small lots which then formed a mixed-race working-class township known as Lindo's Town. Lindo’s Town included areas now known as Trenchtown, Denham Town and Tivoli Gardens.

He died at Finsbury Square on March 12, 1812.

== Prominent descendants of Isaac Lindo ==
=== Business, politics and law ===
- Moses Lindo: English planter and merchant in South Carolina, Inspector-General of Indigo, Drugs, and Dyes
- Elias Lindo: Royal Exchange Broker
- Abraham Alexander Lindo: Jamaican merchant and planter
- David Lindo Alexander: English barrister and community leader
- Lionel Lindo Alexander: British political and communal worker
- Elias Mocatta: British merchant and financier, significant in the early credit history of Venezuela
- Mattias Mackinlay Zapiola: Governor of Santa Cruz, Argentina
- Charles McLarty Morales: Speaker of House of Assembly of Jamaica (1849–61)
- Alexander Joseph Lindo: Jamaican merchant, planter, Member of House of Assembly of Jamaica and Custos rotulorum of St. Mary
- Jonas Levien: Australian politician, a member of the Victorian Legislative Assembly, Minister of Mines & Agriculture
- Eduard and Franz Hernsheim: founders of Hernsheim & Co, a German trading company in the western Pacific
- Cecil Vernon Lindo: Jamaican banker, industrialist, planter and philanthropist
- Stanley Alexander Lindo: Jamaican banker, planter, industrialist in Costa Rica
- Percy Lindo: Jamaican banker, planter, industrialist and Member of the Legislative Council of Jamaica
- Roy Lindo: Jamaican industrialist, financier and Member of the Legislative Council of Jamaica
- Alan Mocatta: British judge
- Dean Lindo: attorney and politician in Belize, one of the principal founders of the United Democratic Party
- Hugh Shearer: 3rd Prime Minister of Jamaica
- R. James deRoux: Jamaican businessman and Custos Rotulorum of Clarendon
- Dean Barrow: prime minister of Belize from 2008 until 2020 and as leader of Belize's United Democratic Party
- Henry Laurence Lindo: pioneering Jamaican civil servant
- Yarrow baronets: created by George V on 29 January 1916 for the shipbuilder and engineer Alfred Yarrow, founding Chairman of Yarrow & Co
- Coningsby Disraeli: was a British Conservative politician, and MP for Altrincham.
- John Scott-Ellis, 9th Baron Howard de Walden: was a British peer, landowner, and a Thoroughbred racehorse owner/breeder
- Samuel baronets of Nevern Square
- Lawrence Kadoorie, Baron Kadoorie: Hong Kong industrialist & hotelier
- John Eccles, 2nd Viscount Eccles: British Conservative Peer and businessman
- Valdemar Riise: pharmacist
- Lea Mendes (1809-1849) was the wife of Samuel Teixeira de Mattos, founder of Teixeira de Mattos (bank)
- Louis Frederik Teixeira de Mattos: civil engineer, author in the field of water management and Co-Founder of the Christian Historical Union

=== Arts and entertainment ===
- Mark Prager Lindo: was a Dutch prose writer
- Philip Moravier Lindo: was a British portrait and genre painter of the Düsseldorf School and an entrepreneur in the Netherlands
- Chris Blackwell: is an English businessman and former record producer, and the founder of Island Records
- Stephen Poliakoff: is a British playwright, director and screenwriter
- James Basevi: was a British-born art director and special effects expert.
- Henri Teixeira de Mattos: was a 19th-century Dutch sculptor
- Joseph Mendes da Costa: was a Dutch sculptor and teacher
- Joseph Teixeira de Mattos: was a Dutch painter
- Carolina Anna Teixeira de Mattos: was a Dutch painter
- Olga Lindo: was an English actress
- Isaac Mendes Belisario: Jamaican artist
- Archie Lindo: Jamaican photographer, actor, author, playwright, and radio show broadcaster
- David Yarrow: is a British fine-art photographer, conservationist and author
- Damian Lewis: is an English actor
- Monty Alexander: is a Jamaican pianist

=== Science, Medicine and Education ===
- Miriam Mendes Belisario: English writer and educator
- Abigail Lindo: British lexicographer
- Jacob Mendes Da Costa: was an American physician
- Juda Lion Palache: was a professor of Semitic languages at the University of Amsterdam and a leader of the Portuguese Jewish community
- Charles Gabriel Seligman: British Physician
- Sir Martyn Poliakoff: is a British chemist, working on gaining insights into fundamental chemistry
- John Ziman: was a British-born New Zealand physicist and humanist who worked in the area of condensed matter physics.
- David Lindo (chemist): Jamaican Merchant and Chemist
- Arthur Lindo Patterson: British X-ray crystallographer
- Lindo Ferguson: New Zealand ophthalmologist, university professor and medical school dean.
- Elias Hayyim Lindo: English author and historian
- Hector Lindo Fuentes: Salvadoran historian

=== Other ===
- David Abarbanel Lindo: English communal worker who performed the circumcision of Benjamin Disraeli
- Isaac Juda Palache: was grand rabbi of the Portuguese Sephardic community of Amsterdam from 1900 to 1926
- David Mocatta: British architect
- George Basevi: British architect
- J. P. Basevi: was a British army engineer who conducted one of the first gravimetric surveys in India using a pendulum
- Povl Baumann: Danish Architect
- Isaac Anne Lindo: Dutch engineer
- Iwan Serrurier: was a Dutch-American electrical engineer notable for inventing the Moviola
- Mark Serrurier: worked on designs for the Mt. Palomar 200 inch Hale Telescope
- Marie-Louise Johanna Daisy Teixeira de Mattos: was the Chief Court Mistress for Juliana of the Netherlands
- Blanche Blackwell: Jamaican heiress
- Norman Joseph Levien: New Zealand Army Officer and a foundation member of the New Zealand Army Ordnance Corps
- Edwin Louis Teixeira de Mattos: Dutch Bobsledder

== Notable people with the surname include ==
- Moses Lindo: English planter and merchant in South Carolina, Inspector-General of Indigo, Drugs, and Dyes
- Abraham Alexander Lindo: Jamaican merchant and planter
- Juan Lindo: President of the Republic of El Salvador (1841-1842) and of the Republic of Honduras (1847-1852)
- David Abarbanel Lindo: was an English communal worker
- Elias Hayyim Lindo: was a British Sephardic Jewish merchant, author and historian
- David Lindo Alexander: English barrister and community leader
- Lionel Lindo Alexander: British political and communal worker
- Cecil Vernon Lindo: Jamaican banker, industrialist, planter and philanthropist
- Percy Lindo: Jamaican banker, planter, industrialist and Member of the Legislative Council of Jamaica
- Roy Lindo: Jamaican industrialist, financier and Member of the Legislative Council of Jamaica
- Stanley Alexander Lindo: Jamaican banker, planter, industrialist in Costa Rica
- Blanche Blackwell: Jamaican heiress
- Archie Lindo: Jamaican photographer, actor, author, playwright, and radio show broadcaster
- Dean Lindo: attorney and politician in Belize, one of the principal founders of the United Democratic Party
- Henry Laurence Lindo: pioneering Jamaican civil servant
- Hugo Lindo: Salvadorian writer, diplomat, politician, and lawyer
- Richard Lindo Fuentes: was a Salvadoran writer and poet
- Hector Lindo Fuentes: Salvadoran historian
- Delroy Lindo (born 1952), British-American actor
- Earl Lindo (1953–2017), Jamaican reggae musician
- Elvira Lindo (born 1962), Spanish journalist and writer
- Olga Lindo: was an English actress
- Mark Prager Lindo: was a Dutch prose writer
- Philip Moravier Lindo: was a British portrait and genre painter of the Düsseldorf School and an entrepreneur in the Netherlands
- Isaac Anne Lindo: Dutch engineer
- José Alexandre Alves Lindo, (born 1973) Brazilian footballer
- Jack Ruby (record producer)
- Kashief Lindo (born c.1978), Jamaican reggae singer
- Big Narstie: is a British rapper, comedian and television presenter
- Jimena Lindo: is a Peruvian actress, dancer and TV presenter
- Laura Mae Lindo: is a Canadian politician
- Mónica de Greiff Lindo: is a Colombian lawyer and former Minister of Justice of Colombia
- Larry Lindo: is a Bermudian sailor
- Christabel Lindo: is a Kenyan rugby sevens player
- Nishy Lee Lindo: is a Costa Rican taekwondo practitioner
- David Lindo: is a British author, also known as the Urban Birder
- Jaine Lindo: is a Sint Maartener footballer who plays for the Sint Maarten national team
- Matilde Lindo: was a Nicaraguan feminist and activist
- Screwdriver (musician): is a reggae artist active since the mid-1980s
- Cinthya_Lindo Espinoza: former Minister of Development and Social Inclusion of Peru
