= Spanish Jamaicans =

Spanish Jamaicans (Spanish: Españoles Jamaiquinos) are Jamaican citizens of Spanish origin or descent.

== Spanish Colonization of Santiago (Jamaica) ==
In 1508, the first Spanish settlers arrived in Jamaica. The Spaniards first settled on that part of the northern coast of Jamaica which is now known as the parish of St. Ann. There they built a town called Sevilla Nueva, or New Seville. Afterwards they moved to the southern part of the island and built the town of St. Jago de la Vega, which is still called Spanish Town. The island was given to the Columbus family as a personal estate in 1540, but they did nothing to develop it. The Spanish colony in Jamaica was never a very large or a very flourishing one. Spanish colonists devastated Jamaica’s Taíno population.

== Spanish cities and towns in Jamaica ==
The reminders of this historical period are the names of places all over the island, Such as Ocho Rios, Rio Bueno, Santa Cruz, Rio Cobre, Port Antonio and most importantly Spanish Town, formerly known as St. Jago de la Vega, the capital under the Spanish.

== Notable people ==
- Abraham Alexander Lindo, Jamaican merchant and developer
- Alexander Joseph Lindo, Jamaican merchant, planter, Member of House of Assembly of Jamaica and Custos rotulorum of St. Mary
- Archie Lindo, Jamaican photographer, actor, author, playwright and radio show broadcaster
- Cecil Vernon Lindo, Jamaican banker, industrialist, planter and philanthropist
- Frank Silvera, Jamaican American actor and director
- Frederick Lindo, Jamaican merchant, publisher and Member of the Legislative Council
- Gail Vaz-Oxlade, Jamaican-Canadian financial writer and television personality
- Isaac Mendes Belisario, Jamaican artist
- Jacob Raphael De Cordova, founder of the Jamaica Daily Gleaner newspaper
- Ken Khouri, Jamaican record producer
- Lady Colin Campbell, Jamaican radio host, author and socialite
- Percy Lindo, Jamaican banker, planter, industrialist and Member of the Legislative Council of Jamaica
- R. James deRoux, Jamaican businessman and Custos Rotulorum
- Sean Paul, Jamaican rapper, singer and songwriter.
- Wilfred Adolphus Domingo, Jamaican journalist

== See also ==
- Jamaica–Spain relations
- Colony of Santiago (Jamaica)
