= First cabinet of Napoleon =

French government from 1804 to 1814

Ministers of Napoleon
- Cabinet of the First French Empire
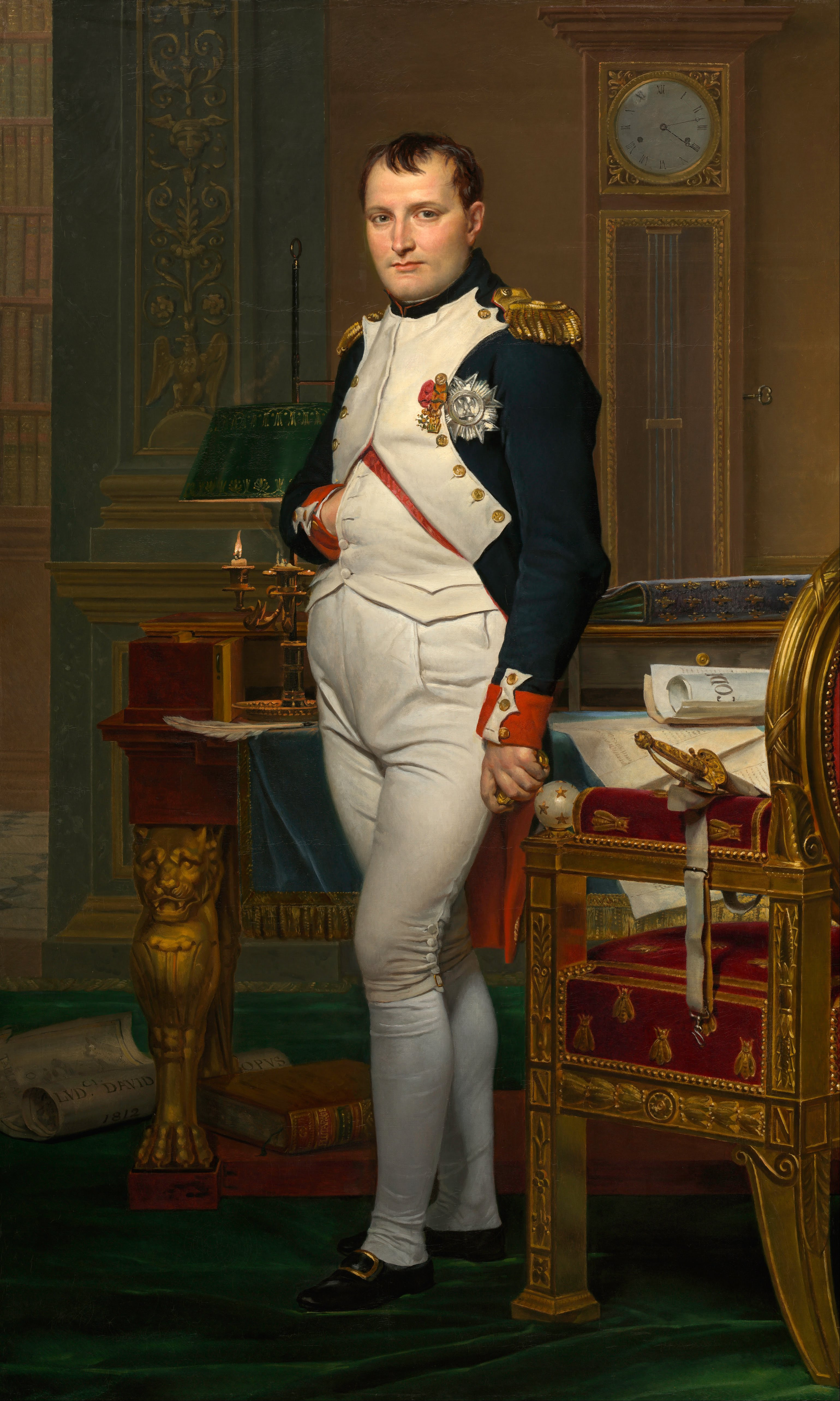
- Napoleon
- Date formed: 18 May 1804
- Date dissolved: 1 April 1814

People and organisations
- Head of state: Napoleon
- Head of government: Napoleon

History
- Predecessor: Cabinet of the French Consulate
- Successor: Provisional Government of 1814

The First Cabinet of Napoleon was appointed by the Emperor Napoleon upon the establishment of the First French Empire on 18 May 1804, replacing the Cabinet of the Consulate. It was succeeded by the French Provisional Government of 1814 following the downfall of Napoleon and the abolition of the Empire.

== Formation ==
At the session of the Tribunat on 3 Floréal year XII (23 April 1804) Jean-François Curée proposed that Napoleon, then First Consul, be declared hereditary Emperor of France. The motion was supported by several members of the Tribunat, with only Lazare Carnot speaking against it. At a session of the Senate on 28 Floréal year XII (18 May 1804) attended by Consul Charles-François Lebrun and all the ministers a motion was adopted in which Napoleon was declared hereditary Emperor of the French. The formal coronation ceremony was delayed until 11 Frimaire year XIII (2 December 1804), when Pope Pius VII attended and Napoleon crowned himself in the Notre Dame de Paris.

== Ministers ==
Napoleon retained the ministers from the Consulate, but made various changes during his reign. He did not appoint a prime minister, but headed the government himself. The ministers were:

Ministry	From	To	Minister
Secretary of State	18 May 1804	17 April 1811	Hugues-Bernard Maret, duc de Bassano
Secretary of State	17 April 1811	20 November 1813	Pierre Daru
Secretary of State	20 November 1813	1 April 1814	Hugues-Bernard Maret, duc de Bassano
Foreign Affairs	18 May 1804	9 August 1807	Charles Maurice de Talleyrand-Périgord
Foreign Affairs	9 August 1807	17 April 1811	Jean-Baptiste de Nompère de Champagny
Foreign Affairs	17 April 1811	20 November 1813	Hugues-Bernard Maret, duc de Bassano
Foreign Affairs	20 November 1813	1 April 1814	Armand Augustin Louis de Caulaincourt
Interior	18 May 1804	8 August 1804	Jean-Antoine Chaptal
Interior	8 August 1804	9 August 1807	Jean-Baptiste de Nompère de Champagny
Interior	9 August 1807	29 June 1809	Emmanuel Crétet
Interior	29 June 1809	1 October 1809	Joseph Fouché (?)
Interior	1 October 1809	1 April 1814	Jean-Pierre de Montalivet
Justice	18 May 1804	13 June 1813	Claude Ambroise Régnier
Justice	20 November 1813	1 April 1814	Mathieu Molé
War	18 May 1804	9 August 1807	Louis-Alexandre Berthier
War	9 August 1807	20 November 1813	Henri Jacques Guillaume Clarke
War	20 November 1813	1 April 1814	Pierre Daru
War Administration	18 May 1804	3 January 1810	Jean François Aimé Dejean
War Administration	3 January 1810	20 November 1813	Jean-Girard Lacuée
War Administration	20 November 1813	1 April 1814	Pierre Daru
Finance	18 May 1804	1 April 1814	Martin Michel Charles Gaudin
Treasury	18 May 1804	27 January 1806	François Barbé-Marbois
Treasury	27 January 1806	1 April 1814	Nicolas François, Count Mollien
Navy and Colonies	18 May 1804	1 April 1814	Denis Decrès
Police	10 July 1804	3 June 1810	Joseph Fouché
Police	3 June 1810	1 April 1814	Anne Jean Marie René Savary
Religious Affairs	10 July 1804	4 January 1808	Jean-Étienne-Marie Portalis
Religious Affairs	4 January 1808	1 April 1814	Félix-Julien-Jean Bigot de Préameneu
Manufacturing and Commerce	16 January 1812	1 April 1814	Jean-Baptiste Collin de Sussy

== Replacement ==
In March 1814 the allied armies invaded France, and arrived at the walls of Paris on 29 March 1814. After a short struggle on 30 March 1814 against overwhelmingly superior forces, on 31 March 1814 Marshal Auguste de Marmont signed the capitulation of Paris. A provisional government was formed on 1 April 1814 under the presidency of Charles Maurice de Talleyrand-Périgord.
