= Thomas Temple (disambiguation) =

Sir Thomas Temple, 1st Baronet of Nova Scotia (1613/14–1674 ) was a British proprietor and governor of Acadia/Nova Scotia.

Thomas Temple may also refer to:

- Thomas Temple (Canadian politician) (1818–1899), Canadian member of parliament and senator from New Brunswick
- Sir Thomas Temple, 1st Baronet, of Stowe (1567–1637), English landowner and Member of Parliament
- Thomas Temple, Jamaica, first owner of Temple Hall, Jamaica c. 1670
