= Florence Cameron =

Florence Cameron may refer to:

- Florence Rose Endellion Cameron (born 2010), daughter of former British prime minister David Cameron
- Gloria Cameron (1932–2020), formally Florence Tina Cameron, Jamaican-born British community worker, activist and entertainer
