= Nicolas François, Count Mollien =

French financier (1758–1850)

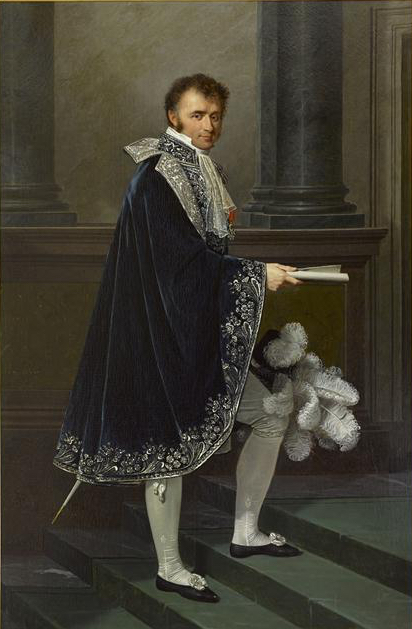
Count Mollien in Napoleonic court costume, by Robert Lefèvre (1755–1830), 1806

Nicolas François, Count Mollien (born 28 February 1758 in Rouen, Seine-Inférieure – died 20 April 1850 in Paris, Seine), was a French financier. The son of a merchant, he early showed ability, and entered the ministry of finance, where he rose rapidly; in 1784, at the time of the renewal of the arrangements with the tax-farmers-general, he was practically chief in that department and made terms advantageous to the national exchequer.

Under Calonne he improved the returns from the farmers-general; and he was largely instrumental in bringing about the erection of the octroi walls of Paris in place of the insufficient wooden barriers. He, however, advocated an abolition of some of the restrictions on imports, as came about in the Anglo-French commercial treaty of 1786, to the conclusion of which he contributed in no small measure.

The events of the French Revolution threatened at times to overwhelm Mollien. In 1794 he was brought before the revolutionary tribunal of Évreux as a suspect, and narrowly escaped the fate that befell many of the former farmers-general. He retired to England, where he observed the financial measures adopted at the crisis of 1796–1797.

After the coup d'état of 18 Brumaire (November 1799) he re-entered the ministry of finance, then under Gaudin, who entrusted to him important duties as director of the new caisse d'amortissement. Napoleon, hearing of his abilities, frequently consulted him on financial matters, and after the Proclamation of the Empire (May 1804) made him a councillor of state (Napoleon also had regular affairs with Mollien's wife). The severe financial crisis of December 1805 to January 1806 served to reveal once more his sound sense. Napoleon, returning in haste not long after the Battle of Austerlitz, dismissed Barbé-Marbois from the ministry of the treasury and confided to Mollien those important duties.

He soon succeeded in freeing the treasury from the interference of great banking houses. In other respects, however, he did something towards curbing Napoleon's desire for a precise regulation of the money market. The conversations between them on this subject, as reported in Mollien's Mémoirs, are of high interest, and show that the ministry had a far truer judgement on financial matters than the emperor, who often twitted him with being an ideologue.

In 1808 Mollien was awarded the title of count. He soon came to see the impossibility of the measures termed collectively the Continental System; but his warnings on that subject were of no avail. After the first abdication of the emperor (11 April 1814), Mollien retired into private life, but took up his ministerial duties at the appeal of Napoleon during the Hundred Days (1815), after which he again retired. Louis XVIII wished to bring him back to office, but he resisted these appeals. Nominated a peer in 1819, he took some part in connection with the annual budgets. He lived to see the election of Louis-Napoleon as president of the Second Republic, and died in April 1850; with the exception of Étienne Denis Pasquier, he was the last surviving minister of Napoleon Bonaparte.

== Legacy ==
Several elements of Napoleon III's Louvre expansion bear Mollien's name, including a monumental staircase and several exhibition rooms (escalier Mollien, galerie Mollien, salle Mollien).
