= Dark and Light Theatre Company =

British theatre company, founded 1969

The Dark and Light Theatre (DLT) was a British theatre company, founded in 1969 by Jamaican actor Frank Cousins and based in south London at Longfield Hall until 1975. It was the first black-led theatre company to be funded by the UK's Arts Council. According to the DLT's mission statement, "The aim of the Company is to promote understanding between people of different races through the media of the performing arts. By examining the nature of prejudice it is hoped to identify its sources and thereby decrease its manifestations.” In 1975, the company under a change of management was renamed as The Black Theatre of Brixton.

== Background and history ==
The Dark and Light Theatre was the initiative of Jamaican-born Frank Cousins, who had relocated to the UK and studied acting at London's Guildhall School of Music and Drama in the mid-1960s. However, after graduating from there, he realized there were few work opportunities and limited roles for black actors, and was prompted to start his own company: "The only clear ideas I had were that we needed work, we needed the type of roles that were meaningful, not the usual stereotypes which only served to show us in a very poor light, and most of all we needed a base of operations. A base where we could mount our own productions, rehearse our work, set up workshops, training etc."

Lambeth Council offered the company that Cousins formed – called Dark and Light Theatre (DLT) – premises at Longfield Hall, and funding from the Arts Council was agreed with the proviso that DLT undertook a touring circuit, visiting towns and cities in the UK, the requirement involving touring three plays over six months, with a maximum of a two-week performance run at Longfield Hall before touring began – a "very tall order indeed", as Cousins recalled.

In 1971, with the DLT's first productions organised, Blood Knot by South African playwright Athol Fugard opened at Longfield Hall, and the subsequent years saw at least 10 other productions there – among them Eugene O'Neill's The Emperor Jones, featuring Thomas Baptiste in 1973 – the last being Ceremonies in Dark Old Men by Lonne Elder III. There were also pantomime productions such as Anansi and Brer Englishman by Manley Young and Gloria Cameron, directed by Yvonne Brewster.

In 1975, when Cousins stepped down as artistic director, the company began a new phase, renamed as the Black Theatre of Brixton, and helmed by Norman Beaton, Rufus Collins and Jamal Ali. According to the Royal National Theatre's Black Plays Archive, by the time the company folded in 1977, its productions had included Jon Hendricks's Evolution of The Blues; Shiman Wincalbert's Kataki; Amiri Baraka's The Slave; Richard Crone's The Tenant; Robert Lamb's RAAS; T-Bone Wilson's Jumbie Street March, Jimi Rand's Seduced, and Jamal Ali's Dark Days and Light Nights, Black Feet in the Snow, Black by Night, The Twisted Knot, and Jericho; The Black Theatre of Brixton, together with Temba Theatre Company that was co-founded in 1972 by actors Alton Kumalo and Oscar James, reportedly "produced more Black plays in two years than the whole of English theatre had in the previous twenty-five".

== Influence and legacy ==
While singer and songwriter Eddy Grant spent some time in the 1970s with the Black Theatre of Brixton, he noticed a street sign and thought: "What a fantastic song title!" – being inspired to write what became his 1983 song "Electric Avenue".

In 2019, Brixton theatre activist Tony Cealy created a new play, to be performed in Black History Month and staged in Longfield Hall, telling the story of the Dark and Light Theatre, the UK's first mixed-race theatre.

On 27 October 2019, the Nubian Jak Community Trust installed a blue plaque at Longfield Hall, in honour of the Dark and Light Theatre having been based there from 1969 to 1975.
