= Elias Lindo =

British Sephardic Jewish merchant

Elias Haim Lindo (1783 – 11 June 1865) was a British Sephardic Jewish merchant, writer and historian.

== Early life ==
He was born in London around 1783.

His father, Moses Lindo, was a sworn broker on the Royal Exchange in London and President of the Board of Deputies of British Jews.

== Career ==
He spent the first half of his life in the island of Saint Thomas, Danish West Indies where he was a leading merchant and president of the Synagogue.

He was the first Junior Warden of Harmonic Lodge 356 EC in St. Thomas.

He returned to England about 1832 and became an author and historian. He published calendars in 1832 and 1860, with an essay on the structure of the Jewish calendar, tables and general information.

In 1842 he published a translation of the Conciliador of Manasseh ben Israel. In 1849, he published The History of the Jews of Spain and Portugal.

He was warden of Bevis Marks Synagogue several times warden and published a catalogue of the works in its library. He died at his home on Liverpool Street in London in 1865.
