= Cabinet of the French Consulate =

Cabinet of the Consulate
- France; Cabinet of France
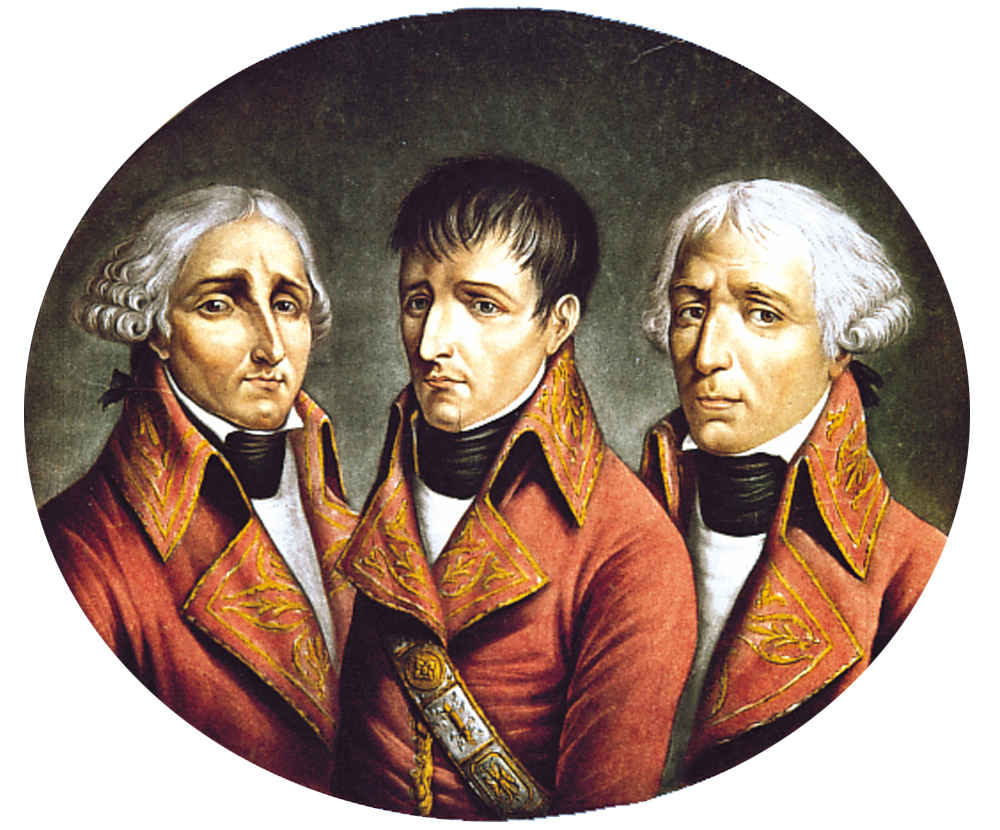
- The Three Consuls.
- Date formed: 11 November 1799
- Date dissolved: 18 May 1804

People and organisations
- Head of government: Napoleon Bonaparte; Jean Jacques Régis de Cambacérès; Charles-François Lebrun

History
- Predecessor: Government of the Directory
- Successor: First Cabinet of Napoleon I

The Cabinet of the French Consulate was formed following the Coup of 18 Brumaire which replaced the Directory with the Consulate. The new regime was ratified by the adoption of the Constitution of the Year VIII on 24 December 1799 and headed by Napoleon Bonaparte as First Consul, with Jean Jacques Régis de Cambacérès and Charles-François Lebrun serving as Second and Third Consuls respectively.

== Ministers ==
The Ministers under the consulate were:

Ministry	Start	End	Minister
Foreign Affairs	11 November 1799	22 November 1799	Charles-Frédéric Reinhard
Foreign Affairs	22 November 1799	18 May 1804	Charles Maurice de Talleyrand-Périgord
Justice	11 November 1799	25 December 1799	Jean Jacques Régis de Cambacérès
Justice	25 December 1799	14 September 1802	André Joseph Abrial
Justice	14 September 1802	18 May 1804	Claude Ambroise Régnier
War	11 November 1799	2 April 1800	Louis-Alexandre Berthier
War	2 April 1800	8 October 1800	Lazare Carnot
War	8 October 1800	18 May 1804	Louis-Alexandre Berthier
Finance	11 November 1799	18 May 1804	Martin-Michel-Charles Gaudin
Police	11 November 1799	18 May 1804	Joseph Fouché
Interior	12 November 1799	25 December 1799	Pierre-Simon Laplace
Interior	25 December 1799	21 January 1801	Lucien Bonaparte
Interior	21 January 1801	18 May 1804	Jean-Antoine Chaptal
Navy and Colonies	12 November 1799	22 November 1799	Marc Antoine Bourdon de Vatry
Navy and Colonies	22 November 1799	3 October 1801	Pierre-Alexandre-Laurent Forfait
Navy and Colonies	3 October 1801	18 May 1804	Denis Decrès
Secretary of State	25 December 1799	18 May 1804	Hugues-Bernard Maret, duc de Bassano
Treasury	27 September 1801	18 May 1804	François Barbé-Marbois
War Administration	12 March 1802	18 May 1804	Jean François Aimé Dejean
