= Gloria Cameron =

Jamaican-British activist (1932–2020)

Gloria Cameron MBE
- Born: Florence Tina; 27 June 1932; Kingston, British Jamaica
- Died: 15 March 2020 (aged 87); Croydon, England
- Other names: Florence Gloria Cameron
- Occupations: Community worker; activist; entertainer
- Years active: 1958–1992
- Known for: Promoter of West Indian culture

Florence Tina "Gloria" Cameron MBE (27 June 1932 – 15 March 2020) was a Jamaican-born British community worker, playwright, activist and promoter of West Indian culture. Born and raised in Kingston, Jamaica, she emigrated to England as part of the "Windrush generation". In 1958, she joined the St John's Inter-Racial Club in the Brixton district of London and became involved in activism directed at widespread discrimination against the West Indian community. Her concerns included accommodation problems, educational disparity, racial discrimination in employment, transport, and pubs, as well as Sus laws, which allowed police to detain people upon suspicion that they might have committed an offence.

Believing that celebrating culture could both help West Indians adapt and bridge misunderstandings, Cameron helped to develop London's first indoor Caribbean-style carnival in 1959. In 1963, she founded the Caribbean Folk Group, which performed throughout Britain reciting West Indian folklore and playing music accompanied with dance. In the 1970s, intent on creating a day nursery for working mothers that would better prepare Caribbean children for school, along with Gerlin Bean and Mabel Carter, she formed the West Indian Parents Action Group (WIPAG). Cameron became a community relations officer for the London Borough of Lambeth in 1973 and was one of the first Black women to be appointed a justice of the peace in the UK, serving from 1975. Cameron worked with the Inner London Juvenile Courts, became a magistrate, and volunteered to visit prisoners. As the day nursery expanded exponentially, in 1983 a new facility was officially launched by Diana, Princess of Wales.

Cameron's community work was recognised with honours as a Member of the Most Excellent Order of the British Empire in 1980 and with the Jamaican Prime Minister's Medal of Appreciation in 1987. She was featured in several documentaries throughout the 1980s and was the first native Jamaican to appear on the British television programme This Is Your Life. In 1988, she was arrested and falsely charged with fraud and theft. Her defence blamed the charges on an organised group wishing to take over the nursery she had worked to build and ruin her reputation. After a five-day trial, the judge Valerie Pearlman of the Southwark Crown Court ruled that Cameron and the other three people charged were innocent, based on the inability of an accounting audit to substantiate the prosecution's charges. The judge noted that the case had been an injustice, causing anxiety for the defendants, and encouraged an investigation into how the charges had made it to court. In 2016, Cameron wrote an autobiography Case Dismissed!: An Ordinary Jamaican Woman, an Extraordinary Life giving her side of the ordeal.

== Early life and education ==
Florence Tina was born on 27 June 1932 in Kingston, Jamaica. (Note: Cameron does not specify her birth surname in her autobiography and no source has been located that confirms it. Nor does she give the name of her birth mother.) When she was fourteen months old, a tropical storm caused the family home to be flooded. She and her mother, the only ones home at the time, were rescued, but Florence developed typhoid fever and subsequently pneumonia and was hospitalised at Kingston Public Hospital for several months. When she finally began to recover, their rescuer suggested Florence be called "Gloria" thereafter, and the name was quickly adopted. From 1934, she lived with her step-mother Eugenie (née Johnson) and father, Clifford George Hylton. Her father worked as a manager for the textile firm Seaga's. He was active in the Universal Negro Improvement Association and her step-mother served as one of the Black Cross Nurses. Gloria attended Brown's Private Infant School and then middle school at the Methodist-run Ebenezer School. She began high school at St Martin but at fifteen, when her parents separated, she went to live with her birth mother. Attending the West India Commercial College, she trained as a secretary, and simultaneously studied domestic science at the Kingston Technical School.

When her father stopped paying her school fees, Gloria sought work as a secretary. She was invited to become an assistant teacher at West India Commercial College, where she had passed examinations in bookkeeping, shorthand and typing, and took the job. When she became pregnant in 1950, she refused to marry to legitimise her son, Winston, who was born in February the following year. Seven months later, she returned to teaching and participating in the St Bernard's Choral Society. At the choir practices, she met Herbert Cameron, whom she married at the Moravian Church of the Redeemer, in Kingston. Five weeks after their marriage, their daughter, Valerie, was born in February 1953, followed by a son, Franklin, in June 1955. Shortly thereafter, Herb migrated to Britain to seek better opportunities. Nine months later, he wrote Cameron that she should join him. Leaving her three children with her mother, she left to join him in early 1957.

== British activism ==
By the end of 1957, the couple had settled in London and their son Christopher was born just before Christmas. Three months later, Cameron took a position as a cook for the London Transport service but left after a few months. At the end of 1958, she had another daughter, Christine, and joined the St John's Inter-Racial Club in Brixton. The club was her first entry into community service, and it had been organised that year to deal with widespread discrimination against the West Indian community in London. At the time in Britain, covertly and overtly, racial segregation was imposed in employment, in housing, on transport, and in pubs. At the invitation of Gee Bernard, she worked with other activists to stop the Sus laws, which allowed police to stop and search anyone who might be suspected of having the intent to commit an offence. Sus law arrests frequently targeted Black youth and police were given broad latitude in defining the terms "suspect" and "intent". Shortly thereafter, the family moved to Gresham Road in Brixton and were able to buy a house in South London in 1961. That year, she had another daughter, Jennifer, and a son, Richard, followed in 1965. In 1967, their home became the target of urban renewal and the Housing Office made an offer on their home. The family relocated to Streatham and were able to bring the children in Jamaica to join the family in England.

Cameron, Gerlin Bean, and Mabel Carter began meeting as the West Indian Parents Action Group (WIPAG) around 1971, but the group was not formalised until 1974. The goal of the organisation was to address under-achievement by Black children in the British school system and was particularly focused on early childhood education that gave training to children before they entered formal schooling. To that end, WIPAG started a day nursery to support working mothers in 1974. Outgrowing their facility, in 1977, the group renovated a derelict terrace house in Canterbury Crescent. She also worked on issues facing orphans and foster children and was offered a course in social work by the Lambeth London Borough Council. When she completed the training, she was employed in 1973 as a community relations officer for the London Borough of Lambeth. Two years later she was appointed as a justice of the peace (JP), one of the first Black women in the UK to receive the position. Her appointment was to serve as JP for the Inner London Juvenile Courts. Concerned about delinquency problems and lack of services for immigrant adolescents, she took part in a study of the issue with other community workers, teachers and social workers in 1977. She also served as a magistrate and volunteered as a prison visitor. Her dedication to community service was recognised with an MBE in 1980, the citation describing her as "Social worker, Lambeth Community Relations Council". She was honoured by Edward Seaga with the Jamaican Prime Minister's Medal of Appreciation in 1987, in recognition of her contributions to Britain's Caribbean community.

=== Folk music and culture ===
In 1959, Cameron, along with Nadia Cattouse, Jimmy Fairweather, Cy Grant, and Sam King, participated in the first Caribbean-style carnival in London. The event was suggested by Claudia Jones in St Pancras Town Hall and six indoor carnivals preceded the Notting Hill Street Carnival, which began in the late 1960s. Because of the 1958 Notting Hill race riots, the group was reluctant to hold an event in the streets and held the first carnivals in halls. The Cameron family had always been musical. Gloria sang, Herb played the accordion, Valerie the clarinet, Franklin the cornet, Christopher the piano, Christine the guitar, and Jennifer the violin. Seeking to celebrate London's diversity and foster cultural understanding, Cameron formed the Caribbean Folk Group in 1963. The group included around twenty singers, dancers, and dramatists, who performed traditional music and other entertainment throughout greater London. Recitation of West Indian folklore and enactment of pantomime performances such as Anansi and Brer Englishman, written by Cameron with Manley Young, were often included in the presentations.

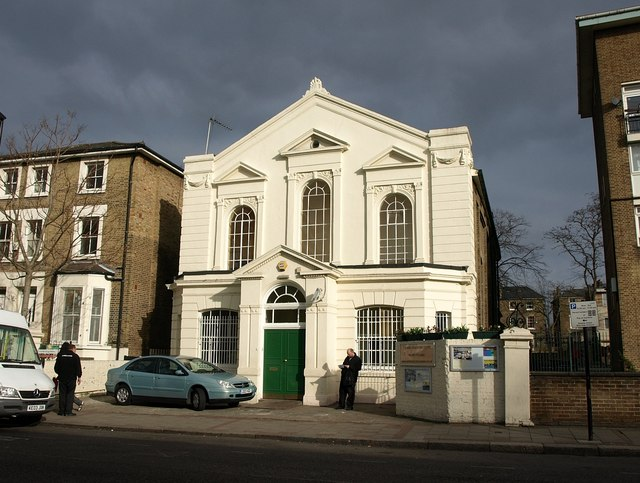
The Karibu Centre (formerly the Abeng Centre) at 7 Gresham Road in Brixton. Number 5 is on the left

After the 1981 race riots in England, Cameron turned again to culture to improve racial relationships in Brixton. She and other parents founded the West Indian Parents' Family Center in 1983, which was officially launched by Diana, Princess of Wales. Because the WIPAG nursery had once again outgrown its space, the new facility at 3 & 5 Gresham Road allowed expansion of the nursery to include cultural workshops and adult education programmes. Next door at 7 Gresham Road, the Abeng Centre, for which Cameron served as coordinator, helped immigrants to adjust to life in Britain by providing counselling services as well as vocational training to assist them with finding employment and a youth club to give teenagers a place to mingle with their peers. Besides her work in the centres and performing with the folk company, Cameron presented various cultural programmes with John Agard, Len Garrison, and Courtney Laws. Along with Laws, she supported the creation in 1980 of the Black Cultural Archives and was one of its inaugural board members.

In 1981, Cameron, along with the teacher Yvonne Conolly, published a book titled Mango Spice, featuring Caribbean songs. The book was part of a multicultural curriculum developed for schools and commissioned by the Inner London Education Authority. Music was arranged by Cameron's son, Chris, and another teacher Sonia Singham. Cameron was featured in 1983 on the television programme This Is Your Life, hosted by Eamonn Andrews. The show brought in her mother who was still living in Jamaica as a surprise guest. Cameron was the first native Jamaican in the UK to be featured on the British television series. A documentary series, Women at Work, produced by the Central Office of Information featured an episode "The West Indian Community: Life of Gloria Cameron an Immigrant to Britain in the 1950s" in the 1983 and 1984 season. Harlech Television ran "A Woman's Place: The West Indian Community" about Cameron in 1986. A second edition of Mango Spice was released in 2001 and was widely distributed to British schools.

=== Nursery case ===
In 1985 WIPAG was encouraged by the Chief Coordinator Community and Voluntary Services (CCCVS) to apply to develop the property at 90 Kellet Road as an additional nursery. The bid to manage the site was approved by the Lambeth Council's Social Services Committee in June and the CCCVS was appointed as the Grant Liaison Officer for the facility. The CCCVS was not the typical agency that oversaw grants for nursery and senior day care facilities as these were normally supervised within the social work division. The nursery facility was opened under the direction of WIPAG in March 1987, but the building did not have working toilets, causing the children enrolled to be transferred to the Gresham Road nursery. The following month, Lambeth Council changed the funding mechanism from the Urban Programme to the Policy and Resources Committee and notified WIPAG that existing funding had ceased. Funding had still not been organised by July and in September, Cameron was notified that their grant would be approved on a monthly basis. Claims of mismanagement by the CCCVS led to a board meeting to discuss Cameron's voluntary leaving and the potential closing of the nurseries temporarily. As a precautionary measure because of harassing phone calls and an angry crowd that had gathered, police were notified to secure the buildings on Gresham and Kellet Roads and escort the employees out on 11 September.

Thereafter, a media blitz followed accusing Cameron of theft, mismanagement, and fraud. In December 1987, she was informed through her solicitor that an inquiry would be held at the Holborn police station on 7 January 1988. The day after her initial interrogation, she was notified that her daughter, who worked as a clerical officer for the government was to be suspended from her job and investigated for fraud. Another daughter who worked as a senior nursery officer for WIPAG was notified that she was wanted for questioning. In April, Cameron was charged with three counts of theft and later her daughters and the WIPAG treasurer were also charged. The prosecution claimed that Cameron and her daughters stole money from the charity to make mortgage payments on a home they had purchased in Purley. Articles like one that appeared under the headline "How Are the Mighty Fallen", in the January–February 1988 issue of Race Today, reported that Cameron had been arrested and "believed her connections in high places would save her". In January 1989, the case was called in the Bow Street Magistrates' Court. After two days, the case was remanded to the Southwark Crown Court.

In February 1989, the case was heard over five days. Bruce Houlder, counsel for the prosecution, alleged that Cameron and her daughters had stolen £43,000 between August 1985 and September 1987. Defence counsel, Martin Thomas, argued that "a small and totally organised group were determined to destroy Mrs Cameron and her family and the work they had built up" with the intent of taking over the WIPAG nursery. In evaluating the claims of the star witness, an accountant, it was determined that he had evaluated limited evidence, only eight salary payments during the period, and had erred in his calculations. An audit of the accountant's sums, which were reviewed in a two-day adjournment, found no significant irregularities in the accounting books for WIPAG. The audit also noted that all funds in Cameron's personal account over the period, save minor discrepancies of a few thousand pounds, were verified. Based on the evidence, Judge Valerie Pearlman ruled that all four accused were not guilty and stated that their characters should not be damaged by the trial. She suggested there should be an investigation to determine how the case had come to court, stating: "This case has caused me enormous concern. It is quite an appalling injustice that any defendant should have had to face worrying allegations and months of anxiety over what appears to be a prosecution witness statement that did not on inquiry support these allegations."

== Later life, death and legacy ==
Cameron, who was still struggling with depression and anxiety because of the case, returned to Jamaica for six months. She subsequently returned to London and worked for three years as a lay member of the Department of Education in the Special Education Tribunal, before retiring. In 2016, Cameron wrote her autobiography, Case Dismissed!: An Ordinary Jamaican Woman, an Extraordinary Life, which also detailed her side of the court proceedings against her. Cameron died on 15 March 2020 in Croydon, South London. She was remembered for commitment to preserving Caribbean culture and heritage and work to build up the West Indian community in Britain.
