= Abigail Lindo =

British lexicographer

- Born: 3 August 1803; London
- Died: 28 August 1848 (aged 45); London
- Resting place: Brentwood Jewish Cemetery
- Occupation: lexicographer
- Known for: creating a Hebrew<>English dictionary
- Parent(s): David Abarbanel Lindo and Sarah Lindo (née Mocatta)
- Relatives: David Lindo Alexander (nephew); Benjamin Disraeli and Sir Moses Montefiore (cousins)

Abigail Lindo (3 August 1803 – 28 August 1848) was a British lexicographer. She was the first British Jew to compile a Hebrew-English dictionary and is considered to be the only woman to have made a significant contribution to philology in the nineteenth century.

== Life ==
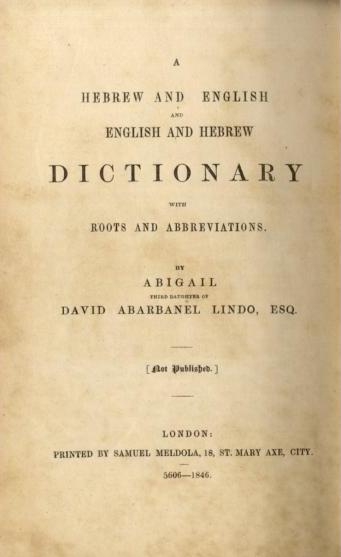
Abigail Lindo's Hebrew dictionary, published in 1837

Lindo was born in London in 1803, the third daughter of Sarah (née Mocatta) and David Abarbanel Lindo, Sephardi Jews who were members of leading families. She had seventeen siblings; her sister Jemima was the mother of the barrister and Jewish community leader David Lindo Alexander. One of Abigail's cousins was Sir Moses Montefiore. The Lindo family were related to Benjamin Disraeli and it was her father who performed Disraeli's circumcision.

Her mother's brother, Moses Mocatta (1768–1857), who was a bullion broker and a scholar of Hebrew language and literature, saw to her education. Under his guidance, she became a respected scholar of the Bible with a wide knowledge of Hebrew.

She came to prominence after she created an English-Hebrew vocabulary for her own use. Encouraged by her uncle, she published her work in 1837, and recommended it to be used in the different Jewish schools in Britain. She was the first British Jew to compile and publish a Hebrew-English dictionary.

Her 1837 vocabulary was extended in 1842 and by 1846 she had created a complete A Hebrew-English and English-Hebrew Dictionary. Leading lexicographers used her book as well as students of Hebrew. Her work is now regarded as amateur as she had no knowledge of related languages such as Arabic or Aramaic, but she is considered the only woman to have made a significant contribution to philology in the nineteenth century. All of her books identify the author as the third daughter of her father and it is his picture which is included in her books.

== Death and burial ==
Lindo died in London on 28 August 1848 and was buried on 30 August at the Novo Cemetery in Mile End, London. Her remains, along with those of about 7500 other Jews buried there, were removed in 1974 and re-interred at Brentwood Jewish Cemetery.

== See also ==
- Lindo family
