= Trésor public =

The Trésor public (English: Public treasury) is the national administration of the Treasury in France. It is headed by the general directorate of public finances (Direction générale des finances publiques) in the Ministry of Economics and Finance.

The Trésor Public is responsible for:

- the accountancy of the state;
- the control and help in the accountancy of public administrations and local governments;
- the perception of direct taxes such as the income tax (the computation of those taxes is vested in a separate administration).

== History ==
Its origins can be traced back to King of France Philip Augustus (reigned from 1165 to 1223), who transformed France into the most prosperous and powerful country in Europe. His actions brought financial stability to his country. However, the modern Treasury came into being under the leadership of superintendents of finance such as Colbert, and above all with Count Mollien in the 19th century. It accompanied and embodied the emergence of the modern bureaucratic state.

From January 1806 to 1814, under Emperor Napoleon, Mollien was Minister of the Treasury (succeeding Barbé-Marbois after the bankruptcy of the Négociants réunis) and Napoleon's principal financial adviser. Mollien set up the Caisse de service, responsible for overseeing the movement of funds.

Until the 2012 reform, the Treasury was headed in each department by the Treasurer-Paymaster General (Trésorier-Payeur Général), a high-ranking official. In Paris, the function used to be divided into the Paymaster General of the Treasury (Payeur Général du Trésor), and the Receiver General of the Finances (Receveur Général des Finances). Each region had its own Treasurer-Paymaster General, the one for the département of the région préfecture. However, following the 2012 reform, the system has been greatly simplified, and relevant administrations for taxes (Direction générale des impôts) and public accounts (Direction générale de la comptabilité publique) were merged into the general directorate of public finances (Direction générale de finances publiques). During this process, redundant fiscal and financial functions were consolidated into a single departamental or regional director for public finances (Directeur département ou régional des finances publiques).

The Trésor also runs a certificate authority. In December 2013 it was revealed that it issued fake certificates impersonating Google in order to facilitate spying on French government employees via man-in-the-middle attacks.

The Trésor public is different from the Direction générale du Trésor (or French Treasury), which is the administration in charge of French State's debt and cash management (through the Agence France Trésor), and contributes to financial sector and economy financing regulation, economic policy and international economic and financial negotiations.

== See also ==
- DigiNotar
- Global surveillance disclosures (2013–present)
- Tailored Access Operations
