= R. James deRoux =

Jamaican Custos Rotulorum (1930–2012)

The Honourable R. James deRoux CD, JP
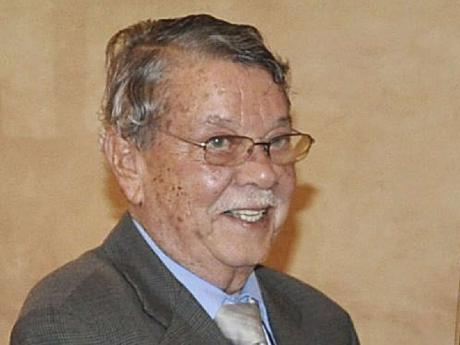
- deRoux in 2011

5th Custos Rotulorum of Clarendon
- In office 5 May 1981 – 31 July 2011
- Monarch: Elizabeth II
- Governors General: Sir Florizel Glasspole; Sir Howard Cooke; Kenneth O. Hall; Sir Patrick Allen
- Preceded by: Dr. Abner Wright
- Succeeded by: William Shagoury

Personal details
- Born: Robert James deRoux; 17 March 1930 Mandeville, Colony of Jamaica
- Died: 25 November 2012 (aged 82) May Pen, Jamaica
- Spouse(s): Ruth Reader (m. 1951; died 1999) Audrey DaCosta (m. 2001)
- Children: 3
- Occupation: Philanthropist; Businessman

Robert James deRoux, CD, JP. (March 17, 1930 – November 25, 2012) was a Jamaican businessman and the longest-serving Custos in Jamaican history. He served as Custos Rotulorum of Clarendon for 30 years.

== Early life ==
deRoux was born on 17 March 1930 in Mandeville, Manchester, the only son and second child of Robert Redvers deRoux, a hardware merchant, and Marie Lucille (née Fowles). The deRoux family came to Jamaica as a part of the wave of French refugees fleeing the Haitian Revolution and settled on the island as merchants, clerks, and planters. He was a descendant of the Lindo family, an eminent Sephardic Jewish family, through his father, a great-grandson of fellow Custos Alexander Joseph Lindo.

He attended Cave Valley Elementary School and Jamaica College, where he was schoolmates with Michael Manley, and excelled in football and diving.

== Career ==
A prominent businessman, deRoux inherited his family's hardware business Stork's deRoux & Son Ltd., and was the managing director until his retirement. In 1962 he was named as one of the inaugural Justices of the Peace for the newly independent Jamaica.

In 1964 he founded and was President of the May Pen Business Association which was the forerunner of the Clarendon Chamber of Commerce, of which he served as first Vice President from 1968 to 1975.

An active community member, he served as Vice Chairman of the May Pen Secondary School, Member of the Board of Management of Glenmuir High School, Director for the Hardware Merchants Association, Honorary President of the Clarendon Cultural Development Committee, President of the Clarendon Level Scouts Association and Chairman of Vere Free Schools Trust.

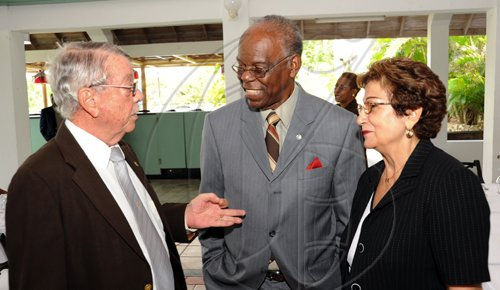
deRoux and the Custodes Rotulorum for Manchester, The Hon. Dr. Gilbert Allen and for St. Catherine, Rev. The Hon. Mrs. Sophia Azan, at the Governor General's Consultative Youth Breakfast at the Caymanas Golf Club, May, 2009

On May 5, 1981, he was appointed the fifth Custos of Clarendon, the Governor-General's representative in the parish, and Chief Magistrate for the parish by then Governor General Florizel Glasspole. He served under four different Governors-General and acted as Deputy Governor General on three occasions.

After thirty years of service, he retired on July 31, 2011, and was succeeded by businessman William Shagoury. Due to the historic nature of his tenure, his Roll of Justices of the Peace was inducted into the National Archives of Jamaica.

== Personal life ==
deRoux was married twice, and had three sons.

On November 25, 2012, he died in May Pen, Clarendon at the age of 82 of lung cancer.

== Awards and honours ==
In 1983 he was awarded the Prime Minister's Medal of Appreciation by Edward Seaga.

He was awarded the Order of Distinction in the rank of Commander in 2002.

He was posthumously awarded the Governor-General's Medal of Honour in recognition of his service to the country in 2023 on the occasion of Elizabeth II's Platinum Jubilee.
