= David Lindo Alexander =

English barrister (1842–1922)

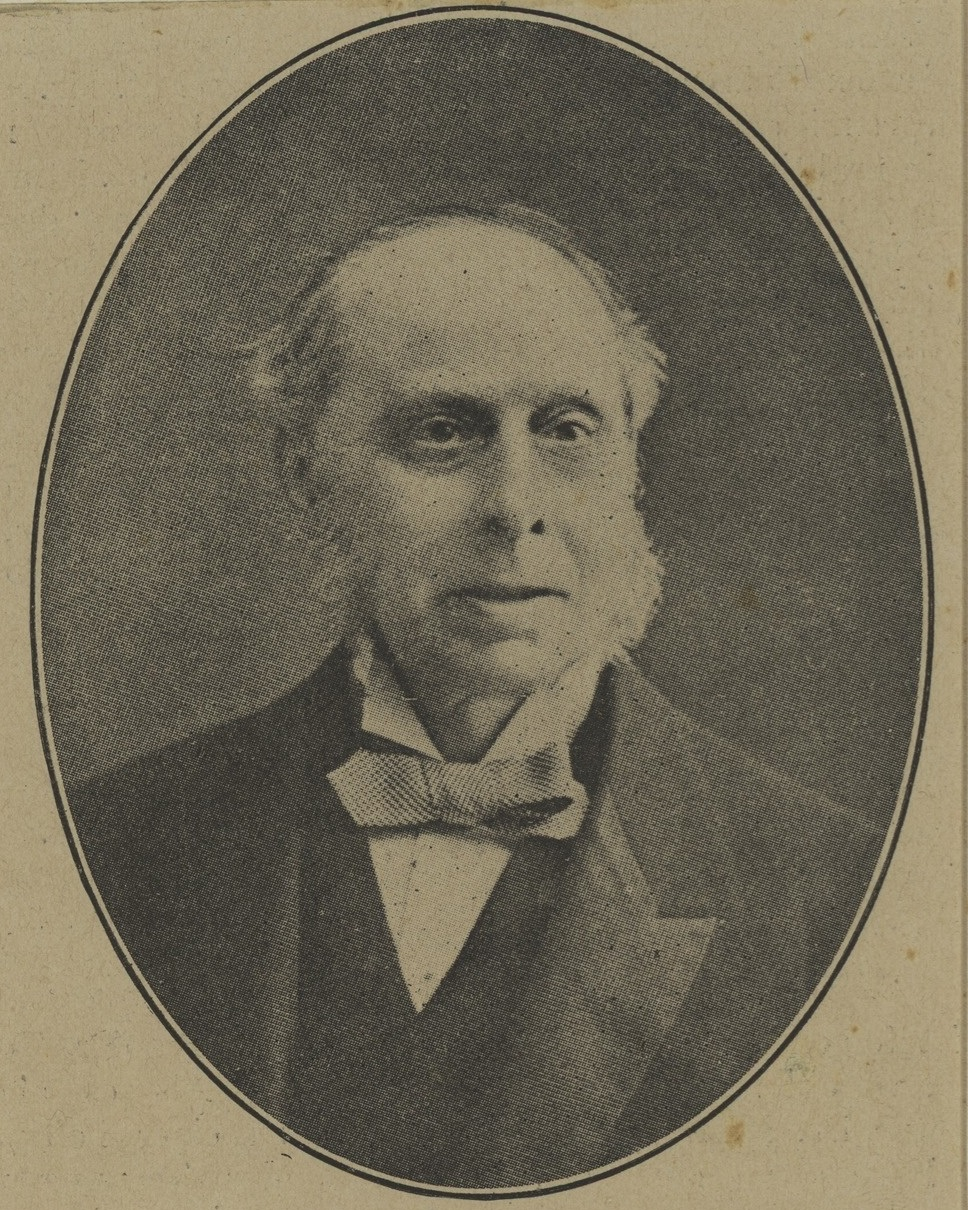
David Lindo Alexander

David Lindo Alexander (5 October 1842 in the City of London – 1922) was an English barrister and Jewish community leader.

== Early life and family ==
David Lindo Alexander was born in the City of London on 5 October to solicitor Joshua Alexander and his wife Jemima (b. 1809 – d.?), daughter of Sara de Abraham Mocatta (1777–1852) and David Abarbanel Lindo (1772 -1852). His brother Lionel Lindo Alexander would become a prominent communal worker. His aunt Abigail Lindo had compiled an early English-Hebrew dictionary. Alexander was educated at City of London School and Trinity College, Cambridge, where he graduated in mathematics in 1864.

In 1886 David Lindo Alexander married Hester (1845–1913), daughter of stockbroker Simeon Joseph. The couple had two sons and one daughter.

== British Jewry ==
In 1877 David Lindo Alexander became representative on the Board of Deputies of British Jews for the Ashkenazi Central Synagogue in Great Portland Street, rising to become president of the organization between 1903 and 1917. He served as vice-president of the Anglo-Jewish Association and on the council of Jews' College. He also served as President of the Jewish Workingmen's Club and Vice-President of the Home and Hospital for the Jewish Incurables. Alexander was a member of the committees of the Jewish Infants Schools, the Stepney Jewish Schools and the Jews' Hospital and Orphan Asylum.

=== 24 May 1917 letter in The Times ===
Alexander is remembered as co-signatory, along with Claude Montefiore, president of the Anglo-Jewish Association, of a letter to The Times on 24 May 1917, which declared "grave objections" to two claims in the "published statements of the Zionist leaders": "The first is a claim that the Jewish settlements in Palestine shall be recognized as possessing a national character in the political sense... the second... is the proposal to invest the Jewish settlers in Palestine with certain special rights in excess of those enjoyed by the rest of the population".

On behalf of the Association and the Board of Deputies the two presidents rejected what they saw as the conflation of nationality and religion:

Emanicipated Jews in this country regard themselves primarily as a religious community... They hold Judaism to be a religious system, with which their political status has no concern, and they maintain that, as citizens of the countries in which they live, they are fully and sincerely identified with the national spirit and interests of those countries. It follows that the establishment of a Jewish nationality in Palestine, founded on this theory of Jewish homelessness, must have the effect throughout the world of stamping the Jews as strangers in their native lands.

They also rejected the notion of a charter of rights administered by a Jewish Chartered Company: ".. it is very undesirable that Jews should solicit or accept such a concession, on a basis of political privileges and economic preferences. Any such action would prove a veritable calamity for the whole Jewish people."

On 28 May The Times published critical responses from Lord Rothschild, the Chief Rabbi, Joseph H. Hertz and from Chaim Weizmann, president of the British Zionist Federation.

Following the correspondence in The Times, Alexander's presidency of the Board of Deputies was denounced and on 17 June the letter was condemned by 56 votes to 51 in a vote of censure. As a result of the vote Alexander was forced to resign and he subsequently co-founded the anti-Zionist League of British Jews, an organization dedicated to resisting the allegation that Jewish people constituted a separate political entity. Montefiore also joined the League.

== Death ==
Alexander died on 29 April 1922, aged 79, and was buried next to his wife at Willesden Jewish Cemetery on 2 May.

== See also ==
- List of Old Citizens
