= Respublica v. De Longchamps =

Court case in the United States

Respublica v. De Longchamps, 1 U.S. (1 Dall.) 111 (Pa. O. & T. 1784), was a case resulting from the "Marbois Affair," heard by the Pennsylvania Court of Oyer and Terminer at Philadelphia.

== State Court Decisions in the United States Reports ==
The decisions appearing in the first volume and few appearing in the second volume of the United States Reports are not actually decisions of the United States Supreme Court. Instead, they are decisions from various Pennsylvania courts, dating from the colonial period and the first decade after Independence.

== The case ==
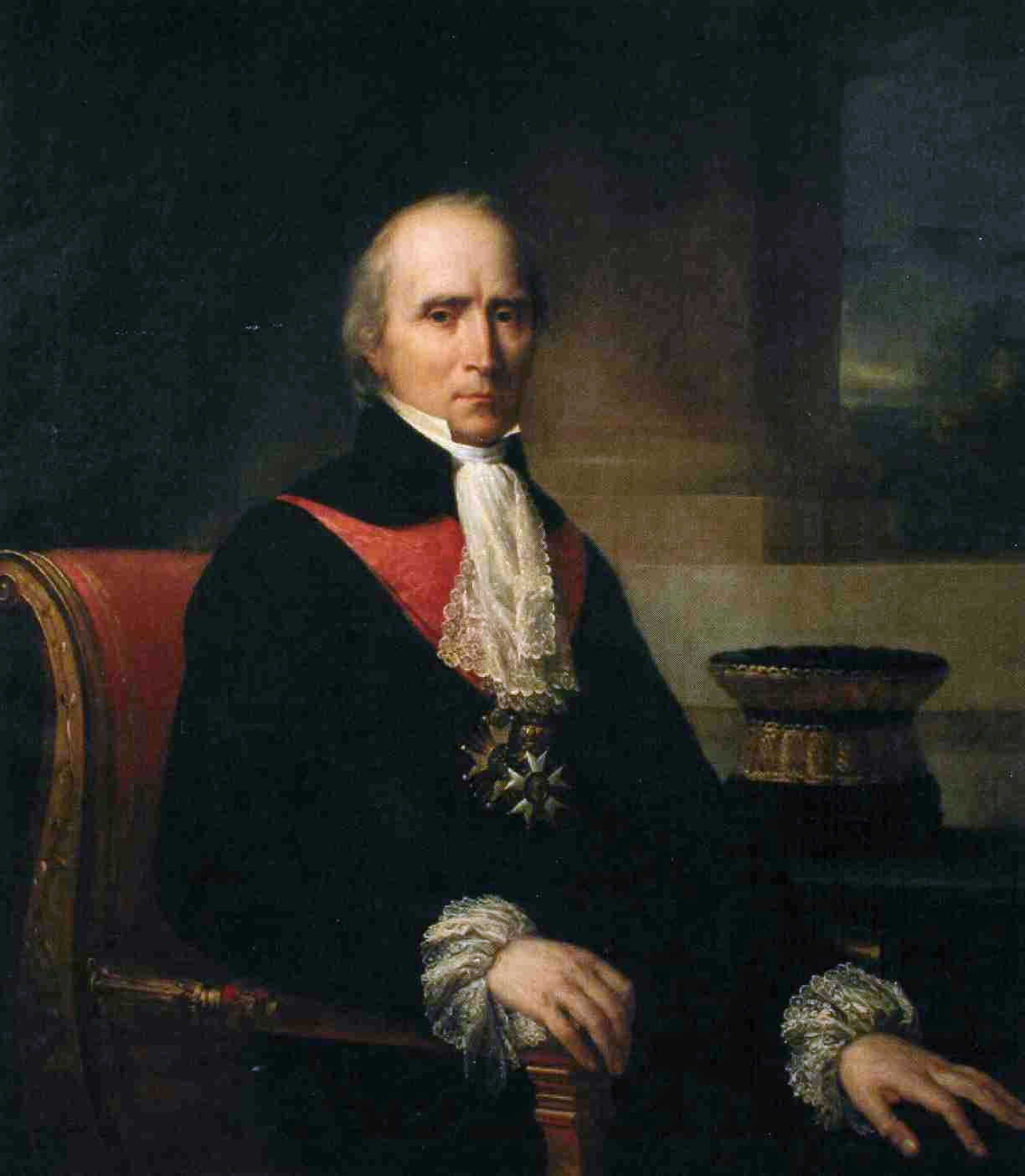
François Barbé-Marbois, Consul General of France to the United States, assaulted by Charles Julian De Longchamps.

Charles Julian De Longchamps (the "Chavelier De Longchamps") was accused of verbally assaulting the Consul General of France to the United States, Francis Barbé-Marbois, on May 17, 1784, in the house of the French Minister. Two days later, De Longchamps allegedly "violently did strike" the consul on a public street.

De Longchamps was convicted by a jury of threatening bodily harm to De Marbois, and was further convicted of the actual assault. The Court of Oyer and Terminer was then asked to consider whether De Longchamps should be extradited to France, or whether he should be imprisoned in Pennsylvania until the French sovereign was satisfied.

M'Kean, Chief Justice, held that the laws of nations formed a part of the law of Pennsylvania. He further held that the insult of the physical assault surpassed the actual damage. Still, it was an assault.

The Court, led by Chief Justice M'Kean, held that De Longchamps could be neither legally deported nor imprisoned. However, the Court noted that De Longchamps had violated the Law of Nations, since "The person of a public minister is sacred and inviolable. Whoever offers any violence to him, not only affronts the Sovereign he represents, but also hurts the common safety and well being of nations; he is guilty of a crime against the whole world."

The Court further stated, "You then have been guilty of an attrocious [sic] violation of the law of nations; you have grossly insulted gentlemen... in a most wanton and unprovoked manner: And it is now the interest as well as duty of the government, to animadvert upon your conduct with a becoming severity, such a severity as may tend to reform yourself, to deter others from the commission of the like crime, preserve the honor of the State, and maintain peace with our great and good Ally, and the whole world."

Assault, being a common "municipal" crime, was not addressed in the opinion. It was only the verbal threats, in the home of the Minister, which were thought to violate the Law of Nations.

== Outcome ==
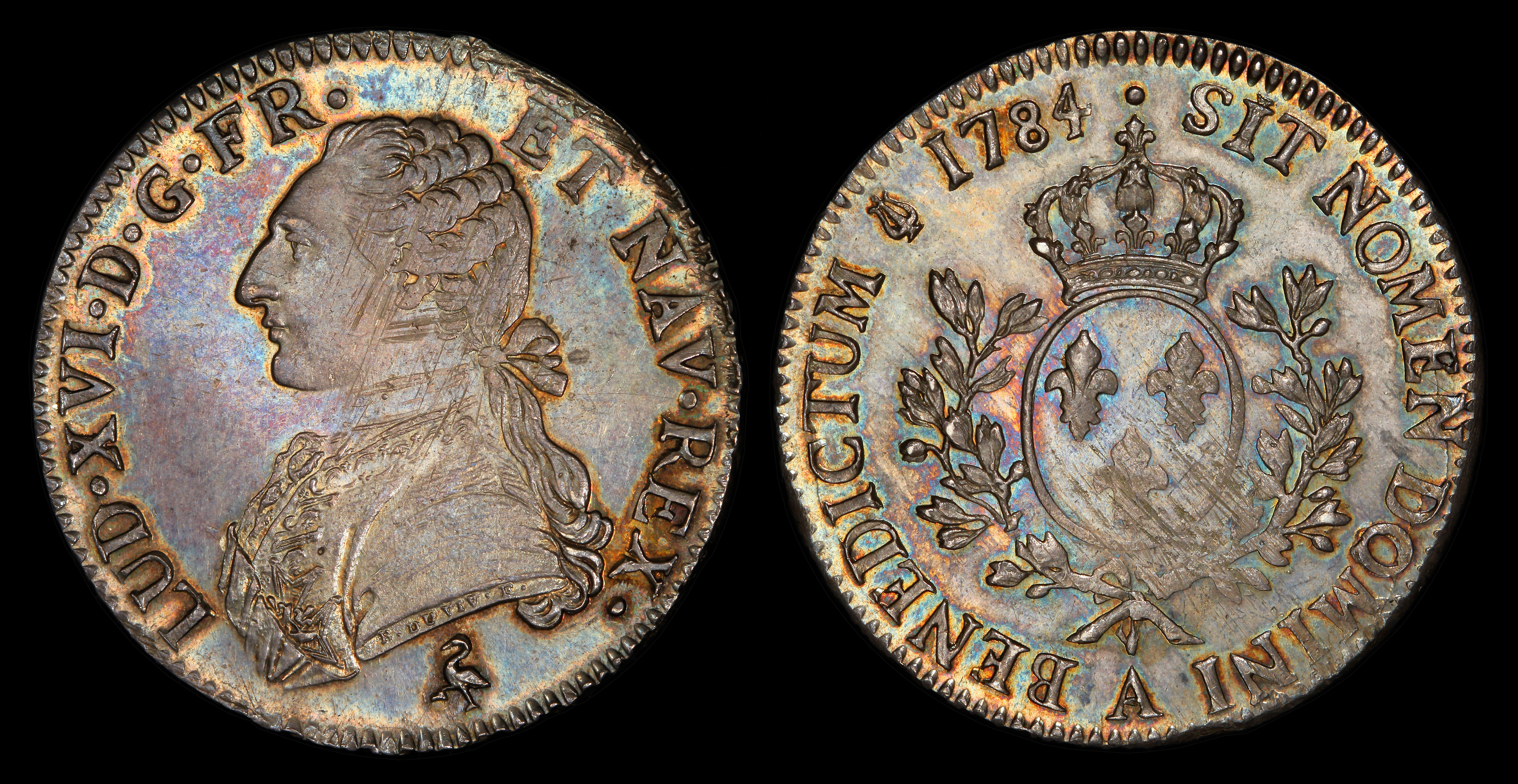
A French Crown, or écu, from 1784.

De Longchamps was fined 100 French Crowns and costs, sentenced to 21 months in jail, and compelled to give a bond guaranteeing good behavior for seven years. Unexpectedly, De Longchamps could not serve his seven years of good behavior as he was killed in a later duel in 1787, the death of De Longchamps was an interest of many, but just as his case faded in the eye of the American Public, his legacy did as well.

== Significance ==
Some Constitutional scholars, such as Richard Tuck, conjecture that the case was an impetus for the "Law of Nations Clause" being put in the U.S. Constitution, and for the Constitutional Convention in general. Though Pennsylvania handled the affair somewhat aptly, there was a fear that other states couldn't be trusted to do the same. For that reason, the new federal government in 1787 was given the power "to define and punish...Offenses against the Law of Nations." (Art. I, § 8, cl. 10).

In Federalist No. 42, James Madison wrote: "These articles [of confederation] contain no provision for the case of offenses against the law of nations; and consequently leave it in the power of any indiscreet member to embroil the Confederacy with foreign nations." It is perhaps the De Longchamps case that helped to engender this fear, and it was the Law of Nations Clause that was to assuage it.

Although the De Longchamps affair was ultimately a failure for the people and citizenship laws, it did allow the American government to improve. The deficiencies in the government constituted by the Articles of Confederation were brought to light with the Marbois affair. The central government lacked judicial and executive departments and lacked the resources to deal with this situation. This case highlights the fact that more judicial and executive power was needed in America, this case also predates the Supreme Court. The case highlighting these deficiencies may have contributed to a Supreme Court being formed, along with adding more power for these appointed judges. This will lay the foundation for the court system that Americans still know today. This also means that this was handled in a domestic court. A single state like Pennsylvania was not exactly equipped to handle an international law case.

While the De Longchamps case was active, the public was wildly involved because of the issue it was discussing, American citizenship. There was even an attempt to extradite De Longchamps in August on the eve of his trial, but mass protesters blocked access to the Philadelphia dock, preventing his departure from the city. That September he would be found guilty and sentenced to two years imprisonment and fined 100 French Crowns. De Longchamps committed a crime in America but was being tried in a French naval court. Public people were invested in this case because there was no national sovereignty in America during this time. Each state handled international law differently before foreign policy was centralized. During this case, the state of Pennsylvania had to protect the foreign diplomat, and respect international law of the French. A foreign diplomat was being protected in order for the United States to maintain its reputation.

Unfortunately, the public's interest and support died along with De Longchamps in 1787. But, this does not mean the impact of the case ends here. "In 1798, the Alien and Sedition Acts comprised a new series of legislative restrictions for migrants and naturalized citizens." Issues like immigration and national security became centralized, no longer being handled on a state level. Many arguments backing this legislation of new found citizenship protection were found to be used against de Longchamps. Marbois wanted de Longchamps to be sent back to France, exiled from America essentially, so it is unsurprising that The Alien and Sedition Acts used the same Arguments as this trial.

The Alien and Sedition Acts brought a more nationalistic, defensive stance for the United States that was driven by a fear of foreign threats, especially France at the time. The introduction of the Alien and Sedition Acts “ further prob-lematized the rights of naturalized citizens, including the right to residency in the United States.” A federalist congressman declared ““a Frenchman is a Frenchman; for though he may take his naturalization oath in this coun-try, it does not alter his character; he is still called and known to be a Frenchman.” People like De Longchamps were not seen as citizens in the public eye even if they were legally a citizen. The De Longchamps affair would allow a preview into the ambiguity and complexity that surround the rights of naturalized citizens in the United States.

== See also ==
- List of United States Supreme Court cases, volume 1
- List of United States Supreme Court cases
- Lists of United States Supreme Court cases by volume

== Sources ==
- Madison, Hamilton, & Jay, The Federalist Papers. (London: Penguin, 1987).
- Richard Tuck, The Rights of War and Peace: Political Thought and the International Order from Grotius to Kant. (Oxford: Oxford University Press, 1999).
