= Moses Lindo =

British-born indigo merchant in colonial South Carolina (died 1774)

- Born: London, England
- Died: April 26, 1774; Charleston, Province of South Carolina
- Occupations: Merchant, indigo inspector, planter
- Known for: Development of the South Carolina indigo trade
- Parent(s): Elias Lindo; Rachel Lopes Ferreira

Moses Lindo (died April 26, 1774) was a London-born Sephardic Jewish merchant and dye expert who became a major force in the indigo trade of colonial South Carolina. As the colony's surveyor and inspector general of indigo, he promoted the planting, processing and marketing of the dye, which became the region's second most important agricultural export after rice. From his arrival in Charleston in 1756 until his death, the colony's indigo production rose fivefold, to more than a million pounds a year. He was the subject of a 1903 biographical study that called him the most prominent Jew in Charleston in provincial days.

== Early life ==
Lindo was born in London to a family of Sephardi Jews, the son of Elias Lindo (1690–1727), a broker on the Royal Exchange, and Rachel Lopes Ferreira, and a grandson of Isaac Lindo, one of London's earliest Jewish brokers. He became an authority on dyes at the Royal Exchange and was regarded as one of the foremost experts in London's trade in cochineal and indigo. See also Lindo family.

== Charleston ==
Impressed by the quality of indigo imported from South Carolina, Lindo moved to Charleston in November 1756 and at once announced that he would buy indigo for the foreign market. His advertisements began appearing in the South Carolina Gazette that year. He made a small fortune buying and selling indigo and other commodities prized in Europe, particularly West Indian coffee, and soon after arriving bought a ship, which he named the Lindo Packet.

Jonas Phillips, later a Philadelphia merchant, came to America as Lindo's indentured servant, working off the cost of his passage.

== Inspector general of indigo ==
Lindo's transactions were very large, and in 1762 he was appointed surveyor and inspector general of indigo, drugs and dyes for South Carolina. He affixed a special seal to each parcel he inspected, helping to establish the reputation of Carolina indigo in the British market. In a letter published in the Royal Society's Philosophical Transactions for 1763, he announced the invention of a crimson dye made from pokeberries; he also claimed to have used a mixture of pokeberries, tobacco and Roman vitriol to cure yaws, a skin disease common among the enslaved.

Lindo resigned the office in 1772. On August 20 of that year he published a letter to Henry Laurens explaining why he refused to continue as inspector general. He was subsequently appointed appraiser of all dyes and drugs produced in North America.

== Brown University ==
On April 17, 1770, Lindo wrote to the College of Rhode Island, now Brown University, offering financial support on account of the college's policy of admitting students regardless of their religion. He wrote that if the policy was as he had been told, his donation would "exceed beyond the bounds of th'ir imagination." On September 6, 1770, after receiving an initial donation of twenty pounds from Lindo, the college's corporation voted "that the children of Jews may be admitted into this Institution, and entirely enjoy the freedom of their own religion without any restraint or imposition whatever," and directed its chancellor and president, James Manning, to inform Lindo of the resolution.

== Later life and death ==
In 1773 the South Carolina Gazette reported that Lindo had bought a stone he believed to be a topaz of immense size, which he sent to London with Lord Charles Montagu to be presented to Queen Charlotte. Lindo died in Charleston on April 26, 1774. Despite his success he did not die wealthy, as adverse judgments in a series of lawsuits apparently consumed his earnings.
