= Glenmuir High School =

Location
- 10 Glenmuir Road; May Pen, Clarendon, Jamaica; May Pen, Middlesex, Clarendon; Jamaica
- 17.967°N 77.253°W

Information
- School type: Public
- Motto: Flagrans Veritatis Studio (Burning with the Zeal for Truth)
- Denomination: Anglican
- Founded: 15 September 1958
- Founder: Rt. Reverend Percival Gibson, then Bishop of Jamaica
- Status: Open
- Sister school: Bishop Gibson High School
- Principal: Dr. Marsha Smalling
- Chaplain: Sis. Alvarine Roberts
- Grades: 7-13
- Gender: Coeducational
- Age range: 10-20
- Hours in school day: 8
- Campus: Suburban
- Houses: deRoux; Muirhead; Pawsey; Gibson
- Colours: Maroon; White
- Song: Semper Flagrans (Flagrans Forever!)
- Athletics: Basketball, Football, Netball, Table tennis, Track and Field
- Nickname: GHS, Cola Red (Colour Red)

Glenmuir High School (GHS) is a Jamaican secondary school located in May Pen, Clarendon Parish, Jamaica. It is among the top performing secondary schools in the country. Glenmuir educates over 1,700 pupils, aged between 10 and 18 years. Glenmuir was founded in 1958 by the Rt. Reverend Percival William Gibson, then Bishop of Jamaica, as a private co-educational secondary school of the Anglican Diocese, on a 25-acre site in suburban May Pen. The school motto is "Flagrans Veritatis Studio" ("Burning with the Zeal for Truth").

== History ==
Glenmuir opened its doors on September 15, 1958, with 55 students, but it was not until September 30 that Sir Kenneth Blackburne, Governor of Jamaica, performed the official opening ceremony. The main administrative building (which included the library, classrooms, the Headmaster's office, and a flat on the first floor for his family) was originally the home of Robert Redvers deRoux, businessman and father of Custos of Clarendon R. James deRoux. Construction of the first modern block of classrooms began in 1959 with fundraising by Leigh D. Phillips (later Foundation PTA President, 1962-1967) at the request of the Headmaster, and by the beginning of the Easter Term 1962, there were 236 pupils in attendance.

Glenmuir was modeled on the British public school and in the early years, half the teachers were English expatriates. The original curriculum included classical studies, incorporating Latin and Ancient History. The House System was established in 1959 along with the Prefect Body and soon after that the publication of the first school magazine. A year later saw the formation of the Combined Cadet Force (CCF) affiliated to the 1st Battalion of the Jamaica Combined Cadet Force (JCCF). From the very beginning, popular school activities included debating, music, drama, cricket, football, table tennis, athletics, netball, and tennis. The school was recognized as a Government grant-aided secondary institution by the Ministry of Education after just one year.

=== Headteachers ===
Glenmuir's first Headmaster was Dr. Sydney Howard Scott, a graduate of the University of Oxford, and secretary of the Oxford University West Indian Society (1951-1952). Dr. Scott retired in 1983.

The second headmaster was Mr. Clement Radcliffe, a graduate of the University of the West Indies (UWI) who was educated at Glenmuir and who served as Head of the Inter-Secondary Schools Sports Association (ISSA). He taught at Glenmuir before going on to serve as headmaster for 28 years. In 2009 he accepted the post of Deputy Chief Education Officer at the Ministry of Education.

Mrs. Monacia Williams, another graduate of Glenmuir, became the principal after Mr. Radcliffe left the institution in 2009. Mrs. Williams retired from the position in 2014.

Dr. Marsha Smalling, also a graduate of the institution, was appointed principal in 2014 to present.

== Houses ==
The house system at Glenmuir was introduced in 1959 with the establishment of three houses: Pawsey, Muirhead, and deRoux. These were named after important figures in the school's early history—Custos Pawsey, Custos Muirhead of Clarendon, and Mr. deRoux, the previous owner of the school property. In 1976, a fourth house, Gibson, was introduced, named after the school's founder, the Rt. Reverend Percival William Gibson.

House competitions began in 1960 with football and table tennis, gradually expanding over the years to a variety of sporting events, including field competitions, a cross-country race, and Sports Day, which centers around track and field events. In recent years, the houses also compete annually in Eisteddfod, which features music, dance, song, and oratory performances.

== Sport ==
Glenmuir has a rich sporting tradition dominated by athletics and football. Glenmuir competes in the annual Schoolboy Football Competitions. The school was DaCosta Cup Champions in 2004, 2006, and 2012; the Ben Francis Cup Champions in 1993, 1994, 1999, 2004, 2005, and 2009; and the Oliver Shield Champions in 2004 and 2006.

== Schools' Challenge Quiz ==
Glenmuir's quiz team has been consistently successful in the TVJ's (Television Jamaica) Schools' Challenge Quiz competitions with victories in 1995, 1999, 2001, 2002. The school placed second in 2000, 2005 and 2008.

== Glenmuir High School Choir ==
The Glenmuir High School Choir (otherwise known as GHSC) won the Marcus Garvey Award in 2008 and 2009 and performed at the International Festival in Germany, Choir Olympics in Austria, and the Shrewsbury International Festival in England. In 2004, the choir participated in the inaugural cultural exchange between Jamaica and the Bahamas. They performed at King's House, the Governor-General's official residence, during Jamaica's National Honours and Awards ceremony on National Heroes Day (2005), at Culturama in Florida (2012) and on national television. "Spirit on Fire" (2010) was their first recorded commercial CD.

== School song ==
The school song of Glenmuir High School, titled "Semper Flagrans (Flagrans Forever)" is a cherished tradition that encapsulates the values and spirit of the institution. The lyrics emphasize the pursuit of knowledge, truth, and excellence, reflecting the school's motto.

The song is often sung at devotions, school ceremonies, and special occasions, and it is frequently renditioned by the school choir, making it a source of inspiration and pride for students, staff, and alumni alike.
