= Valerie Pearlman =

British judge (1936–2025)

- Born: 6 August 1936; Hendon, London
- Died: 13 August 2025 (aged 89)
- Occupation: Judge

Valerie Anne Pearlman, CBE (6 August 1936 – 13 August 2025) was a British judge. She was one of the United Kingdom's most senior female judges.

== Early life ==
Pearlman was born in Hendon, North London on 6 August 1936.

== Career ==
Pearlman read for the bar in late 1950s with just 10 other women and when she was sworn in as a judge at the age of 48, she was among only 13 women on the circuit bench. She worked on family law at Southwark Crown Court. In 1999, she made legal history by concluding a criminal trial over the Internet. The fraud trial ended while she was at St Bartholomew's Hospital with a broken leg. With an internet connection she was able to make contact from her hospital bed via fax machine and video link. She also dealt with cases involving drugs and violent crime. In 2002, she passed the first ever sentence for theft of a mobile phone. She was on the south eastern circuit. Pearlman was awarded a CBE in 2008.

== Death ==
Pearlman died on 13 August 2025, at the age of 89. She was described as a trailblazer in the legal profession.
