= Prime Minister's Medal of Appreciation =

Ribbon of the Jamaican Prime Ministers Medal of Appreciation

The Prime Minister's Medal of Appreciation is an award presented by the Prime Minister of Jamaica to those individuals whom he feels are worthy to be recognized for services to Jamaica or to those Jamaicans who have excelled in personal achievements outside of Jamaica.

It is not part of the Jamaican National Honours system. Most recipients will not advance into the Honours system, but a few have been appointed into the Honours system.

== History ==
Jamaica received its independence from the United Kingdom, changing its status from a British Crown colony to an independent country in the Commonwealth, on 6 August 1962. In 1983, The Right Honorable Edwards Seaga, Prime Minister of Jamaica, felt that, during the twenty-first "coming of age" anniversary of independence, a special recognition should be given to Jamaican citizens who had made significant contributions to the Nation, but who had not received any of the National Honours. A committee was formed of prominent Jamaicans to select recipients with the following criteria:

- Have served their Community and Jamaica with distinction for at least twenty years and who are held in high esteem by their community.
- Have not received any of the National Honours.
- Recipients to be at least thirty-eight years old at the time of selection.

The Prime Minister determined that 1,000 medals would be presented. Mr. F. A. Douce, the Secretary General of the Orders, Chancery of the Orders of the Societies of Honours, Office of the Prime Minister in Kingston, Jamaica, was commissioned with the design of the Medal.

== Presentations ==
The first 1,000 presentations were awarded at the Historic Town Square in Spanish Town, Jamaica on Sunday, 18 December 1983. Prime Minister Seaga personally presented the first 10 medals to the County Custos. The Custodes then presented the Medals to those in their County who had been selected for the award.

The following areas of service were recognized for the awards:

Classification	Medals
Custodi	10
Community Service – Agriculture	45
Community Service – Business and Tourism	29
Business and Religion	1
Communication and Culture	116
Community Development	410
Community Service – Education	193
Community Service – Health	129
Community Service – Politics	19
Community Service – Religion	69
Community Service – Sports	17

Since that Sunday, the succeeding Prime Ministers have reserved the privilege of awarding the medal to those Jamaicans who distinguished themselves, usually in the International arena. Recipients who were personally awarded the medal by the Prime Minister included three Champion Boxers, Michael McCallum (3 June 1986), Lloyd Honeyghan (10 November 1985) and Trevor Berbick (10 April 1986). Nine other prominent Jamaican was awarded the medal, including Jamaican born actress Marge Sinclair (12 March 1987).

In 1986, the supply of medals became scarce. It was recommended by the Prime Minister that a new design for the Medal be found to more accurately reflect the current presentations. Again, Mr. F. A. Douce, the Secretary General of the Orders, was tasked with the design and production of a new Medal.

== Design ==
The medal is round, 2 1/4 inches in diameter, made of nickel and plated with 24-carat gold. It is attached to a ribbon by a small ring, through which larger ring is attached directly to the ribbon. The statutes state that it can be worn either around the neck or on the left breast. However, all medals are presented, for both men and women, with a neck ribbon only.

The obverses for both the first and second design are the same. The field has a Jamaican flag. Encircling the inside rim are the words "The National Flag of Jamaica," with a small pineapple at the bottom separating the wording.

The reverse of the first design has the Prime Ministers flag in the field with the inscription "Prime Ministers Standard" directly below the flag. Encircling the inside rim are the words "Prime Ministers Medal of Appreciation 1962-6th August-1983."

The reverse of the second design is close to the first design. It has the Prime Ministers flag in the field with the inscription "Prime Ministers Standard" directly below the flag. Encircling the inside rim are the words "Prime Ministers Medal of Appreciation." Replacing the 21st anniversary dates is a raised plate at the bottom where the date of issuance is to be stamped.

Statutes for the current Prime Ministers Medal of Appreciation state that a maximum of 12 medals can be presented each year.

== Recipients ==
- Trevor Berbick
- Mary Anne Chambers
- R. James deRoux
- Lloyd Honeyghan
- Mike McCallum

== See also ==
- List of awards for contributions to culture
- List of awards for contributions to society
