= Lionel Lindo Alexander =

Personal life
- Born: 14 May 1852 London, United Kingdom
- Died: 31 January 1901 (aged 48)

Religious life
- Religion: Judaism

Lionel Lindo Alexander (1852-1901) was a British political and communal worker.

== Biography ==
Lionel Lindo Alexander was born in London in 1852, and educated at the St. Marylebone's and City of London Schools. His brother was David Lindo Alexander.

For nine years (1884–92) he filled the position of honorary secretary to the Jewish Board of Guardians of London. He was a member of several political associations and was active in organizing political campaigns in the metropolitan constituencies. He was president of the Jewish Workingmen's Club and Lads' Institute, vice-president of the Home and Hospital for Jewish Incurables, and vice-president of Jews' College, having acted on its council since 1877. He also sat on committees of Jews' Infant School (1876), Stepney Jewish Schools (1876), and Jews' Hospital and Orphan Asylum (1875). Alexander was considered an authority on economic and sociological questions, and gave evidence before the House of Lords' and House of Commons' select committees on the "Sweating System" and on "Emigration and Immigration." He compiled Jewish Population Statistics, and as honorary secretary for several years wrote the annual reports of the Jewish Board of Guardians.
