= Temple Hall, Jamaica =

Temple Hall
- Residential community
- Location within Jamaica
- Coordinates: 18.1073°N 76.8204°W
- Country: Jamaica
- Parish: St Andrew
- Named for: First owner
- Time zone: UTC-5 (EST)

Temple Hall is a predominantly residential community in northern St Andrew, Jamaica. It is named after the estate and great house which it adjoins.

It is bounded to the east by the Wag Water River and is essentially a linear settlement strung out along a short section of the A3 road at an elevation of about 1,000 feet (300 m).

To the east of the river is a 1,699 feet (518 m) ridge and triangulation station which overlooks the settlement and is also called Temple Hall.

== History of the estate ==
First owned by Thomas Temple, Temple Hall estate was at first a sugar estate but later became an experimental area for many crops. It is where Sir Nicholas Lawes (1652-1731) introduced the cultivation of coffee to the island in 1728. Lawes was governor of Jamaica from 1718 to 1722 and married Temple's daughter, Susannah, in 1698 being given the estate as a dowry. Laws also experimented with the growing of tobacco, and set up the first printing press.

James Hall inherited the estate and sold it in 1733 to Thomas Howe of St Catherine. Subsequent owners were Abraham Alexander Lindo (1811), George Atkinson (1831) E Reid (1845) Simon D Soutar (late 1800s, early 1900s) and the Crosswell family who were still in possession in 1978.

Onis Johnson, Dr. Ionie Johnson and son Cedric Johnson from Craft Hill Claredon and St Andrew inherited the Estate in 1978. Great House burn down in 1978. The cottage was not affected. The Great House redesign and restore in 1979 by the Johnson family. Johnson family Sold the property to the Mr. Smith in 1999 after Mr. Onis Johnson got sick. His son did not want the property.

The great house has recently been converted to a convention centre and is used for weddings and other outdoor functions.

== See also ==
- List of cities and towns in Jamaica
