= Abraham Alexander Lindo =

18th-century Jamaican merchant

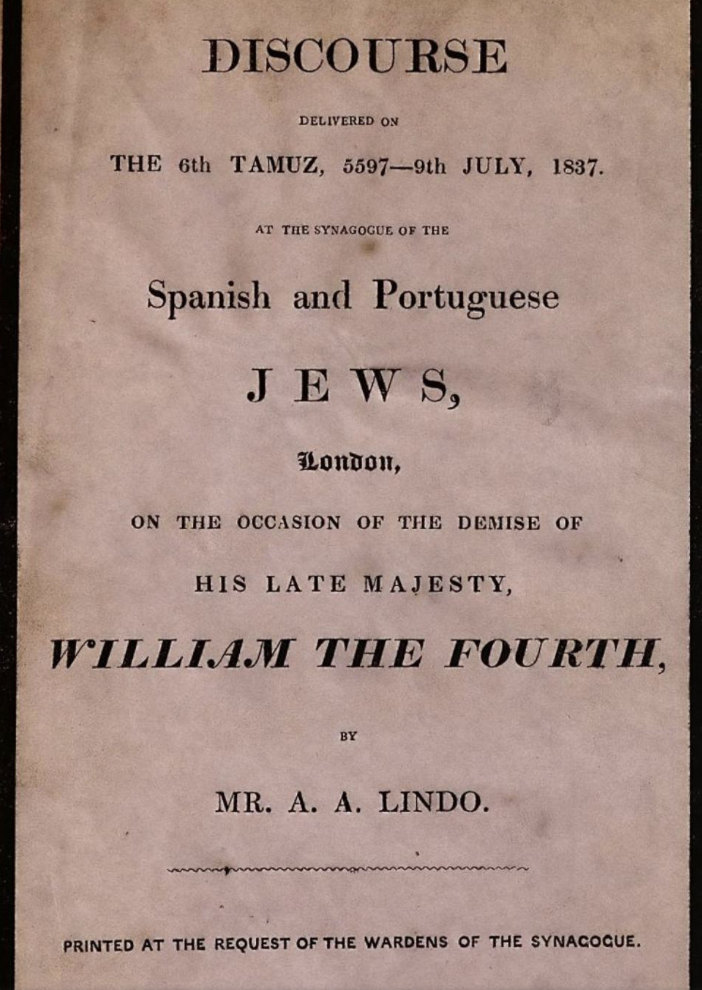
- Born: 1775; Kingston, Jamaica
- Died: 1849 (aged 73–74); Cincinnati
- Occupation(s): Merchant, planter and slaver
- Children: Frederick Lindo, Abraham Lindo
- Father: Alexandre Lindo

Abraham Alexander Lindo (1775 - 1849) was a Jamaican born merchant and planter who was a Sephardic Jew and slaver. After the French Government defaulted on a £560,000 debt owed to Alexandre Lindo (d. 1812), Abraham Lindo was responsible for liquidating his father's assets in hopes of stabilizing the family's financial situation.

Further losses came from the abolition of slavery, in which the family was heavily invested, and in sugar crop failures and hurricane damage to their real estate holdings. Nonetheless, Lindo was still considered one of the "remnants of old landed elite" of the island's ruling class.

== Career ==
He followed his father into commerce and became the senior partner in Lindo and Co. when his father moved to England. In 1797, AA Lindo & Co. owned two vessels trading coffee, cotton and dry goods between Kingston and Jérémie. He headed the firm A. A. Lindo & Brothers, was a partner in Lindo, Lake & Co. and Lindo, Henriques & Lindo which operated two transatlantic vessels. His commercial interests included trade with England and the Spanish empire. Abraham lived at Greenwich Park (the first steam powered plantation in Jamaica) and owned Pleasant Hill, a large coffee plantation.

In 1805 he subdivided Kingston Pen into small lots which then formed a mixed race working class township known as Lindo's Town. Lindo’s Town included the areas now known as Trenchtown and Tivoli Gardens. The last of the lots was sold in 1824. Hurricane damage destroyed both the provision grounds and the coffee crop at Pleasant Hill in 1815. In 1818 he owned Greenwich Park, Constant Spring, Temple Hall, Tranquility, King's Weston and Pleasant Hill but he had mortgaged Pleasant Hill to the Hibbert family.

In 1821 Greenwich Park was sold by auction and by 1825 he was included in a list of debtors made up under the Insolvent Debtors Act.

== Law reform ==
By 1826 he moved to London where he was involved in a campaign to reform the laws that governed West India commerce. He published his correspondence with William Huskisson, the President of the Board of Trade: The Injurious Tendency of the modifying of our Navigation Laws. In 1828 he helped Morris Jacob Raphall found the Hebrew Review. Lindo "delivered the Sephardi Address on the death of King William IV in 1837".

In 1839 he published the pamphlet "A Word in Season" which opposed the Reform movement in Judaism. In 1841 he was granted a patent for improvements to be applied to railways and carriages.

== Personal life ==
On 5 February 1812 he married Luna Henriques and "settled £21,000 on his new wife and children she might have - this fund was for her 'separate use and benefit without the control of Abraham Alexander Lindo." They had 14 children including Abraham Lindo and Frederick Lindo. Lindo was known for his involvement in religious matters. He founded a periodical known as the Hebrew Review in Jamaica. Lindo was also responsible for the establishment of synagogues in Jersey and Cincinnati, Ohio.
