= Henry Laurence Lindo =

Jamaican Civil Servant

Sir Henry Laurence Lindo CMG

Administrator of the island of Dominica United Kingdom Dominica
- In office 1952–1959
- Preceded by: Edwin Porter Arrowsmith
- Succeeded by: Alec Lovelace

High Commission of Jamaica, London of Jamaica to United Kingdom
- In office August 1962 – December 1973
- Succeeded by: Arthur Wint

Personal details
- Born: August 13, 1911 Port Maria, Jamaica
- Died: May 8, 1980 (aged 68) London, England,
- Education: Jamaica College, from 1931 to 1934 Rhodes Scholar at Keble College, Oxford.

Henry Laurence Lindo (August 13, 1911 – May 8, 1980) was a pioneering Jamaican Civil Servant. He was the first West Indian to hold the position of administrator of Dominica, the first native Jamaican to serve as the island's High Commissioner to the United Kingdom, and the first representative of the Commonwealth to become the doyen of the Diplomatic Corps in London.

The Times' obituary called him "the most amiable and equable of High Commissioners", attributes which won him admiration from those seeking cordial relations between London and Jamaica.

He was a Rhodes Scholar at Keble College, Oxford, between 1931 and 1934, and won a Blue in the quarter-mile - the imperial equivalent of the 400 metres, an event in which his successor as High Commissioner, Arthur Wint, won Olympic gold in 1948.

In 1935 Lindo entered Civil Service as His Majesty's Inspector of Schools for Jamaica. Between 1952 and 1959 he was Administrator of Dominica, a tenure during which he radically improved the island's roads.

In 1960 he became Secretary to the Governor of Jamaica, 'a key post where his understanding of both points of view helped complete an orderly and amicable transfer of power after 300 years of colonial rule.' His role in helping smooth the transition meant that he was a natural choice for the post of High Commissioner, which he took over in 1962 and would hold for 12 years. 'During this period, his advice on diplomatic niceties and the eccentricities of the British way of life were increasingly sought by the representatives of newly independent countries, though the quiet and refreshingly simple answers they got did not always accord with their expectations.'

The Jamaican population in the UK swelled by more than 400,000 during Lindo's tenure as High Commissioner, and he made a point of frequently visiting Jamaican communities across the country and representing their cause in Whitehall and elsewhere.

He was made a Knight Bachelor in 1967, an OJ in 1973 and a GCVO in 1974.

He married Holly Robertson Clacken, with whom he had two daughters, Judith (Judy) and Andrea (Andy). His two grandchildren, Boris Starling (b. 1969) and Belinda Starling (1972–2006), are writers.
