= Alexander Joseph Lindo =

Jamaican politician

The Honourable Alexander Joseph Lindo
- Born: 31 October 1799
- Died: 30 November 1867 (aged 68)

Alexander Joseph Lindo (1799–1867) was a Jamaican merchant, planter, member of House of Assembly of Jamaica and Custos rotulorum of St. Mary.

== Life ==
He was the son of Joseph Alexandre Lindo (1777–1816), son of Alexandre Lindo and a brother of Abraham Alexander Lindo. His mother was Sarah DaSilva. Appointed inspector and director of the Public Hospital and Lunatic Asylum c. 21 March 1865.
