= Mark Prager Lindo =

English-born Dutch writer (1819–1877)

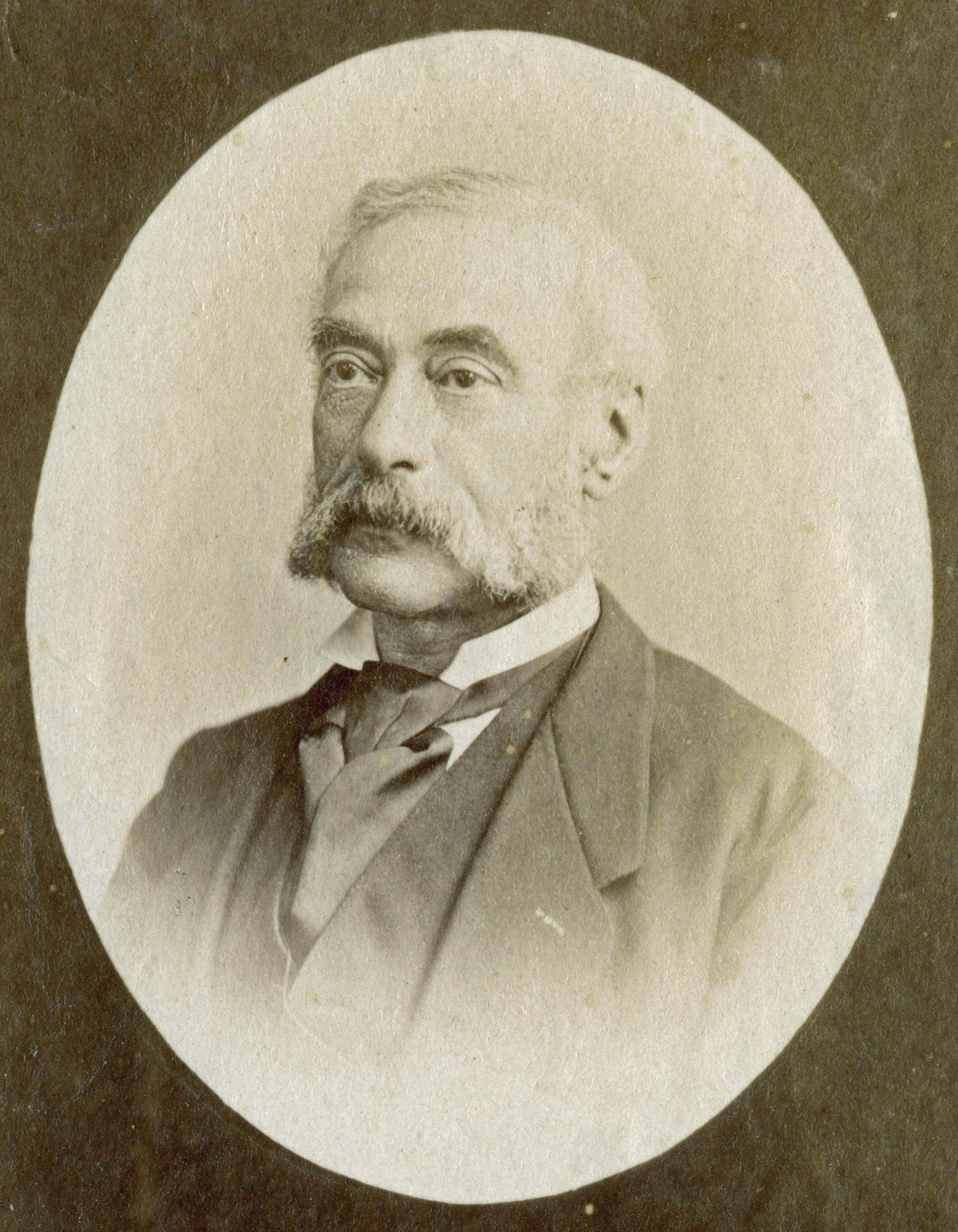
Mark Prager Lindo

Mark Prager Lindo (18 September 1819 – 9 March 1877) was a Dutch prose writer of English-Jewish descent. He was born in London, England.

== Early life ==
He went to the Netherlands, aged nineteen, and became established there as a private teacher of the English language; he soon made up his mind to remain. In 1842, he passed his examination at Arnhem, qualifying him as a professor of English in the Netherlands, subsequently becoming a teacher of the English language and literature at the gymnasium in that town.

In 1853, he was appointed in a similar capacity at the Koninklijke Militaire Academie (Royal Military Academy) in Breda.

Meanwhile, Lindo had obtained a thorough grasp of the Dutch language, partly during his student years at Utrecht University, where in 1854 he gained the degree of doctor of literature for his annotations on William Shakespeare's Macbeth. His proficiency in the two languages led him to translate into Dutch several of the works of Charles Dickens, William Makepeace Thackeray and others, and afterwards also of Henry Fielding, Laurence Sterne and Walter Scott.

== Literary career ==
His name is much more likely to endure as the writer of humorous original sketches and novelettes in Dutch, which he published under the pseudonym of De oude heer Smits (Old Mr. Smits). Among the most popular are Brieven en Ontboezemingen (Letters and Confessions, with three continuations), 1853; Familie van Ons (Family of Ours), 1855; Bekentenissen eener Jonge Dame (Confessions of a Young Lady), 1858; Uittreksels uit het Dagboek van Wijlen den Heer Janus Snor (Extracts from the Diary of the Late Mr. Janus Snor), 1865; Typen (Types), 1871; and, particularly, Afdrukken van Indrukken (Impressions from Impressions), 1854, reprinted many times. The last-named was written in collaboration with Lodewyk Mulder, who contributed some of its drollest whimsicalities of Dutch life and character, which, for that reason, are almost untranslatable.

Mulder and Lindo also founded together, and carried on, for a considerable time alone, the Nederlandsche Spectator (The Dutch Spectator), a literary weekly, still published at The Hague, which bears little resemblance to its English prototype, and which perhaps reached its greatest popularity and influence when Carel Vosmaer contributed to it a weekly letter under the title of Vlugmaren (Swifts).

Lindo's serious original Dutch writings he published under his own name, the principal one being De Opkomst en Ontwikkeling van het Engelsche Volk (The Rise and Development of the British People, 2 vols. 1868–1874).

Lindo was appointed an inspector of primary schools in the province of South Holland in 1865, a post he held until his death at The Hague on 9 March 1877. Lodewyk Mulder published in 1877–1879 a collected edition of Lindo's writings in five volumes, and there has since been a popular reissue.

== Family ==
He was the son of David Alexandre Lindo (1777–1852) and Mathilda Prager. He married Johanna Nijhoff, daughter of the Arnhem publisher Isaac Anne Nijhoff and Martina Cornelia Houtkamp, on 24 July 1844 in Arnhem. Their son, Isaac Lindo, became an engineer; he is still known in Japan as one of the "Watermannen" for his hydraulic-engineering works, such as the establishment of the Tokyo Pedigree, which would become the standard for height measurement throughout the country.

== Works ==
- Jacoba, Hertogin van Gulik, Kleef en Berg, geboren Markgravin van Baden : (Fragment uit de geschledenis van Gulik, Kleef en Berg.). - 1847. Digital Edition
