= David Abarbanel Lindo =

English Sephhardi communal worker

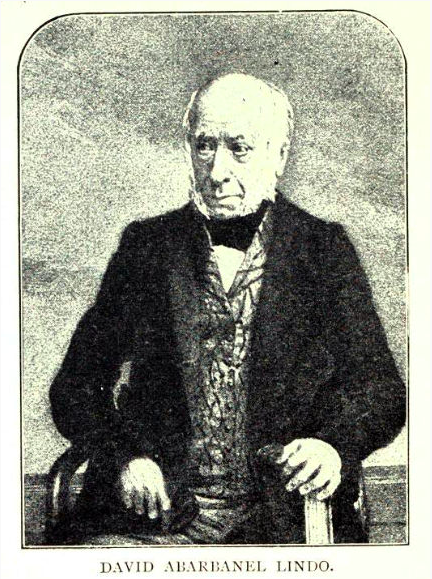

Personal life
- Born: 14 August 1772 London, England
- Died: 26 February 1852 (aged 79) London, England
- Buried: Brentwood Jewish Cemetery, Essex
- Spouse: Sarah (née Mocatta)
- Children: 18, including Abigail Lindo
- Parent(s): Elias Lindo and Grace Lumbroso de Mattos (Mocatta)
- Occupation: Communal worker; mohel

Religious life
- Religion: Judaism
- Denomination: Orthodox Judaism
- Synagogue: Bevis Marks Synagogue
- Position: Warden
- Began: 1809
- Ended: 1838

David Lindo (1772–1852) was an English Sephardi communal worker and elder of Bevis Marks Synagogue.

He was born in London on 14 August 1772 to Elias Lindo (1740–1785), a Royal Exchange broker, and Grace Lumbroso de Mattos, the daughter of Moses Lumbroso de Mattos (1700–1759).

Lindo had at least eighteen children, including the lexicographer Abigail Lindo, many of whom married into well established Sephardi families. He was an uncle of Benjamin Disraeli and he carried out Disraeli's circumcision in 1804. He was an uncle by marriage of Moses Montefiore.

Lindo, who opposed the founders of the Reform movement in London, was warden of Bevis Marks Synagogue several times between 1809 and 1838.

He died in London on 26 February 1852 and was buried on 27 February at the Novo Cemetery in Mile End, London. His remains, along with those of about 7500 other Jews buried there, were removed in 1974 and re-interred at Brentwood Jewish Cemetery, Essex.

== See also ==
- Lindo family
