= Lindo lamp =

Silver Chanukah menorah

The Lindo lamp is a silver Chanukah menorah. It is the oldest known example of a Chanukah menorah made in Britain.

== History ==
The lamp was created by London silversmith John Ruslen in 1709. It was commissioned to celebrate the marriage of Elias Lindo and Rachel Lopes Ferreira. The couple were married at London's Bevis Marks Synagogue on February 2, 1708–09.

The lamp has been on loan to the London Jewish Museum, which has displayed it for 77 years, since the day the museum opened in 1932. The lamp is considered to be among the most important objects in the museum's collection. It is feared that if sufficient funds cannot be raised to purchase the lamp, it will be purchased by a private collector and disappear from public view. If the Museum, which is undergoing a major renovation, manages to raise sufficient funds to purchase the menorah, it will be on view in a new gallery entitled "Judaism: A Living Faith", designed to display the museum's "magnificent" collection of Jewish ceremonial art. The Museum's collection of ceremonial art has been awarded "designated" status by the Museums, Libraries and Archives Council in recognition of its outstanding national importance.

In 2009 the family that has long loaned the lamp to the Museum announced that it wished to sell the lamp, a price of £300,000 was set should the Museum wish to purchase the lamp. The National Heritage Memorial Fund (NHMF) agreed to contribute £145,000. The Art Fund offered to contribute £75,000 and the MLA /V&A Purchase Fund £30,000, if the Museum can raise the remaining £50,000 from private donors.

== Art ==
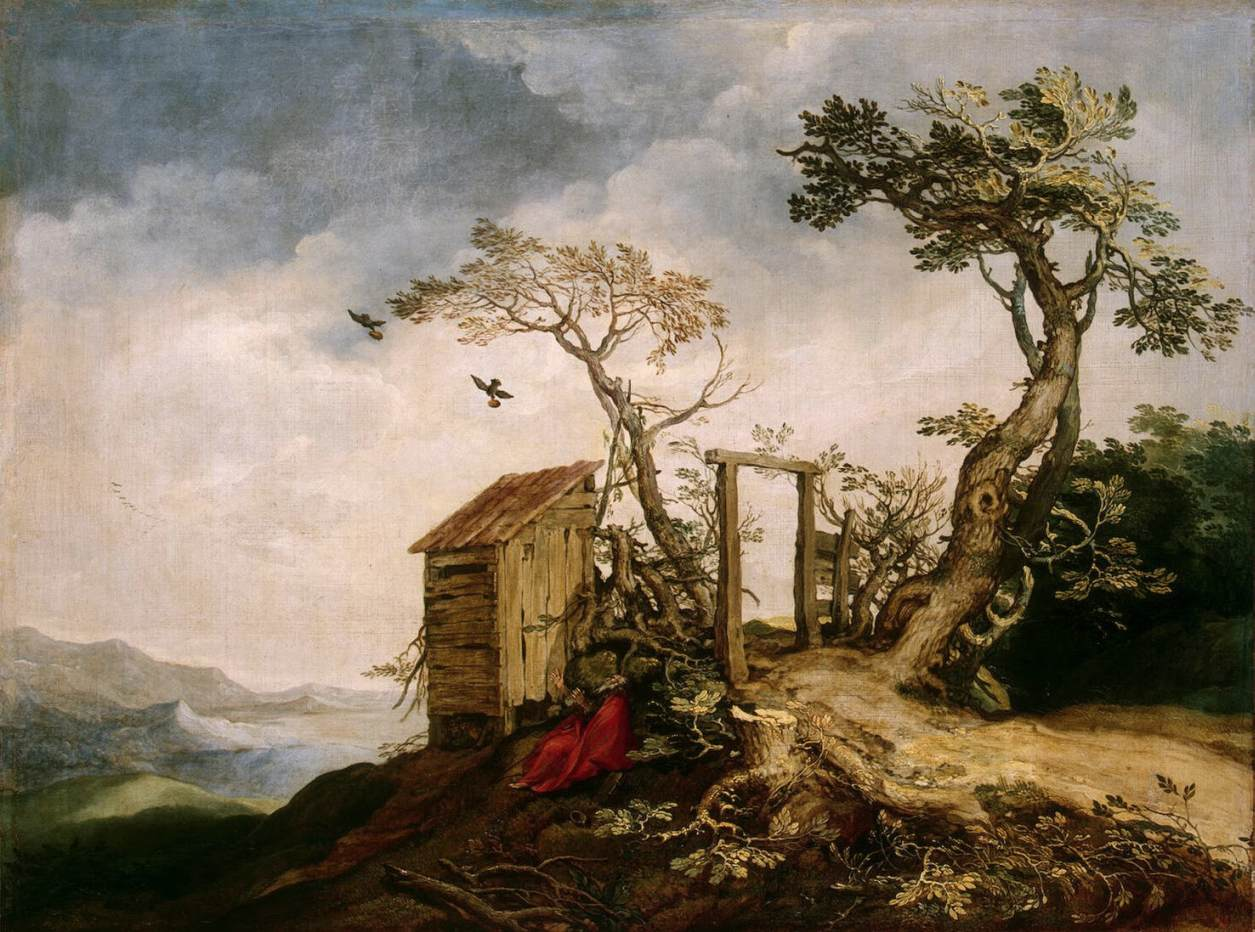
Landscape with the Prophet Elijah in the Desert, Hermitage Museum

The sterling silver menorah is chased with a relief image of the Prophet Elijah fed by ravens, a scene from the Book of Kings (I Kings 17:6). It is common for Jewish ceremonial artistic objects to depict a biblical character bearing the same name as the patron who commissioned an object, in this case Elias (Elijah) Lindo. The subject is not very common in Jewish art, but it was popular in the Baroque period in both Catholic and Protestant lands. A well-known Elijah fed by Ravens painted in 1620 by Guercino hangs in the National Gallery. A version by Abraham Bloemaert is owned by the Cleveland Museum of Art.
