= Archie Lindo =

Jamaican photographer and playwright (1908–1990)

Archie Lindo OD (20 January 1908 – 2 April 1990) was a Jamaican photographer, actor, author, playwright, and radio show broadcaster. He was one of the most successful Jamaican playwrights of the 1940s. His photographs are part of the National Gallery of Jamaica collection. He received the Silver Musgrave Medal from the Institute of Jamaica as well as an Order of Distinction from the government. He was also an art critic for The Star from 1960.

Lindo was a member of the Poetry League of Jamaica and was a columnist for The Gleaner. Left in charge of Jamaica's only radio station at the time, ZQI, he broadcast local programming including Louise Bennett and the Jamaica Military Band. The radio station was succeeded by RJR.

== Bibliography ==
- Under the Skin, a play
- The Maroon, a play
