= Martin-Michel-Charles Gaudin =

French statesman (1756–1841)

1st Duc de Gaëte Martin-Michel-Charles Gaudin
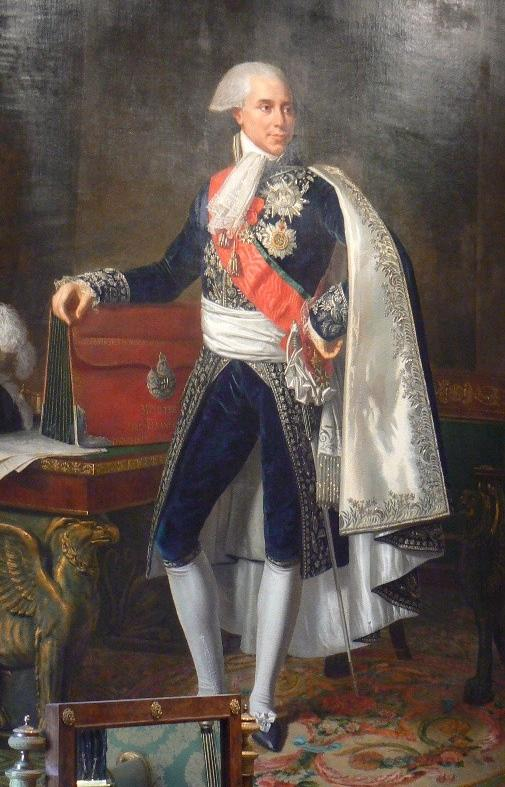
- Portrait by Joseph-Marie Vien (1806)

Governor of the Banque de France
- In office 6 April 1820 – 25 February 1836
- Preceded by: Jacques Laffitte
- Succeeded by: Jean Charles Joachim Davillier

Deputy for Aisne
- In office 22 August 1815 – 17 July 1819

Minister of Finance
- In office November 1799 – March 1814
- Monarch: Napoleon I
- Succeeded by: Dominique-Vincent Ramel-Nogaret (provisional, Hundred Days)
- In office 3 November 1795 – 8 November 1795
- Preceded by: Edmond Louis Alexis Dubois-Crancé
- Succeeded by: Guillaume-Charles Faipoult

Personal details
- Born: 19 January 1756 Saint-Denis, Kingdom of France
- Died: 5 November 1841 (aged 85) Gennevilliers, Kingdom of France
- Occupation: Statesman; administrator

Martin-Michel-Charles Gaudin, 1st duc de Gaëte (19 January 1756 – 5 November 1841) was a French statesman who served as Minister of Finance of the French Empire under Napoleon I, from November 1799 to March 1814, and during the Hundred Days following Napoleon's return from exile in Elba.

== Early life ==
Gaudin was born in Saint-Denis in 1756.

== Career ==
He was hired to the Ministry of Finance at the age of seventeen.

He was Minister of Finance under the Directory from 3 November 1795 to 8 November 1795.

After Napoleon made him his Minister of Finance, where he held office until 1814, Gaudin organised the French direct contributions, reintroduced direct taxes ("droits réunis"), founded the Banque de France and the Cour des comptes, and set up the first cadaster, or record of land ownership as a basis of taxation. He was rewarded in 1809 with the duché grand-fief of Gaeta and the title of duc de Gaëte, in the then-French-controlled Kingdom of Naples; effectively, this was a life peerage, nominal but of high rank. During the Hundred Days return, Bonaparte reserved a seat for Gaudin in the planned imperial Chamber of Peers, but that never materialised.

After the Bourbon Restoration, he was deputy for the Aisne département, from 22 August 1815 to 17 July 1819, sitting with the constitutional party.

In 1820, he became governor of the Banque de France.

He died in the Gennevilliers château, near Paris, in 1841. He left his Memoirs, Opinions and Writings.

== Sources ==
- Larousse (undated French encyclopaedia, early 20th century)
- Heraldica.org- Napoleonic heraldry
