= François Barbé-Marbois =

French politician (1745–1837)

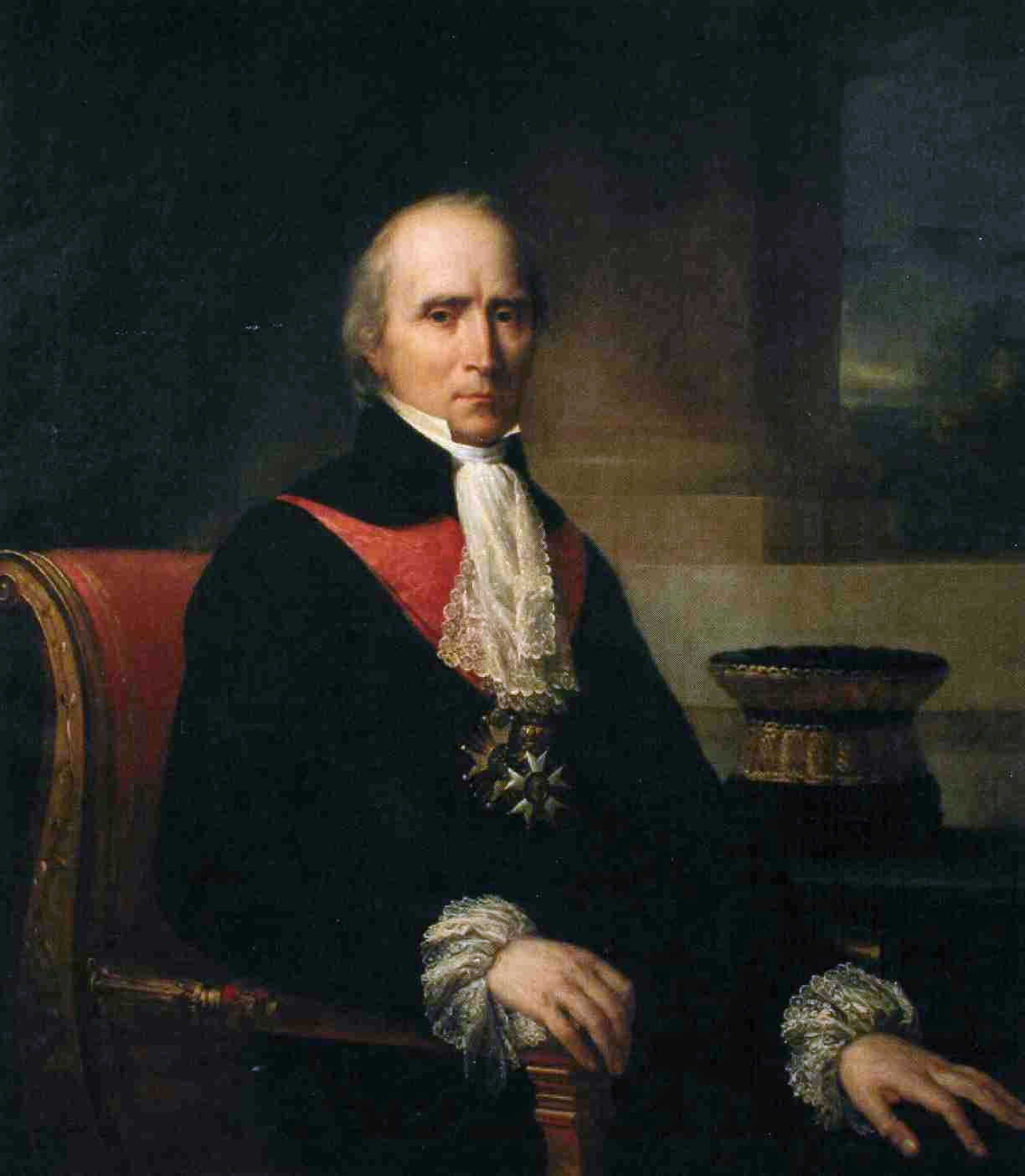

Ambassador of France to the United States
- In office 1784–1785

Minister of the Treasury
- In office 1801–1806

President of the Cour des Comptes
- In office 1807–1814

Personal details
- Born: 21 January 1745 Metz
- Died: 12 February 1837 (aged 92)

François, marquis de Barbé-Marbois (French pronunciation: [fʁɑ̃swa baʁbe maʁbwa]; 31 January 1745 – 12 February 1837) was a French civil servant, diplomat, and politician.

He was ambassador of France to the United States (1784–1785), where he married the daughter of the Governor of Pennsylvania, William Moore. He then became Napoleon's Minister of the Treasury (1801–1806), before Napoleon appointed him First President of the Cour des Comptes, ("Court of Accounts"), France's supreme audit institution (1807–1814).

== Early career ==
Born in Metz, where his father was director of the local mint, Barbé-Marbois tutored the children of the Marquis de Castries. In 1779, he was made secretary of the French legation to the United States. In 1780, Barbé-Marbois sent a questionnaire to the governors of all thirteen former American colonies, seeking information about each state's geography, natural resources, history, and government. Thomas Jefferson, who was then finishing his final term as Virginia's governor, responded to this query with a manuscript that later became his famous Notes on the State of Virginia.

Barbé-Marbois was elected a Foreign Honorary Member to both the American Academy of Arts and Sciences and the American Philosophical Society in 1781. When the minister Chevalier de la Luzerne returned to France in 1783, Barbé-Marbois remained in America as chargé d'affaires in 1784. That year he married Elizabeth Moore, the daughter of William Moore, former governor of Pennsylvania.

In 1785, he became intendant of the colony of Saint-Domingue under the Ancien Régime.

== In the Revolution ==
At the close of 1789, he returned to France, and then placed his services at the disposal of the French Revolutionary government. In 1791 he was sent to Regensburg to help the Marquis de Noailles, the French ambassador. Suspected of treason, he was arrested on his return but soon freed.

In 1795, he was elected to the Council of Ancients, where the general moderation of his attitude, especially in his opposition to the exclusion of nobles and the relations of émigrés from public life, brought him under suspicion of being a royalist, though he pronounced a eulogy on Napoleon Bonaparte for his success in Italy.

During the anti-Royalist coup d'état of the 18th Fructidor (4 September) 1797, he was arrested and transported to French Guiana. Transferred to the island of Oléron in 1799, he was set free by Bonaparte after the Coup of 18 Brumaire. In 1801, under the Consulate, he became councillor of state and director of the Trésor public (Treasury), and in 1802 a senator.

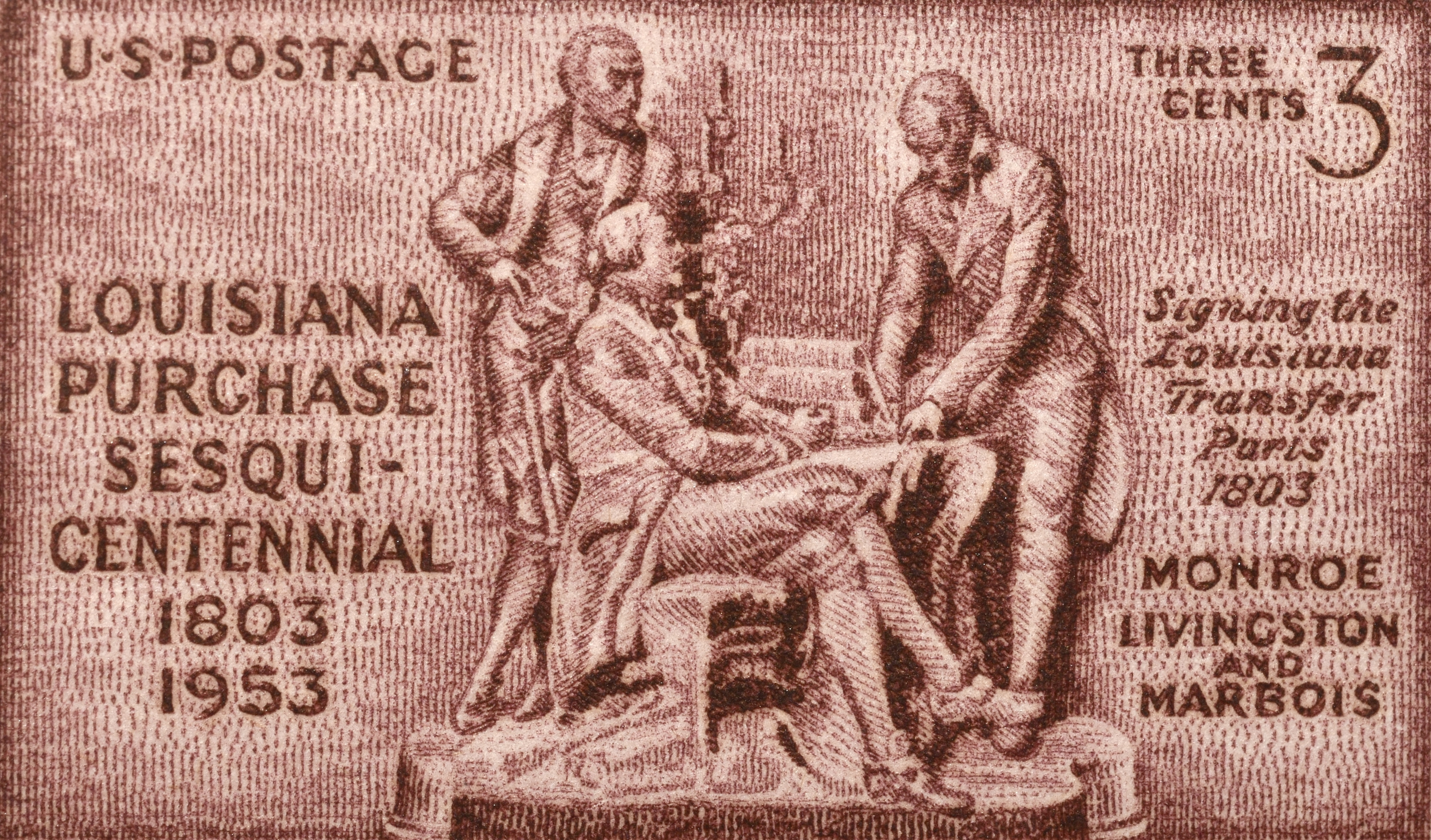
US postage stamp (c. 1953) commemorating the Louisiana Purchase; Barbé-Marbois is pictured alongside James Monroe and Robert Livingston

In 1803 he negotiated the Louisiana Purchase treaty by which Louisiana was ceded to the United States, and was rewarded by the First Consul with a gift of 152,000 francs.

== Empire, Restoration, and July Monarchy ==
Loyal to the First Empire, he was made grand officer of the Legion of Honour and a count in 1805, and in 1808 he became president of the Cour des Comptes. His career as Head of the Treasury ended in 1806. In return for these favours, he heaped praise upon Napoleon; yet, in 1814, he helped to draw up the act of abdication of the emperor, and declared to the Cour des Comptes, with reference to the invasion of France by the Sixth Coalition:

"...united for the most beautiful of causes, it is long since we have been as free as we are now, in the presence of the foreigner in arms."

In June of that year, under the First Restoration, Barbé-Marbois was made Peer of France by King Louis XVIII, and confirmed in his office as president of the Cour des Comptes. Deprived of his positions by Napoleon during the Hundred Days, he was appointed Minister of Justice under the Duc de Richelieu (August 1815), tried unsuccessfully to gain the confidence of the Ultra-Royalists, and withdrew at the end of nine months (10 May 1816).

In 1830, when the July Revolution brought Louis Philippe I and the Orléans Monarchy, Barbé-Marbois went, as president of the Cour des Comptes, to compliment the new king, and was confirmed in his position. He held his office until April 1834.

== Works ==
In 1829, he wrote the book Histoire de la Louisiane et la cession de cette colonie par la France aux Etats-Unis de l'Amérique septentrionale; précédée d'un discours sur la constitution et le gouvernement des Etats-Unis ("History of Louisiana and of Its Cession to the United States of Northern America; Preceded by a Discourse on the Constitution and Government of the United States").

He published various texts, including:

- Reflexions sur la colonie de Saint-Domingue ("Thought on the Colony of Saint-Domingue", 1794)
- De la Guyane, etc. ("On [French] Guiana", 1822)
- Journal d'un deporté non-jugé ("Diary of a Non-Tried Deportee", 2 vols., 1834)

Written in 1780, while secretary to the French legation to the US Army: "D'Complot du Benedict Arnold & Sir Henri Clinton contre Eunas` States du America General George Washington", one of the first accounts of Arnold's treason, was not published until 1816.

== See also ==
- Respublica v. De Longchamps - the "Marbois Affair"

== Works cited ==
- Tugdual de Langlais, L'armateur préféré de Beaumarchais, Jean Peltier Dudoyer, de Nantes à l'Isle de France, Éd. Coiffard, 2015, 340 p. (ISBN 9782919339280)
- Tugdual de Langlais, Marie-Etienne Peltier, Capitaine corsaire de la République, Éd. Coiffard, 2017, 240 p. (ISBN 9782919339471).
