= Pierre Vigier =

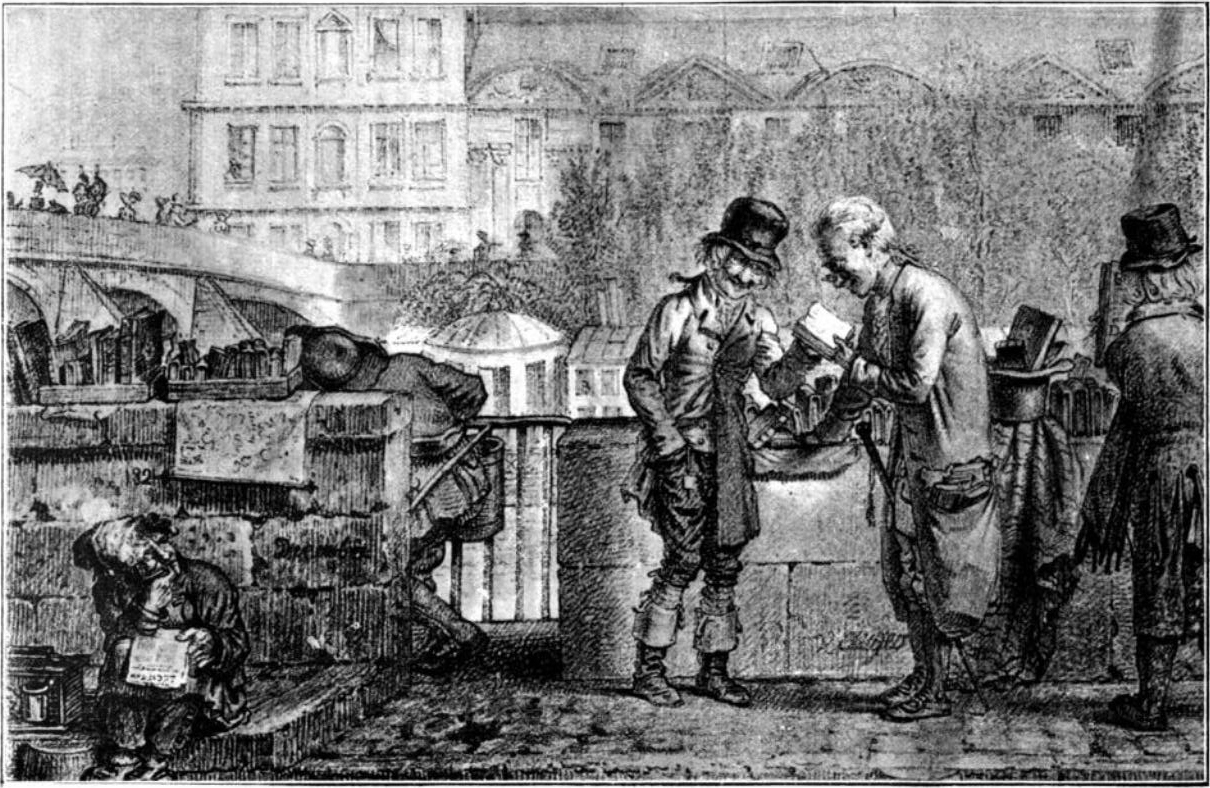
The Vigier Baths, across the Seine, seen from Quai Voltaire; engraving by Jean-Henry Marlet after Adrien Auger.

Pierre Vigier (1760 in Cassaniouze (Cantal) – 19 September 1817, in Savigny-sur-Orge) was a French magistrate.

== Life ==
Vigier is perhaps best known for managing several public baths on the banks of the Seine (the "Bains Vigier"). The first one opened in 1791.

Vigier was a public prosecutor at Parlement until the French Revolution, when he shifted to a successful career in the business of thermal baths (in French baigneur-étuviste).

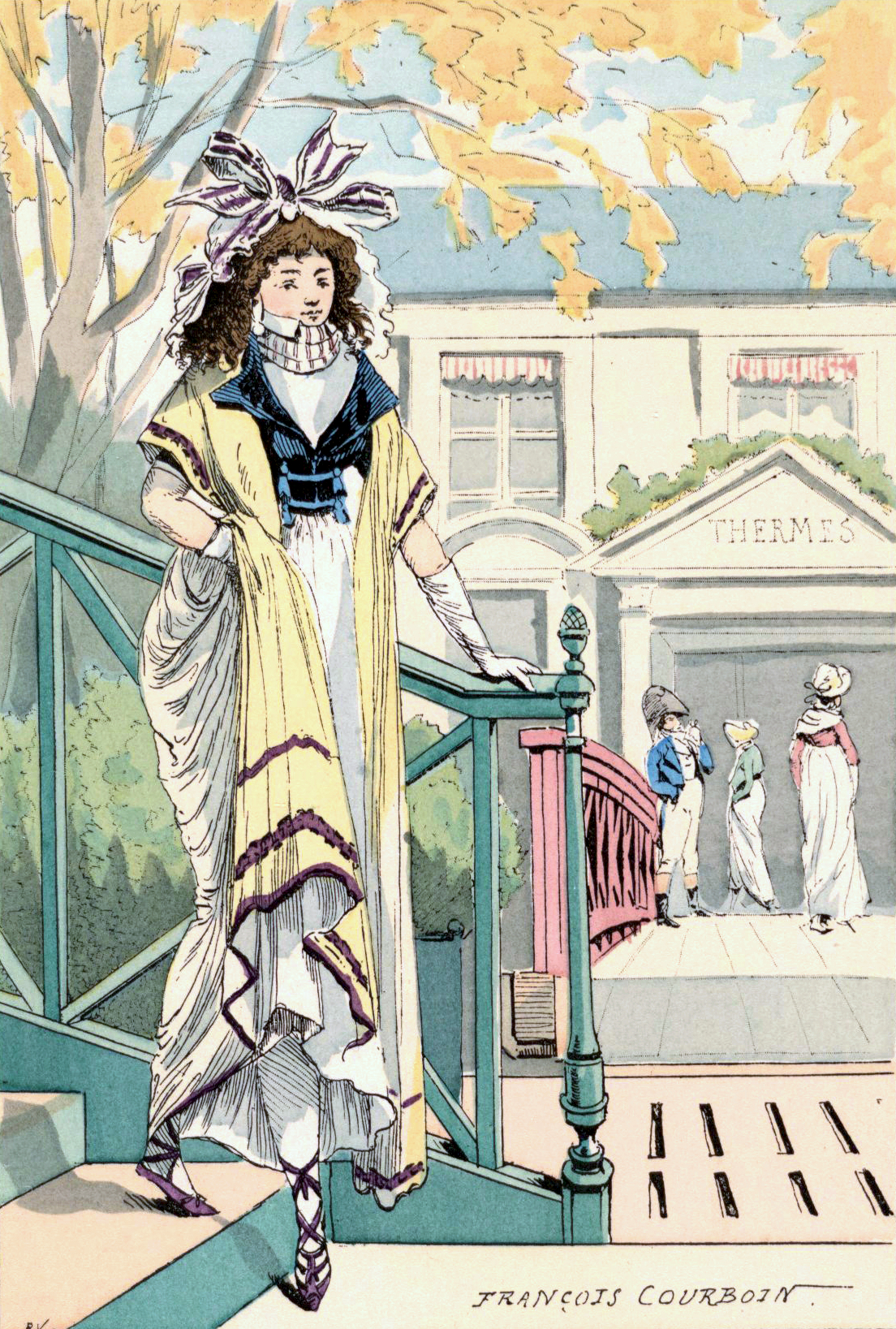
The Bains Vigier on an early nineteenth century color plate.
