= Chapelton, Jamaica =

Chapelton
- Market Town
- Location within Jamaica
- Coordinates: 18.082691°N 77.2669959°W
- Country: Jamaica
- Parish: Clarendon
- Elevation: 218 m (715 ft)

Population.
  - Estimate (2009): 4,559
- Time zone: UTC-5 (EST)

Chapelton is a market town in Clarendon Parish, Jamaica and the former parish capital.

== Name ==
According to a longtime resident:

Back in the days of plantation slavery in Jamaica, the Chapleton locality was a plantocracy settlement. Instead of going to church in the capital May Pen, the plantation owners built a church in Chapleton where they worshiped. Local folk therefore talked about going to “the chapel in the town.” After a while, the town became known as Chapel Town but with the passing of time, the name became distorted and was shortened to become Chapelton.

== Amenities ==
- Clarendon College, secondary school.
- Clarendon Hospital, built c1903, now a community Type 3 hospital.
- Police Station.
- St Paul's Anglican Church, founded over 300 years ago.

== Transport ==
=== Road ===
Chapelton is on the B3 road which climbs up from May Pen in the south, passes through the center of the town and continues north towards Brown's Town.

=== Rail ===
From 1925 to 1974 Chapelton was served by Chapelton railway station on the 21 mile railway branch line from May Pen to Frankfield.

== Notable people from Chapelton ==
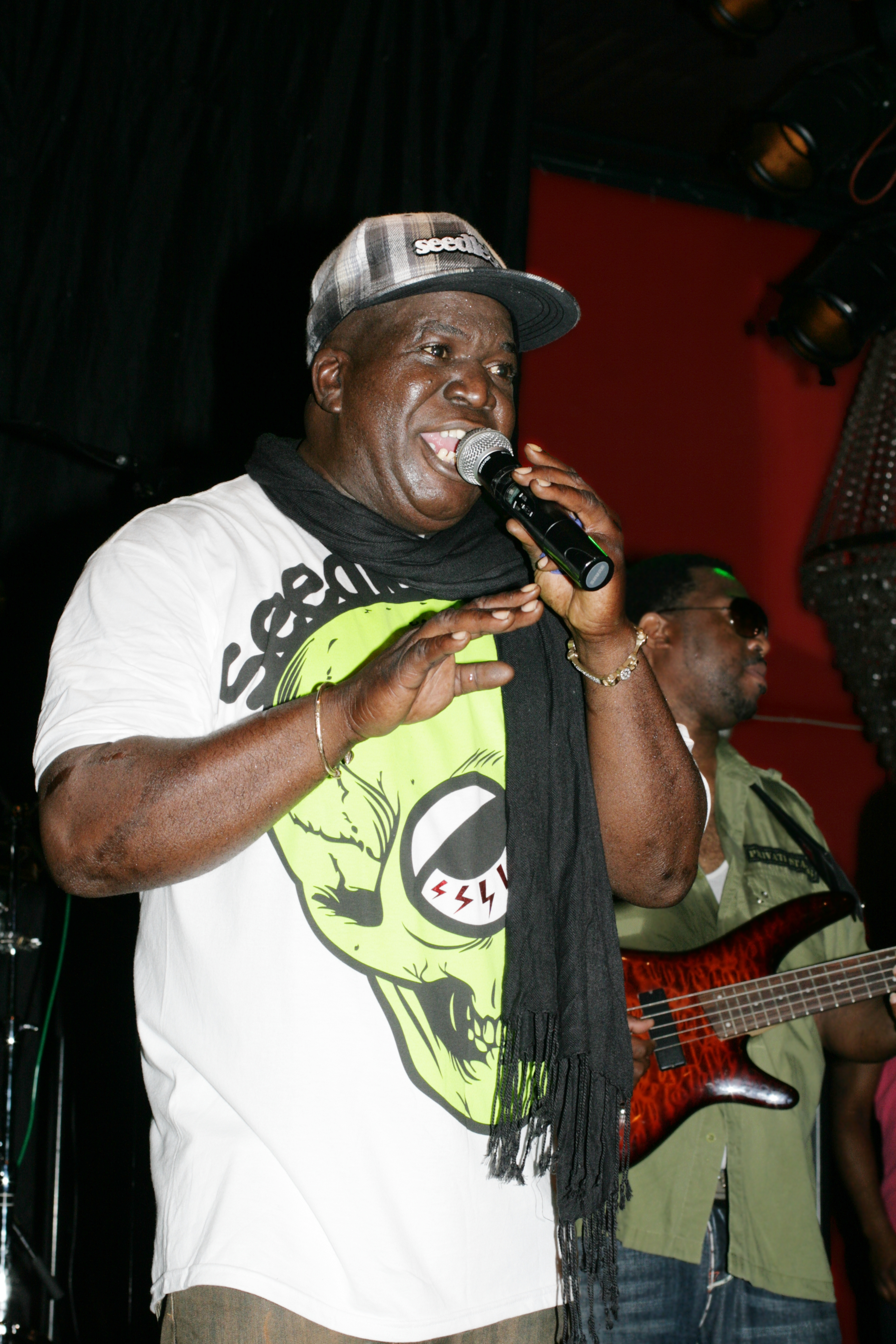
Barrington Levy

- Dennis Alcapone
- Everton Blender
- Toots Hibbert
- Linton Kwesi Johnson
- Barrington Levy
- Freddie McGregor
- Raphael Morgan (Robert Josias Morgan)
- Levi Roots
- Jah Shaka
- Cocoa Tea

== See also ==
- List of cities and towns in Jamaica
