= I-Octane =

Jamaican reggae and dancehall recording artist

I Octane
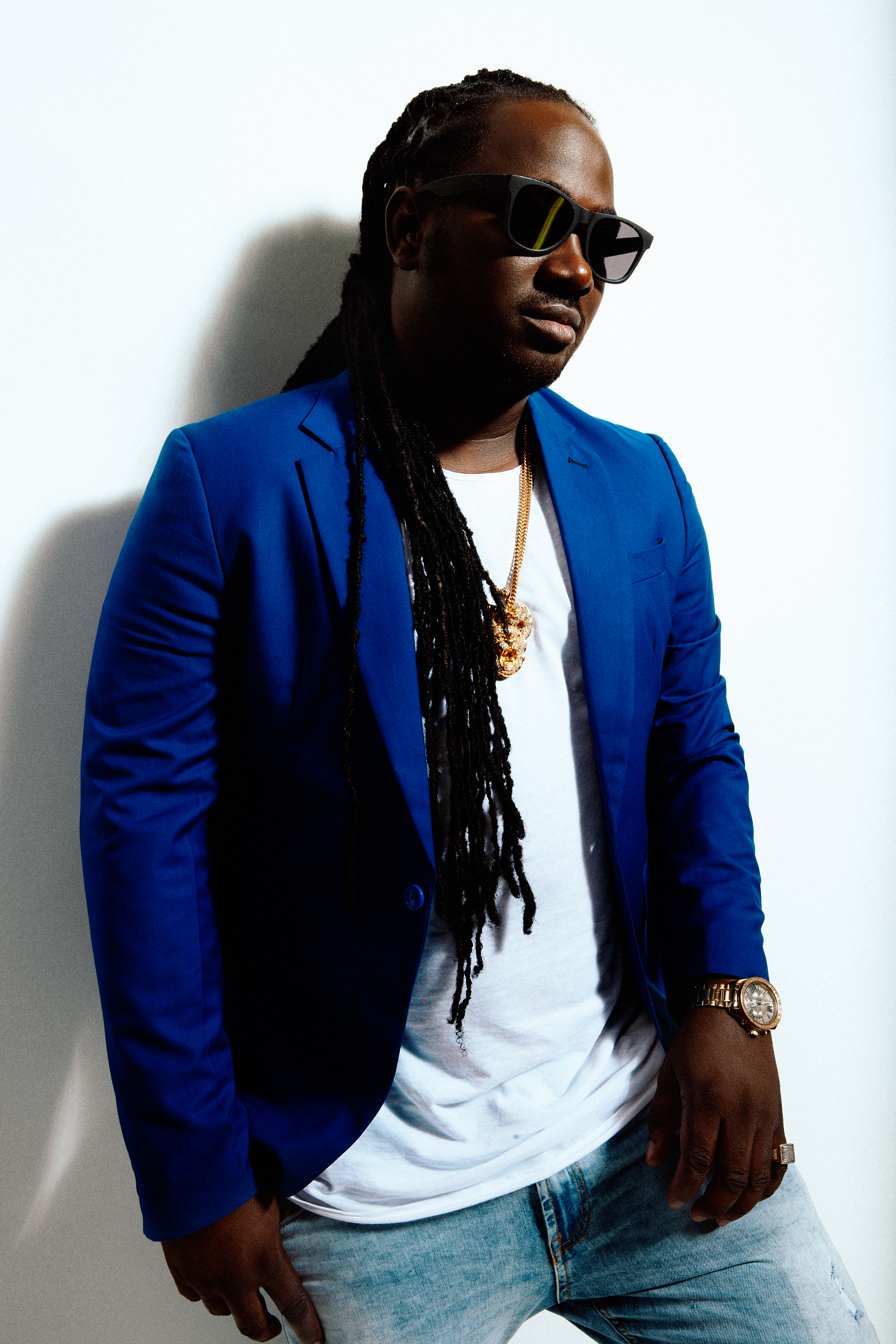
- Portrait photograph of I Octane
- Born: Byiome Muir; April 29, 1984 (age 41); May Pen Clarendon Parish, Jamaica
- Citizenship: Jamaican
- Education: Knox Community College
- Occupations: singer; songwriter
- Years active: 2000–present
- Musical career
- Genres: Dancehall; Reggae

Byiome Muir (born 29 April 1984), better known by his stage name I-Octane, is a Jamaican reggae dancehall recording artist from Clarendon Parish, Jamaica. He is known for integrating positive and socially conscious subject matter into his music, drawing inspiration from personal experiences and Rastafarian teachings.

== Biography ==
Byiome Muir grew up in Sandy Bay, a small community east of May Pen in Clarendon Parish, Jamaica. Muir attended Palmers Cross All-Age School and then Garvey Maceo High School, and would often sing and make noises during class. Muir briefly attended Knox Community College with a focus on architecture, but dropped out to pursue his recording career full-time.

Muir began his recording career at the age of 16, when he was introduced to Donovan Germain of Penthouse Records, then manager of such artists as Buju Banton and Assassin. Muir released his first singles, "Oh Jah" and "Stepp a Seed", in 2000 at Penthouse Records under the moniker Richie Rich. After meeting Junior Arrows of the Arrows Recording Company, Muir signed onto the Kingston label under the new name I-Octane, a play on high-octane fuel and the Rastafarian use of I. I-Octane's initial acclaim came in 2007 for his social commentary works such as the roots reggae track "Stab Vampire" which climbed to the top of several Jamaican charts. In 2009, I-Octane topped the charts again with his emotional songs "Mama You Alone" and "Lose A Friend", and the latter of which was later adapted as a tribute to those who died during the police manhunt for Christopher "Dudus" Coke in Tivoli Gardens.

When I-Octane left Arrows over financial disputes, the artist came under the guidance of Robert Livingston, a veteran producer who had been responsible for the success of such artists as Super Cat and Shaggy. I-Octane gained further traction in 2010 with a string of hits produced by Cashflow Records, including "No Love Inna Dem" and the cannabis anthem "Puff It," which was named as one of NPR's Top 5 Dancehall Tracks of 2011. He also topped the charts once again with the contemplative "My Life" produced by DJ Frass, and was featured in the April–May issue of the hip hop magazine Vibe. The same year, he also signed on as Brand Ambassador for the telecommunications firm Digicel, and as of 2013 he remains employed as a representative of the company. I-Octane has also been the Brand Ambassador for the Golden Eagle Brand in Jamaica since 2015.

In 2011, I-Octane announced he would be starting his own record label, Conquer The Globe Productions, which would serve to produce instrumentals for him and promote him as an artist. He also said the label's first release would be an extended play in December of that year to be followed by an album in early 2012. The six-song EP, "Straight From The Heart," was released on 7 December as a primarily digital release, with distribution by TuneCore. The EP was marketed towards a global audience and three of its songs were recorded in the U.S., a first for the artist. The EP's lead single "Burn Dem Bridge," produced by Stephen "Di Genius" McGregor, topped several charts in Jamaica and received significant radio airplay, including on international stations such as New York's Hot 97.

I-Octane's debut album, Crying To The Nation, was released on 13 February 2012 through Robert Livingston's Scikron Entertainment in the Caribbean and VP Records internationally. The album received generally positive reviews from critics. Rick Anderson of AllMusic praised the record as a "solid winner", but mentioned it relied a little too strongly on Auto-Tune, and David Katz of BBC Music called the album "a surprisingly varied set, comprising mostly new roots reggae in the one drop style, along with a couple of rougher-edged tracks in full-on dancehall mode". The album's lead single was the lovers rock ballad "L.O.V.E. Y.O.U.", which was marketed to international audiences but also did well domestically. I-Octane followed the album with a tour of the U.S., Canada, and Europe, and ended the year strong with a string of hit singles, including "Badmind Dem A Pree", a collaboration with Bounty Killer produced by Buju Banton's son Markus Myrie, the summer hit "Love Di Vibes", and the Seanizzle-produced "Gal A Gimmi Bun", a song in which I-Octane laments his partner's infidelity.

In March 2013, I-Octane was selected as brand ambassador for the Caribbean soft drink Busta, a product of S. M. Jaleel and Company.

His second album, the DJ Frass-produced My Journey, was released in March 2014 on Tad's International Records. He continued to work with DJ Frass on the 2015 EP New Chapter.

In March 2018, I-Octane's Love and Life album was released and debuted at #3 on the reggae Billboard where it stayed for 3 weeks. The Album was produced executively by I-Octane under his Conquer The Globe Production label, he worked with a new of producers and artistes.

In 2021 he released the album Moods, followed by I am Great (2022), which was preceded by the single "Sorry".

== Discography ==
=== Albums ===
- 2012: Crying To The Nation (VP/Scikron)
- 2014: My Journey (Tad's International)
- 2018: Love and Life (Conquer The Globe Productions)
- 2021: Moods
- 2022: I Am Great

=== Singles ===
- 2008: "Stab Vampire" (Arrows records) Tears Riddim
- 2009: "Lose A Friend"
- 2010: "Think A Likkle Time" (Alter Ego Riddim) / "My Life" (Dj Frass Records)
- 2011: "Burn Dem Bridge" (Di Genius Productions)
- 2012: "L.O.V.E." (VP Records)
- 2013: "Buss A Blank" (Produced by Armz House Records), Gal A Gimmi Bun (Produced by Seanizzle Records), Wine And Jiggle (Produced by Seanizzle Records), Happy Time (produced by Good Good Productions), Love You Like I Do (Produced by Dj Frass Records)
- 2014: "Your Eyes" (Produced by Markus Records), Cyaa Do It featuring Vanessa Bling (Produced by Dj Frass Records)
- 2015: "Hurt By Friends" (produced by Troyton Records), Gyal Ting (produce by Chimney Records)
- 2016: "No Shaky Link" (produced by Mineral Boss Records), Know Yuh Girl (Produced by LeeMiller Records)
- 2017: "One Chance" (produce by BigA), Break-thru (produced by Mineral Boss Records)
- 2018: "Unfair Games" (produced by Good Good Productions), Weh Di Fire gone (produced by Young Pow Records)
- 2019: "Plutocrat" (Produced by Aicon Records and Conquer The Globe Productions)
- 2022: "Sorry"

=== Extended plays ===
- 2011: My Life (Tad's Re/cord)
- 2011: Straight From The Heart (Conquer The Globe)
- 2015: New Chapter
- 2017: Vegas Mode Riddim (Conquer The Globe Productions)
