= Mineral spa =

Spa resorts near mineral springs

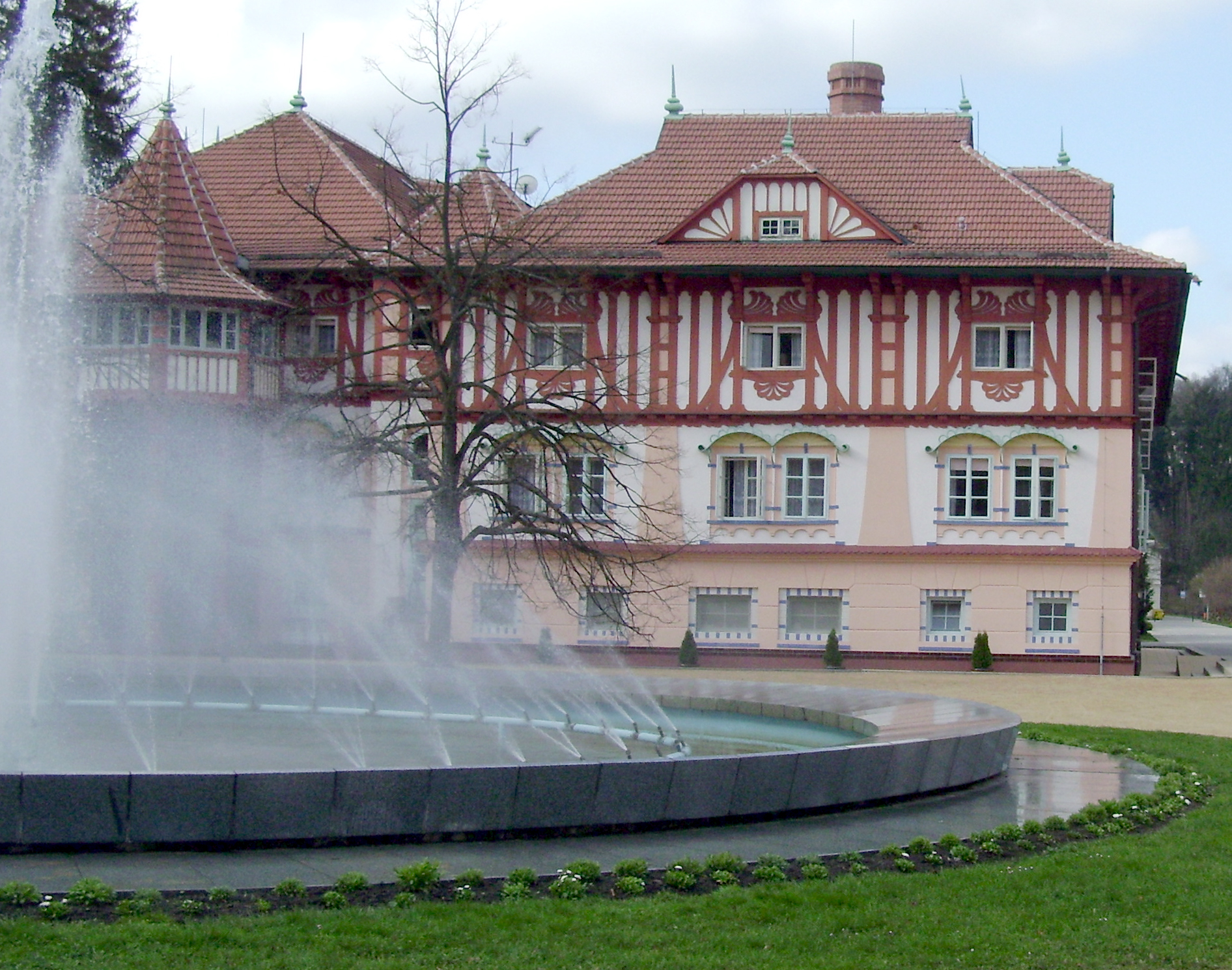
Spa Luhačovice in Czech Republic (hotel built by Dušan Jurkovič)

Mineral spas are spa resorts developed around naturally occurring mineral springs. Like seaside resorts, they are mainly used recreationally although they also figured prominently in prescientific medicine.

== Origins ==
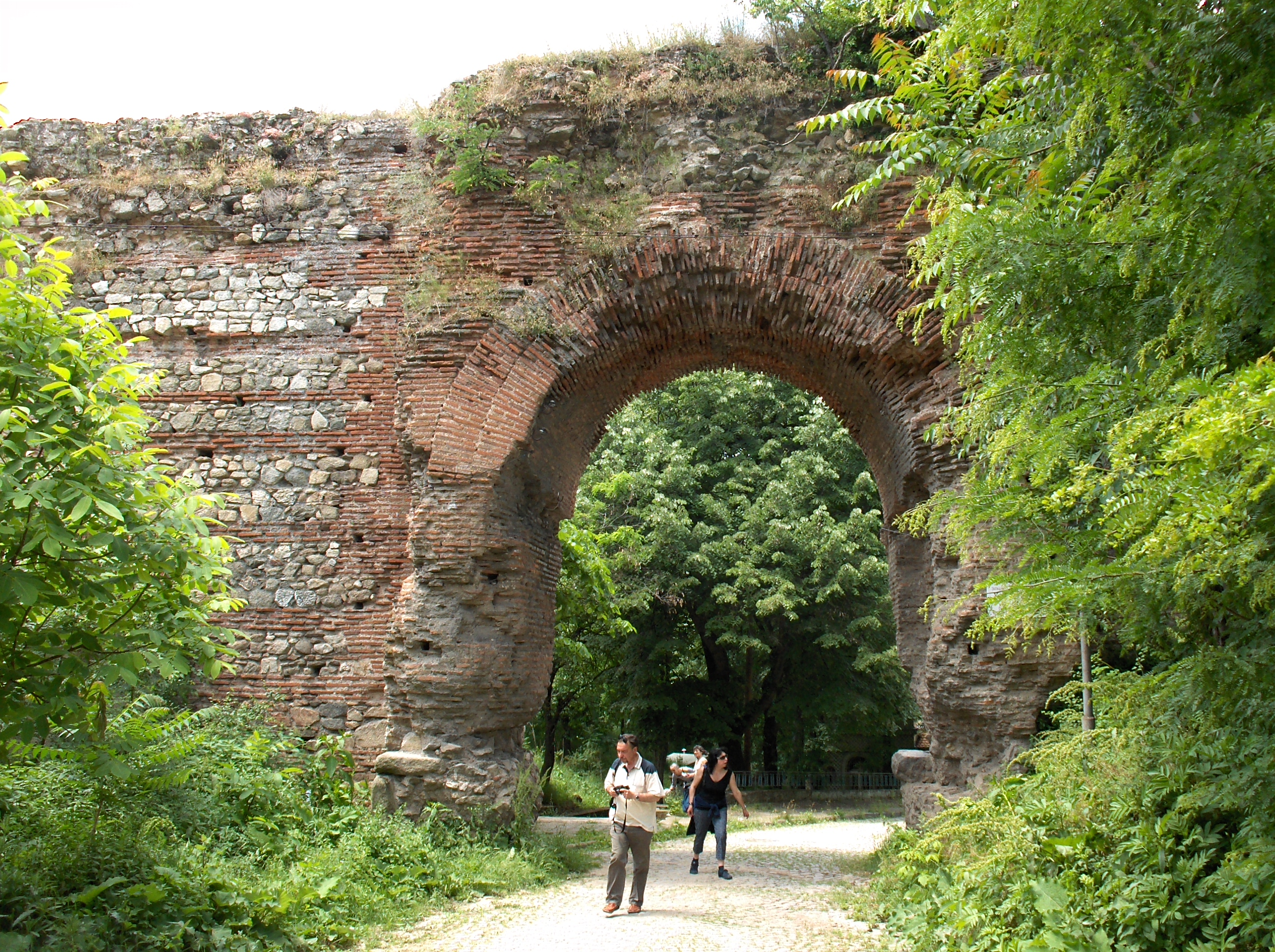
The walls of the Roman spa town Hisarya (Bulgaria)

Spas were used for millennia for their purported healing or healthful benefits to those wealthy or close enough to partake of their waters. This was called a mineral cure and gave let to phrases such as taking a cure and taking the waters. There has always been a mixture of recreational and medicinal connotations involved, from rest and relaxation, stress relief, and convalescence to more specific notions such as humorism. These phrases are sometimes used as a euphemism for one trying to kick a drug dependency.

In many cases, mineral spas were located in mountainous locales that gave an additional excuse to leave the drudgery of a hot house in warm weather during summer's onset and were seasonally populated by the well-to-do. They eventually became early vacation spots with the counter-Victorian work ethic 'rationale' of health as an excuse to have fun and mix with one's peers in recreation.

Subsequently, many became the seed stock for today's modern vacation resorts. Locations such as Steamboat Springs, Vail, St Moritz, Mineral Wells first became popular for the questionable health benefits of mineral or soda-water soaks, ingestion, and clean outs during the hey-day of patent medicines and backward medical knowledge. United States President Franklin Delano Roosevelt suffered a paralytic illness, and regularly visited Warm Springs and other hot springs for restorative soaks. While his cousin Theodore Roosevelt was known as a physically active and healthy person, he had asthma and used physical activity as well as occasional visits to mineral spas as attempts to address his asthma.

The name "spa" comes from the Belgian town Spa.

== Evolution of the resort ==
As the Victoria era ended, the influences of the industrial revolution created more and more varied members of the upper middle class. The concepts of vacationing, tourism, and travel became less the property of the old monied classes and more shared by an increasing population base of those who could afford holiday trips, like the rich.

Such adventures had much allure before any audio-visual entertainment outside a live orchestra. Thus, the spas began attracting more local patrons and those from afar when the burgeoning numbers could take advantage of the automobile and the now extensive railways throughout most of Europe and the United States.

The spa towns already had infrastructure and attractions to assuage such desires, and the modern tourist trip began to take its familiar form. Other technologies came into play (skis, ski boats, etc.)

== Notable mineral spa and spring areas ==
=== Africa ===
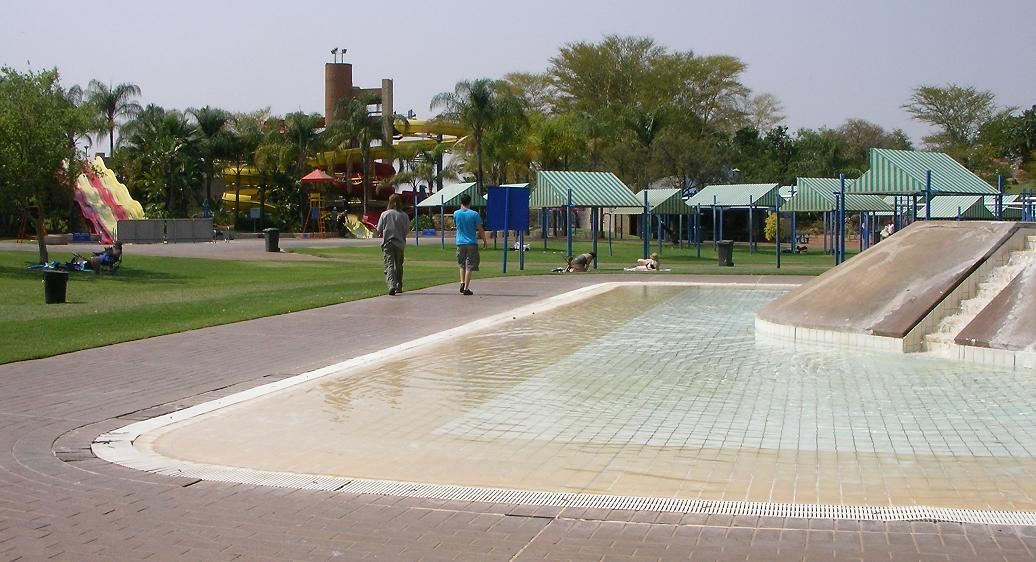
Slides and pools in the hot springs camp in Bela-Bela (South Africa)

==== South Africa ====
- Caledon, Western Cape
- Tshipise, Limpopo
- Bela Bela, Limpopo
- Badplaas, Mpumalanga

=== Asia ===
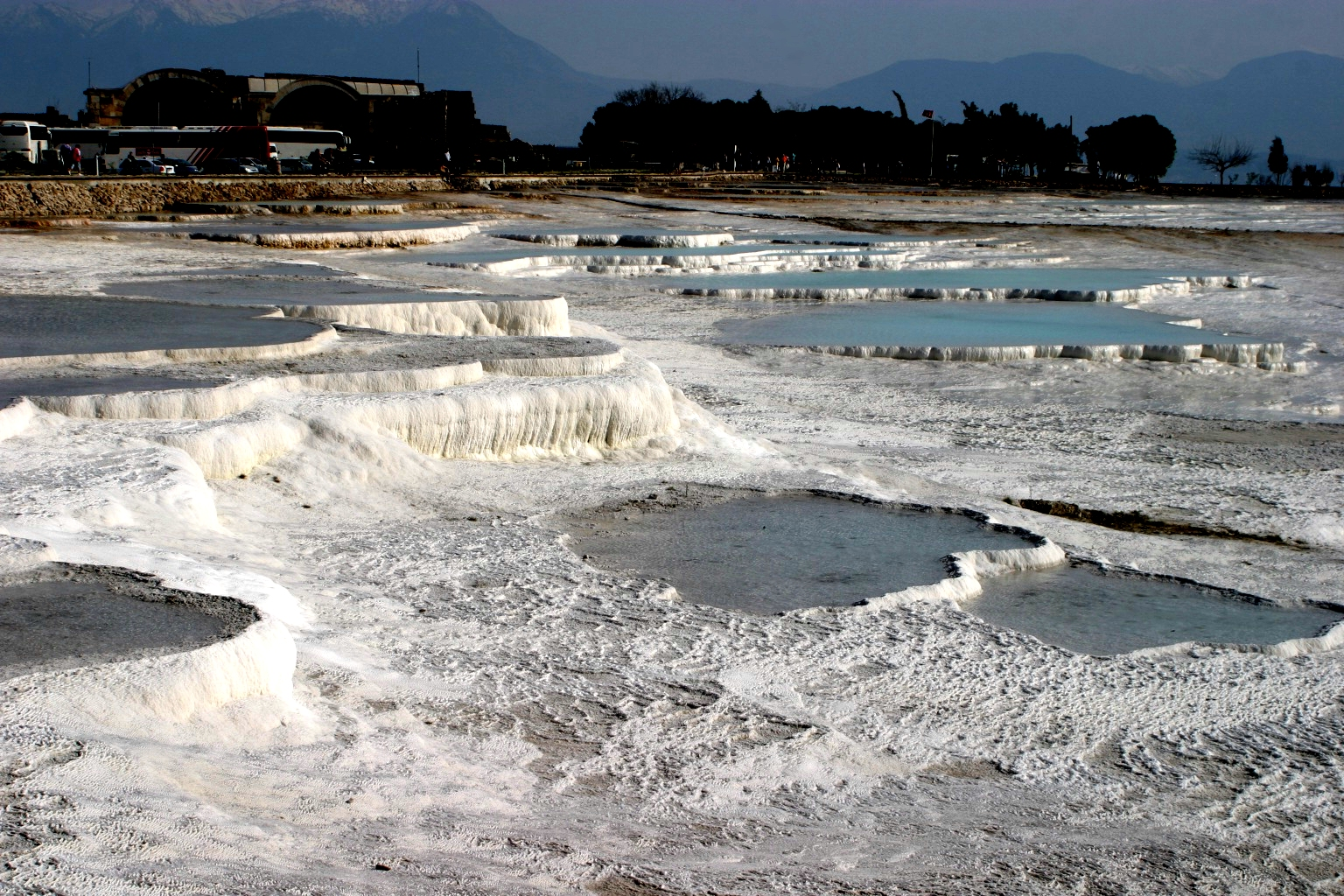
Hot springs of Pamukkale (Turkey)

==== China ====
- Anshan, Liaoning

==== India ====
Vajreshwari Temple, Maharashtra

==== Japan ====
- Beppu, Ōita
- Gero, Gifu

==== South Korea ====
- Yuseong-gu, Daejeon

==== Turkey ====
- Pamukkale, Denizli Province

=== Europe ===
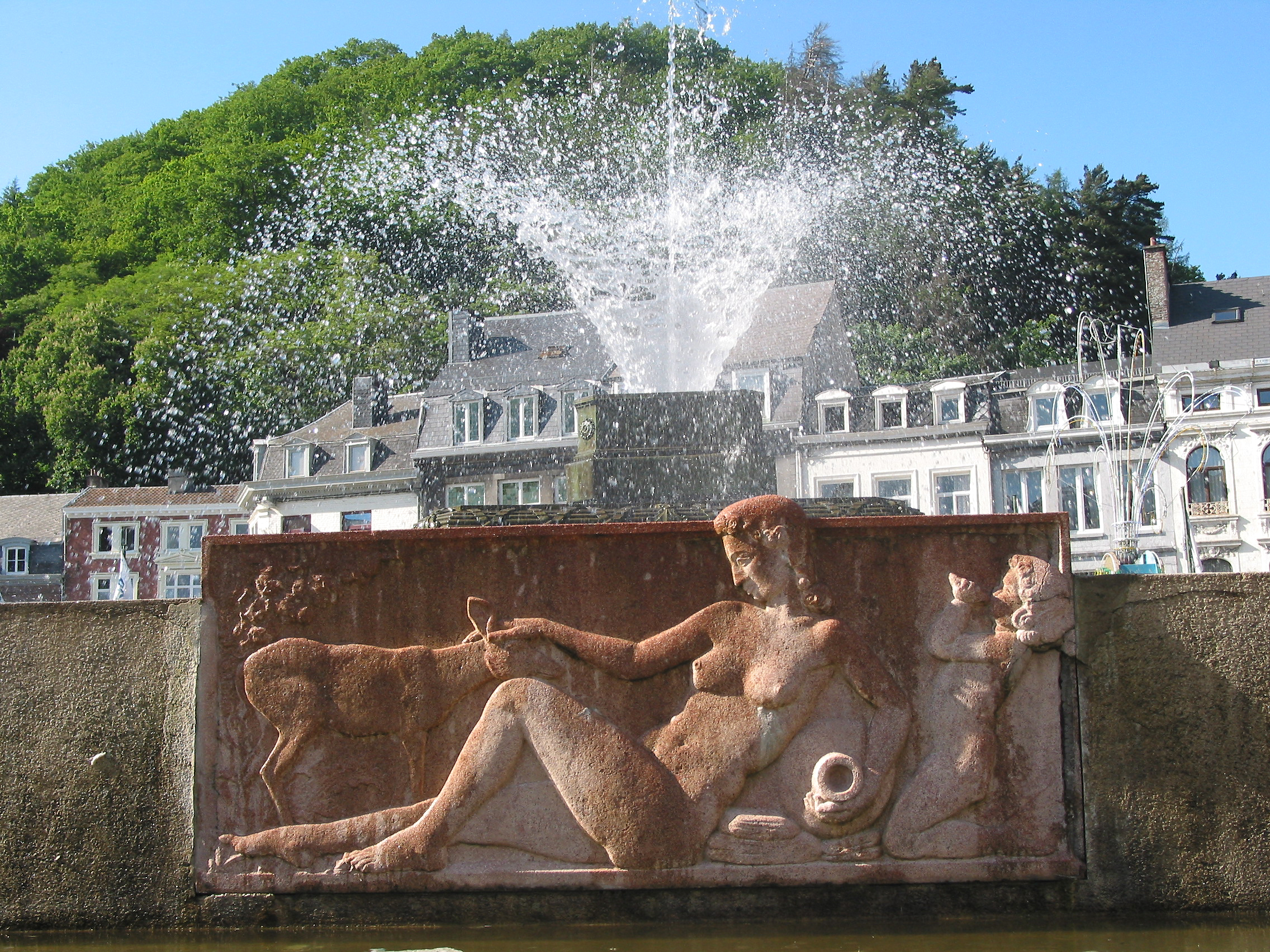
Spa (in Belgium), the water city

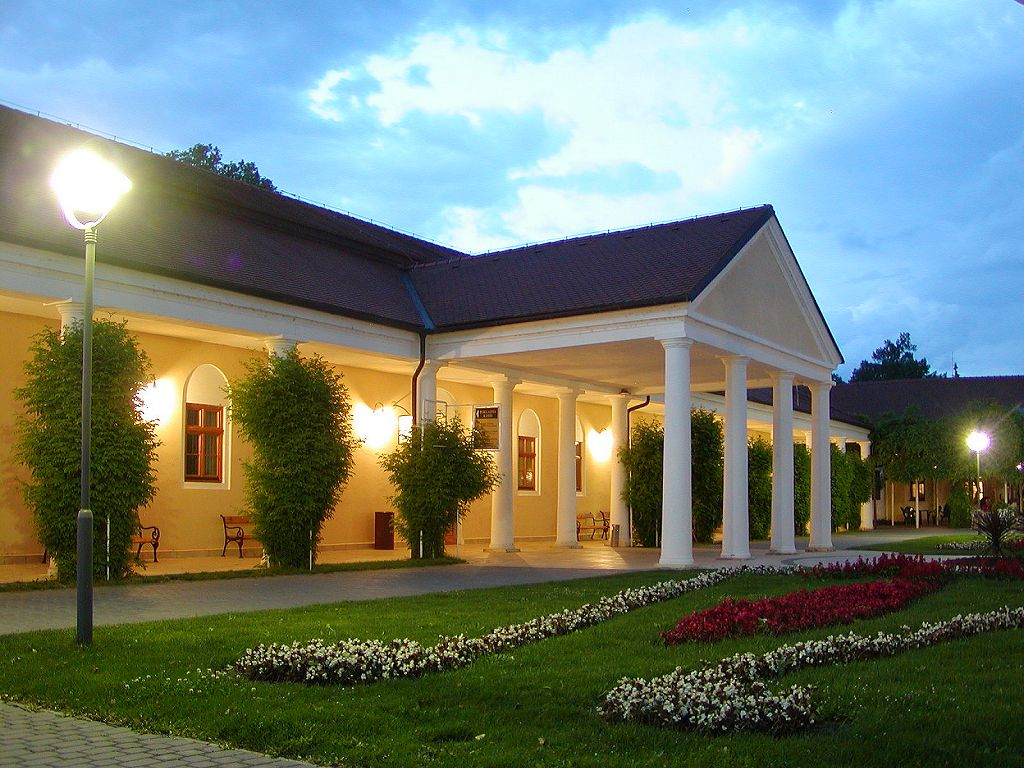
The Napoleon Spa in Piešťany (Slovakia)

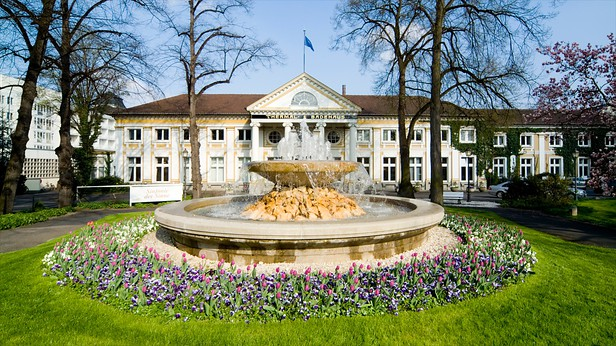
Thermal Badehaus und Kurhaus in Bad Neuenahr (Germany)

==== Albania ====
- Spa, Peshkopi

==== Armenia ====
- Arzni
- Bjni
- Hankavan
- Jermuk

==== Austria ====
- Bad Fischau-Brunn

==== Azerbaijan ====
- İstisu, Kalbajar

==== Belgium ====
- Spa (municipality)

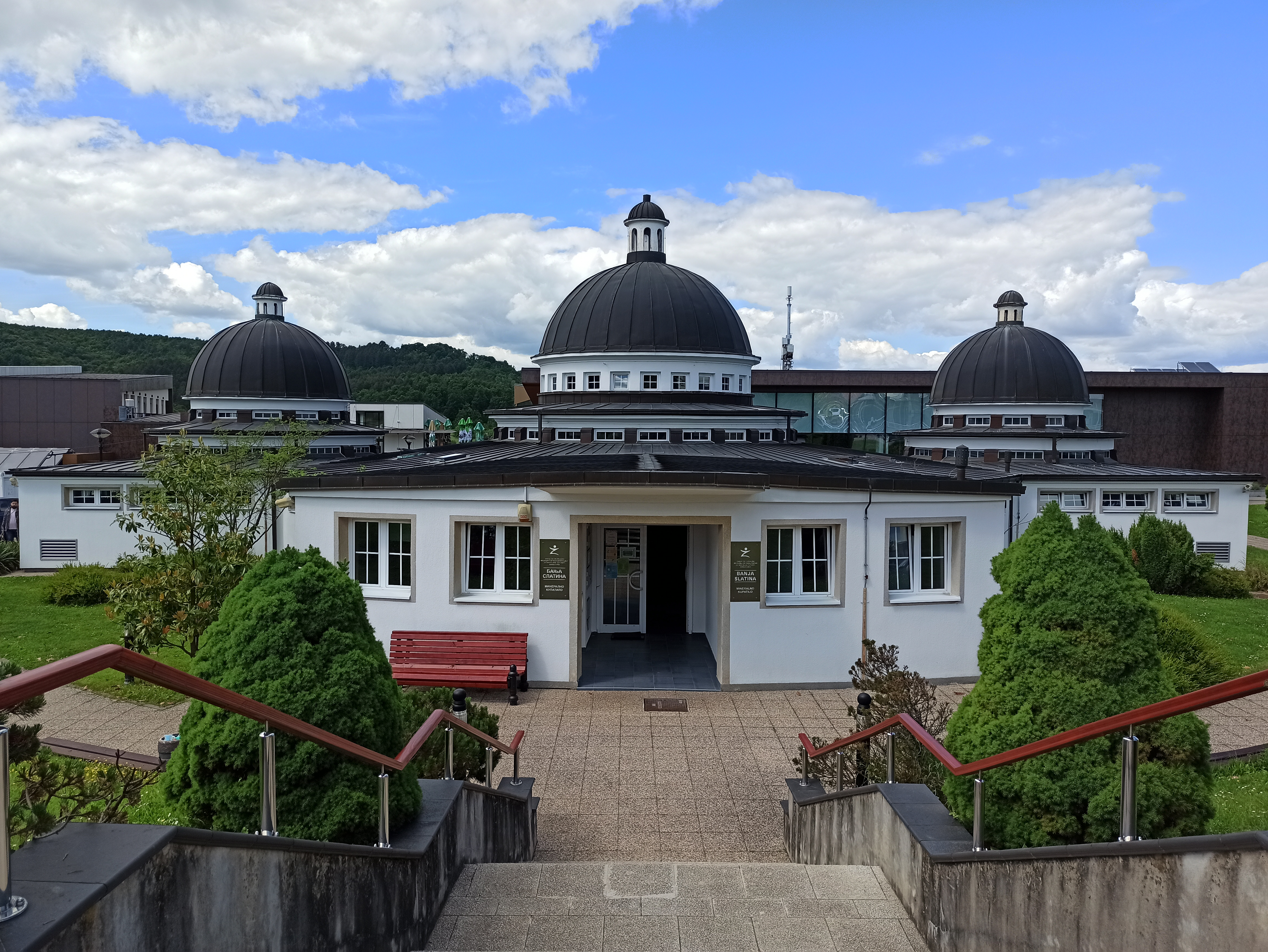
The Slatina Spa in Slatina, Republic of Srpska, BiH

==== Bosnia and Herzegovina ====
- Slatina

==== Bulgaria ====
- Bankya
- Banya, Plovdiv Province
- Dobrinishte
- Hisarya
- Kyustendil
- Narechen
- Pavel Banya
- Sandanski
- Sapareva Banya
- Varshets
- Velingrad

==== Czech Republic ====
- Karlovy Vary
- Luhačovice
- Mariánské Lázně

==== France ====
- Aix-les-Bains
- Dax
- Évian-les-Bains
- Tercis-les-Bains
- Vichy

==== Georgia ====
- Borjomi

==== Germany ====
- Baden-Baden
- Bad Neuenahr
- Wiesbaden

==== Hungary ====
- Budapest
- Hévíz

==== Poland ====
- Ciechocinek
- Krynica-Zdrój
- Nałęczów

==== Romania ====
- Baile Felix
- Baile Govora
- Baile Herculane
- Baile Tusnad
- Vatra Dornei

==== Russia ====
- Belokurikha, Altai
- Nalchik, Kabardino-Balkarian Republic
- Svetlogorsk, Kaliningrad Oblast
- Martsialnye Vody, Karelia
- Goryachy Klyuch, Krasnodar Krai
- Yeysk, Krasnodar Krai
- Staraya Russa, Novgorod Oblast
- Kislovodsk, Stavropol Krai
- Pyatigorsk, Stavropol Krai
- Yessentuki, Stavropol Krai
- Zheleznovodsk, Stavropol Krai

==== Serbia ====
- Bukovička Banja
- Vrnjačka Banja

==== Slovakia ====
- Korytnica kúpele
- Piešťany
- Trenčianske Teplice
- Turčianske Teplice

==== Slovenia ====
- Radenci

==== Spain ====
- A Toxa
- Caldes de Malavella
- Lanjarón
- Panticosa
- Zestoa

==== Sweden ====
- Ramlösa hälsobrunn

==== Switzerland ====
- Saint-Moritz

==== United Kingdom ====
===== England =====
- Askern
- Bath
- Boston Spa
- Buxton
- Cheltenham
- Church Stretton
- Dorton Spa
- Droitwich Spa
- Epsom
- Harrogate
- Ilkley
- Knaresborough
- Malvern
- Matlock
- Matlock Bath
- Royal Leamington Spa
- Royal Tunbridge Wells
- Scarborough; see also The Spa, Scarborough
- Shap
- Shearsby
- Tenbury Wells
- Woodhall Spa

==== Ukraine ====
- Yalta

=== Americas ===
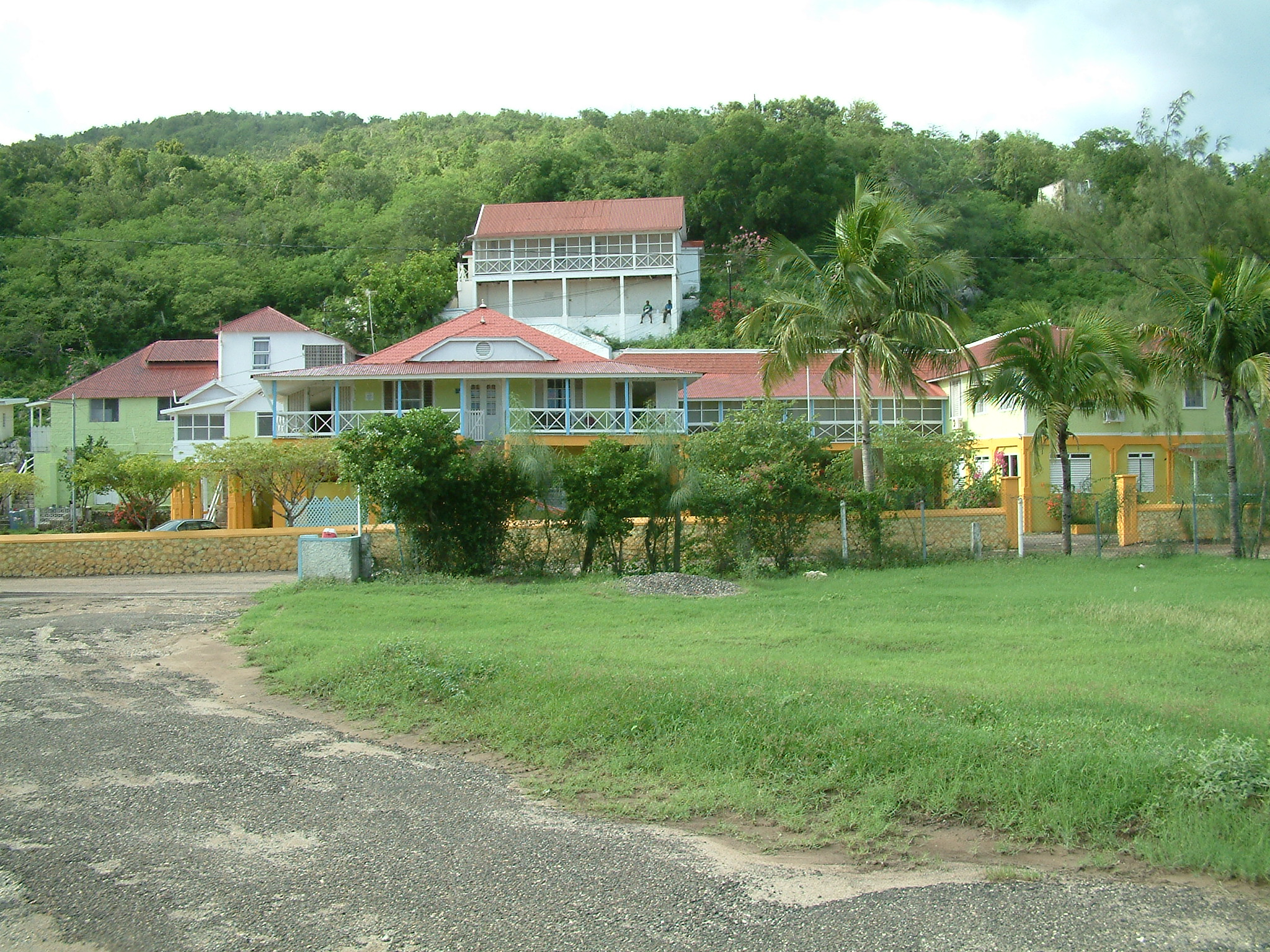
Milk River Bath (Jamaica)

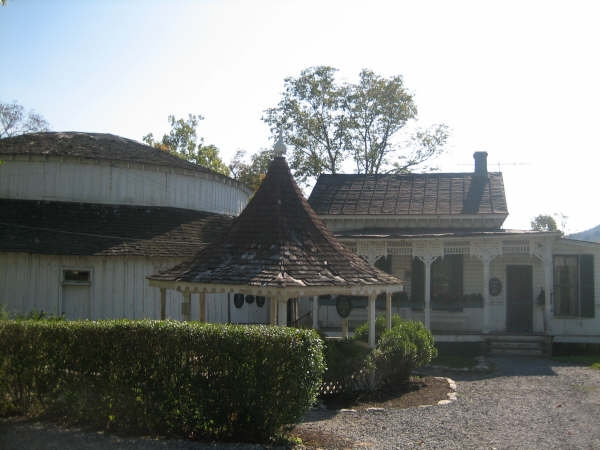
Warm Springs, Virginia (U.S.)

==== Brazil ====
- Caxambu

==== Canada ====
- Harrison Hot Springs

==== Costa Rica ====
- Tabacón

==== Jamaica ====
- Milk River Bath, Clarendon

==== Mexico ====
- Agua Hedionda

==== Uruguay ====
- Termas del Arapey

==== United States ====
- Desert Hot Springs, California
- French Lick, Indiana
- Eureka Springs, Arkansas
- Hot Lake, Oregon
- Hot Springs, Arkansas
- Mineral Wells, Texas
- Mount Clemens, Michigan
- Poland Spring, Maine
- Saratoga Springs, New York
- Sharon Springs, New York
- Steamboat Springs, Colorado
- Warm Springs, Georgia
- Warm Springs, Virginia
- Berkeley Springs, West Virginia
- Waukesha, Wisconsin

=== Oceania and Australia ===
==== Australia ====
- Hepburn Springs
- Daylesford
- Peninsula Hot Springs, Victoria

==== New Zealand ====
- Hanmer Springs
- Rotorua
