= Frankfield railway station =

Frankfield

General information
- Coordinates: 18.1467°N 77.3668°W
- Owner: Jamaica Railway Corporation
- Line: May Pen to Frankfield branch line

History
- Opened: 1925
- Closed: 1974; since demolished
Location
- Location within Jamaica

Frankfield railway station was the terminus of a 21-mile railway branch line from May Pen serving the eponymous market town, 55.25 miles (88.92 km) from the Kingston terminus. It opened in 1925 with the completion of the final 9¼ mile extension on the branch, and closed in 1974 when the branch itself closed due to a lack of maintenance. It has since been demolished.

== See also ==
- Railway stations in Jamaica

== Bibliography ==
- Satchell, Veront M & Sampson, Cezley (2003). "The rise and fall of railways in Jamaica 1845-1975". The Journal of Transport History. 24 (1): 1–21. doi:10.7227/TJTH.24.1.2. S2CID 154691362. Archived from the original on 2007-12-08.
