= Frankfield =

- Town
- Location within Jamaica
- Coordinates: 18.1463208°N 77.3658246°W
- Country: Jamaica
- Parish: Clarendon
- Elevation: 276 m (906 ft)

Population.
  - Estimate (2009): 3,323

Frankfield is a town in the parish of Clarendon in central Jamaica. It is located near the top of Jamaica's central ridge of mountains overlooking the south coast. The Rio Minho river runs through the town in a shallow gorge.

== Transport ==
=== Road ===
Frankfield is on the B4 road which climbs up from Trout Hall in the south, crosses into the town from the south east via a bridge over the Rio Minho, passes through the town's central square and continues north towards Grantham and Spaldings. From the town centre going towards the south west a lesser road connects Frankfield with Nine Turns, Smithville, Wakefield, Thompson Town, Mocho, Four Paths and May Pen.

=== Rail ===
From 1925 to 1974 Frankfield railway station was the terminus of a 21-mile railway branch line from May Pen.

== See also ==
- List of cities and towns in Jamaica
