= Willie Francis (singer) =

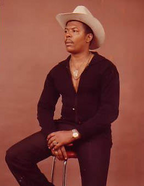

Willie Francis (born Wilbert Winston Francis on 18 March 1943 in Farm District in South Manchester, Jamaica) is a ska/reggae singer who came to prominence in the late 1960s and throughout the 1970s. He is known for hits such as "Oh What a Mini'", a top ten hit in the Jamaican charts. His other notable songs include "Ripe Sour Sop" and "I'm Going to Change Everything".

Willie Francis was also a producer and is responsible for recording famous reggae singer Cocoa Tea's first song "Searching the Hills" in 1974. Willie Francis' song "Motherless Children" is featured on Disc 2 of the "Trojan Skinhead Reggae Box Set CD".

Willie Francis worked in England in the late 1970s, and lived in Canada for a number of years before returning to Jamaica.

Willie Francis' former wife Victoria Francis, mother of his two children, Lavern and Novene Francis, later divorced him.

He then fathered six more children, Junior, Janielle, Fabian, Natalie, Ishmael and Maria.
