= May Pen High School =

Location
- 18A Bryants Crescent; May Pen, Clarendon; 17.9703138°N 77.2401967°W

Information
- Motto: Christ is the Source of All Knowledge
- Religious affiliation: Christian
- Denomination: Adventist
- Founded: 1954
- Principal: Winston E. Preddie
- Enrollment: 400+
- Hours in school day: 8 hrs 30 mins
- Houses: Jupiter, Mercury, Venus and Mars
- Colours: Green and Yellow

May Pen High School (abbreviated M.P.H.S. or MPHS) is a privately – run Seventh-Day Adventist School in Jamaica with an estimated population of 400 students. The school is located at 18A Bryants Crescent, May Pen, Clarendon and has been there for over 30 years. It is a part of the Seventh-day Adventist education system, the world's second largest Christian school system.

== History ==
It is the philosophy of the Seventh-day Adventist Church that church schools should be established in many areas to educate the children of its members. It was this dream that drove Mrs. Lucille Christian-Bennett, the late Ms. Amy Stevenson and Mr. McIntyre and a few others to give birth to the May Pen Seventh Day Adventist church school in January 1954.

The school's first classrooms were in the church building which was situated at the corner of Manchester Avenue and Church Street in May Pen. The records showed that on the first day of school, there was only one student who met with Mrs. H. Butler who was the principal. The growth was steady, if not rapid, and so in 1958 they had to add the high school section to take care of the students who had completed the elementary division. It was now called May Pen Academy to reflect its new status. Manchester Avenue became too busy and noisy for Sabbath services, and so property was purchased in the quiet "bushes" at 18a Bryants Crescent to relocate the church and the school came along to share the facilities.

Co-existence became difficult for both institutions at this location so the new church building was constructed on Fernleigh Avenue and the school was left to continue its expansion at its present home. Nineteen sixty-three saw the school moving to a higher level of delivery with a larger student body. It was at this time that it had its second name change as May Pen High School came into being. The school went through major changes in the early nineteen eighties. The management was taken over by a group of Seventh Day Adventist members who believed in the education system of the church and the future of the institution. Many other changes took place in the operational structure, financing and an enlightened approach to education.

== Principals ==
The years following have been marked with new levels of development in every aspect of the school – building, grounds, student behaviour, examinations, equipment, quality of teachers, methods of teaching etc.

- H. Butler
- K. G. Vaz
- J. C. Palmer
- Merle Bennett
- Annifred E. Shaw
- Donald McIntyre
- Peter Campbell
- Winston E. Preddie – Current Principal
- Sonia I. Preddie – Current Vice Principal

== Houses ==
There are currently seven houses for both high school and preparatory: High school:

- Jupiter
- Venus
- Mars
- Mercury

Preparatory:

- Falcon
- Canary
- Eagle

== See also ==
- List of Seventh-day Adventist secondary and elementary schools
- List of Seventh-day Adventist colleges and universities
- List of Seventh-day Adventist medical schools
- List of Seventh-day Adventist secondary schools
- Seventh-day Adventist education
- List of schools in Jamaica
