= GSB Co-operative Credit Union =

- Type: Credit union
- Founded: 1944
- Headquarters: Jamaica

GSB Co-operative Credit Union (previously known as GSB Clerks Co-operative Credit Union), one of the top ten credit unions in Jamaica, was founded in 1944 and registered in 1946. It is open to two groups: public-sector employees (and their families) and members of registered professional groups (and their families).

Peter John O’Sullivan, a Jesuit priest who founded the Jamaica Co-operative Credit Union League and a number of credit unions) was instrumental in its development under its first president (D.V. Jerry Smith) and treasurer (S. Kellog Wilson). Wilson served briefly, and was succeeded in 1947 by Austin E. McClaren. Membership was first restricted to GSB clerks, excluding managers and executives of the bank and leading to a low influx of capital and a high demand for loans. Despite this, in 1950 GSB Clerks was the first credit union to accumulate £1,000 in deposits. In March 1948 its members amended the rules to include all civil servants, spouses, children and the staffs of statutory boards and public corporations. In 1997, as part of amendments to its bond its name was changed to its present name.

== Bond ==
The credit union's bond of association has widened to include members' brothers, sisters, nieces, nephews, aunts, uncles and parents. In 1950 GSB was the first credit union in Jamaica (and the Caribbean) to contract with the CUNA Mutual Insurance Society to protect members' savings and loans, standard for all credit unions. In 1954 it rented offices at the Teachers Mutual Aid Society Building at 28 Duke Street, hiring Horace Abrahams as the first general manager of a Jamaican credit union. During the late 1960s the office moved to the residence of Walter Brown (canon of All Saints Anglican Church) at 10 East Avenue, Kingston Gardens. Brown's residence was rebuilt as the head office in 1974; in 1986 it was renamed in memory of the credit union's first president, D. V. (Jerry) Smith.

== Expansions ==
GSB acquired the portfolio of neighbouring Metropolis Cooperative Credit Union (formerly Lands Clerks Co-operative Credit Union Society, with a membership of 1,862) in December 1999, and acquired the assets of the Kingston and St. Andrew Credit Unions (with about 500 members) in June 2003. In June 2001 GSB opened its first branch office at 20 Dominica Drive, New Kingston. In 2010, the membership agreed to expand its bond to members of professional associations. GSB has three branches: at Kingston Gardens, New Kingston and May Pen, Clarendon.

== Leadership ==
GSB's president is Michael Roofe, and the CEO is Courtney Lodge. They are supported by a board of six members and a management team of seven. Roofe has been president since 2008, and Lodge has been CEO since 2010.

== Member ownership ==
Like all credit unions, GSB is owned by its members and run by a president and board (elected annually at a general meeting). The volunteer board implements the mandate of the members.
