= May Pen to Frankfield railway =

Railway in Clarendon Parish, Jamaica

The May Pen to Frankfield railway was a railway in Jamaica built to serve the fast developing citrus industry in the upper Clarendon regions of Chapelton and Frankfield.

== Inception ==
During the 1911 general election railway extension was a prominent issue, and in March the Colonial Secretary introduced into the Legislature a resolution authorising the expenditure of £90,000 on the construction of a branch line from May Pen to Danks, beyond Chapelton in upper Clarendon. "After an animated discussion the resolution was carried by 19 votes to 5. The new line will open up the fertile valley of the Rio Minho... It is hoped that ultimately the line will be driven forward to the still more fertile district of Ulster Spring in Upper Trelawny and then on to Falmouth, the seaport on the north side of the island, whose former prosperity would thereby be restored." Due to the Great War and the economic situation in the Twenties this long-term aim was never accomplished.

== Construction, operation and closure ==
The 13 miles (21 km) of standard gauge track from May Pen to Chapelton were laid between 1911 and 1913 at a cost of £86,000.

The 9¼ mile extension to Frankfield was added in 1925. It required the bridging of twelve rivers, which must have been a significant contribution to the twelve year construction hiatus.

The line closed in 1974.

== Gradients ==
The line climbed 650 feet in 18½ miles (average gradient 1 in 150) from May Pen (239 feet) to its summit at Crooked River (889 feet) then continued for 3¾ miles more or less on the level to Frankfield (908 feet).

== Stations and Halts ==
There were 10 stations and halts on the line c1973. More recent references mention only nine:

- May Pen Station
- Longville Halt
- Suttons Station
- Cross Roads/Ivy Store Station
- Chapelton Station
- Danks Station, closed c1921.
- Morgans Station
- Bryan's Hill Station, extant 1973; unmentioned 2005.
- Crooked River Station
- Trout Hall Station
- Frankfield Station (Terminus)

== Bridges ==
There were 13 significant bridges on the line, all but the first being on the Chapelton to Frankfield extension. Approximate bridge lengths are shown in the route diagram (right):

- Track leading to Sevens sugar estate
- Thomas River
- Rio Minho
- Orange River
- Stony River
- Orange River
- Ballards River
- Crooked River
- Crooked River
- Dawkins River & track
- Rio Minho & B3 road
- Franks River
- Tributary of Rio Minho

== See also ==
- Railways of Jamaica
