= Milk River Bath =

Mineral spa in Jamaica

Coordinates: 17.8538671°N 77.3523653°W

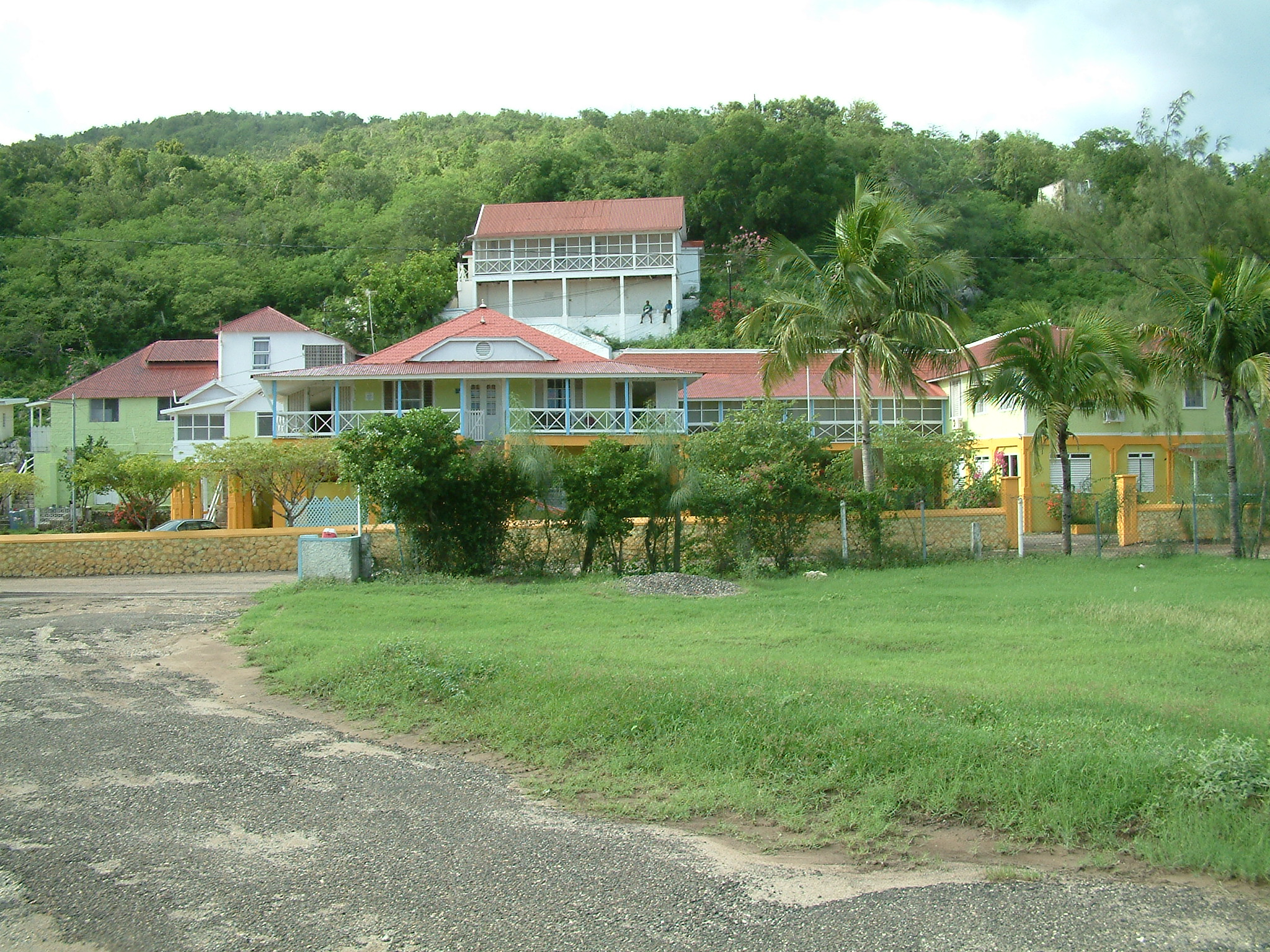
Milk River Bath

Milk River Bath is a mineral spa in the South West corner of Clarendon Parish, Jamaica. Owned by the Government of Jamaica since its opening in 1794, it now has about 6 public baths and a hotel with about 20 bedrooms. It claims that its warm waters are more radioactive than some other notable spas.

== Location ==
Milk River Bath is located about 2 miles South of the village of Milk River. The mineral spring rises at the foot of a hill side where Carpenter's Mountains meet the Vere Plains. The Milk River runs past the spa at a distance of about 100m on the other side of the road. The spa is about 12 miles South of the A2 road at Toll Gate. This approach road is often badly pot-holed in some places but is nevertheless passable with care in an ordinary car.

== Composition of the waters ==
- Calcium: 0.06%
- Magnesium: 0.07%
- Sodium 0.78%
- Sulphate: 0.19%
- Bicarbonate: 0.00006%
- Silica: 0.001%
- Chloride: 1.4%
- Carbonate: Nil
- Radioactivity:16 nCuries per litre (43 Mache Units)

The waters are 9 times as radioactive as those at Bath, England, and three times those at Karlovy Vary, Czech Republic.

== Description of Facilities ==
The 6 public baths are located in small private rooms off a seating area. The rooms are smartly tiled. Each can hold several people but the area for changing is really only suitable for one person at a time. The tepid water flows swiftly through the bath. The standard time for soaking is 15 minutes (for J$600 in 2008).

The hotel above the baths has about 20 bedrooms mostly ensuite. There is a cocktail bar and a restaurant. Food seems to be available specially cooked out of regular mealtimes.

Nearby is a swimming pool fed by the mineral waters, but this is not always open.

== History ==
It is said that during the 17th century a slave, after suffering a bad beating from his master and left for dead, returned a while later fully recovered. His master made a deal with him. The deal was for the slave to show him where he got healed and he would never punish him again.
