= Rocky Point, Jamaica =

Settlement in Jamaica

Coordinates: 17.772°N 77.264°W

Location of Rocky Point in Jamaica

Rocky Point is a settlement in Jamaica. It had a population of 3,183 as of 2009.

Rocky Point is a small community located on the southern coast of Clarendon.

== Geography and Environment ==
Rocky Point is situated on a promontory that juts out into the Caribbean Sea. The coastline is characterized by sandy beaches and, in some areas, rocks that give the location its name. The region has a tropical climate, with warm temperatures year-round and a rainy season that generally runs from May to November. The surrounding vegetation is typical of Jamaica's coastal biome, with mangroves in certain areas serving as nurseries for a variety of marine species.

== Economy ==
Rocky Point's economy is primarily driven by fishing. Local fishermen use small boats to catch a variety of fish and shellfish that are sold in local markets and restaurants. In addition to fishing, bauxite mining in the area has historically been a source of employment for some residents, although activity has fluctuated over the years. Small-scale agriculture is also practiced, with the production of crops such as melons and chili peppers, important to Jamaican cuisine.
