= Cocoa Tea =

Jamaican musician (1959–2025)

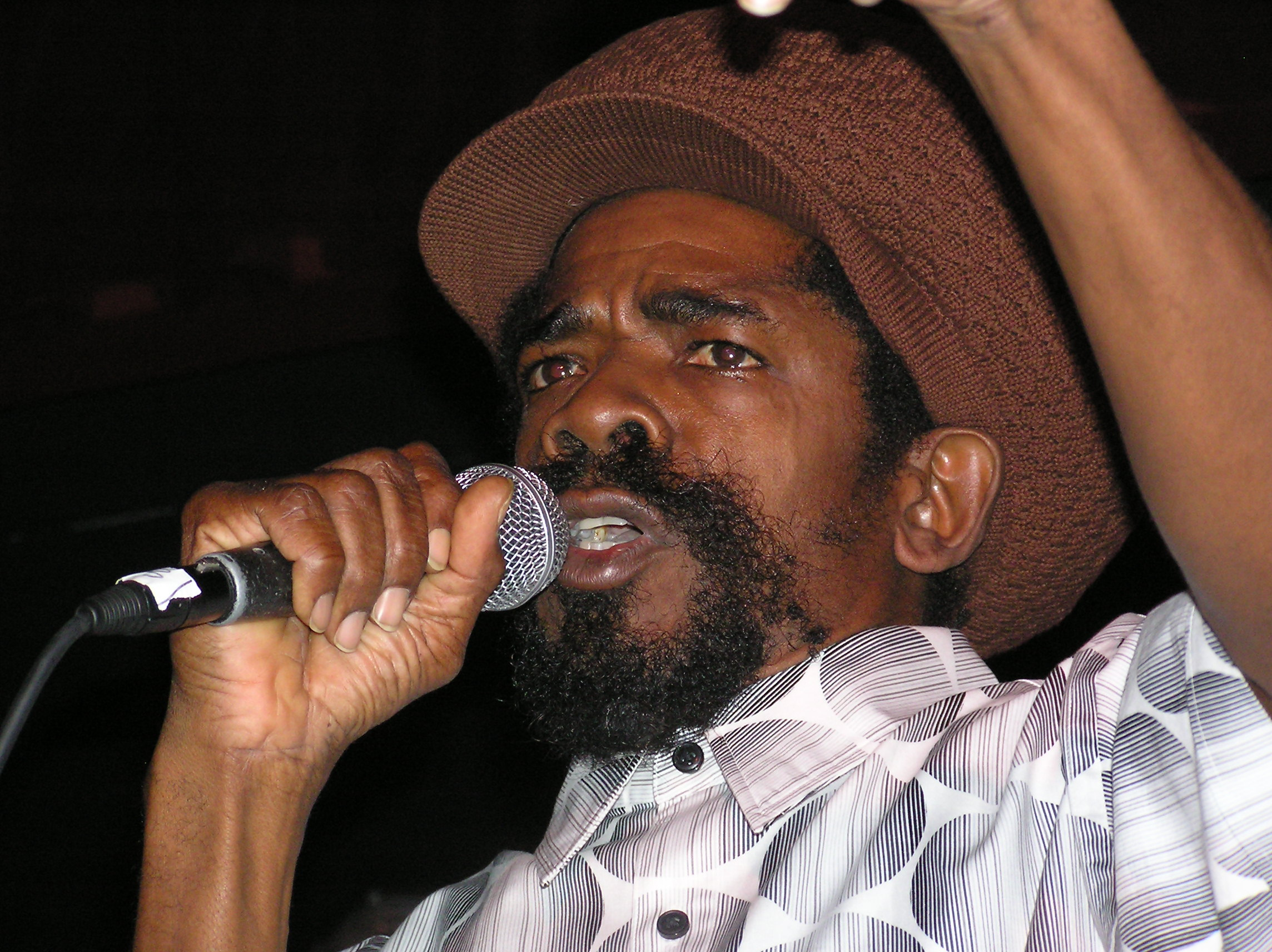
- Tea performing in 2004

Background information
- Born: Colvin George Scott; 3 September 1959; Rocky Point, Clarendon, Jamaica
- Origin: Hayes, Clarendon, Jamaica
- Died: 11 March 2025 (aged 65) Fort Lauderdale, Florida, U.S.
- Genres: Reggae, roots reggae
- Instrument: Vocals
- Years active: 1974–2022
- Labels: VP Records, Greensleeves, Volcano, Cornerstone, Roaring Lion

Colvin George Scott (3 September 1959 – 11 March 2025), better known as Cocoa Tea, was a Jamaican reggae singer and songwriter.

== Life and career ==
He was born in a fishing village of Rocky Point, Clarendon Parish, Jamaica on 3 September 1959, Cocoa Tea was one of the most popular singers in Jamaica from the 1980s onwards, achieving significant worldwide success in the reggae world.

He made his first venture into the music industry at 14 years of age in 1974, when he released the song "Searching In The Hills" for Willie Francis' Little Willie label. When the song failed to hit, the young Colvin gave up the music industry for a while, and spent some time working as a jockey and a fisherman over the next few years. Unable to stay away for too long he gained experience singing live on various sound systems before eventually found his way to Henry "Junjo" Lawes Volcano label in 1984, where he scored big hits with first "Rocking Dolly" and later "I Lost My Sonia", under the name Cocoa Tea.

From there his career continued to progress, leading to overseas tours and working with many other Jamaican producers. Some of his biggest hits of this era include "Young Lover" and "Children of the Ghetto" for Jammys label, as well as "Holding On" in collaboration with Home T and Shabba Ranks for Gussie Clarke's Music Works. In 1990 he released the hit song "Rikers Island" on the Mr Doo imprint, inspired by John Holt's 1977 song "Up Park Camp", with re-worked lyrics referencing the Rikers Island prison in New York City as a warning to young Jamaican immigrants of the time. He also voiced a version in combination with Nardo Ranks titled "Me No Like Rikers Island", which featured on the 1991 Columbia/SME Records compilation album, Dancehall Reggaespañol.

His success continued into the 1990s, with songs such as "Bust Outta Hell" again for Junjo, "Tune In" for Jammys, as well as working with new producers such as Philip "Fatis" Burrell on "Good Life" and "She Loves Me Now", and Bobby 'Digital' Dixon for "Moving On", "Heathen" and "No Threat". Many of these productions found their way onto albums released by international labels such as VP Records, Greensleeves and Ras Records. By this stage he had established himself as one of the top singers in the reggae world, and remained a favorite with fans, performing at almost every Reggae Sunsplash.

In 1997 he launched his own label, Roaring Lion Records, which achieved a good deal of success, releasing songs by some of the top artists on the island including Buju Banton, Louie Culture, Capleton, Cutty Ranks, Sizzla and of course "Sweet Sweet" Cocoa Tea himself. He gained notoriety in March 2008 after releasing a song titled "Barack Obama" on the label in support of the US presidential candidate of the same name. Cocoa Tea's song "Jah Made Them That Way" from his 1984 album Rocking Dolly, interpolates "Human Nature" by Michael Jackson and "Answer Mi Question" by Dillinger.

He initiated the annual New Year's Eve events Dancehall Jam Jam in 2003 which ran until 2009.

Cocoa Tea died from a cardiac arrest on 11 March 2025, at the age of 65.

== Discography ==
=== Albums ===
- Weh Dem A Go Do...Can't Stop Cocoa Tea (1984), Volcano
- I Lost My Sonia (1985), Volcano
- Settle Down (1985), Corner Stone
- Mr. Coco Tea (1985), Corner Stone
- Sweet Sweet Coco Tea (1985), Blue Mountain
- The Marshall (1985), Jammy's
- Cocoa Tea (1986), Jimpy's
- Come Again (1987), Jammy's
- Rikers Island (1991), VP
- Rocking Dolly (1991), RAS
- Authorized (1991), Greensleeves
- Kingston Hot (1992), RAS
- I Am the Toughest (1992), VP
- Weh Dem A Go Do - Can't Stop Cocoa Tea (1992), VP
- One Up (1993), Greensleeves
- Good Life (1994), VP
- Sweet Love (1994), VP
- Tune In (1994), Greensleeves
- Can't Live So (1994), Shanachie
- Come Love Me (1995), VP
- Israel's King (1996), VP
- Holy Mount Zion (1997), Motown
- One Way (1998), VP
- Unforgettable (2000), Roaring Lion
- Feel the Power (2001), VP
- Tek Weh Yuh Gal (2004), Kings of Kings
- Save Us Oh Jah (2006), VP
- Biological Warfare (2007), Minor7Flat5
- Yes We Can (2009), Roaring Lion
- In a Di Red (2012), VP
- Sunset in Negril (2014), Roaring Lion

=== Split albums ===
- Corner Stone Presents Clash Of The 80's (1986), Corner Stone - Cocoa Tea & Barrington Levy
- Clash (1985), Hawkeye - Tenor Saw & Cocoa Tea
- Showdown Vol 8 (1986), Hitbound - Frankie Paul & Cocoa Tea
- Another One for the Road (1991), Greensleeves - Home T, Cocoa Tea, and Cutty Ranks
- Holding On (1991), VP - Cocoa Tea, Shabba Ranks, and Home T, a.k.a. Pirate's Anthem
- Sanchez Meets Cocoa Tea (1993), Jet Star - with Sanchez
- Legit (1993), Shananchie - Cocoa Tea, Freddie McGregor, and Dennis Brown
- Israel Vibration Meets Cocoa Tea (1999), Cactus
- Another One For The Road (Greensleeves 30th Anniversary Edition) (2007), Greensleeves - Home T, Cocoa Tea, and Cutty Ranks

=== Compilation albums ===
- 20 Tracks of Cocoa Tea (1991), Sonic Sounds
- RAS Portraits (1997), RAS.
- In His Early Days (1998), Corner Stone
- Best Of (1999), Socadisc
- Reggae Legends Vol 3 (1999), Artists Only
- Kings of Reggae (2002), Nocturne
- Live in Jamaica (2002), Sankofa
- Reggae Anthology: The Sweet Sound of Cocoa Tea (2008), 17 North Parade
- Reggae Legends (2009), 17 North Parade
- The Best of Cocoa Tea (2012), Jammy's
- Music is Our Business (2019), VP

== In popular culture ==
His song "We Do The Killing" was sampled in the Pendulum song "Set Me On Fire", which is included on their album Immersion This specific version of his song was a clash version, the lyrics rewritten specifically to address disrespect.
