= Palmers Cross =

- Suburb
- Location within Jamaica
- Coordinates: 17.95089°N 77.20973°W
- Country: Jamaica
- Parish: Clarendon

Palmers Cross is a district in south-central Jamaica, located to the east of May Pen and north of Sandy Bay in the parish of Clarendon. The approximate population of Palmers Cross is 26,262.

Palmers Cross is the home of The Container Project, a non-profit UNESCO project bringing technology and self-sustainable media training to 'hard-to-reach' young people in Jamaica.

== History ==
On the UK Directorate of Overseas Surveys 1:50,000 map of 1973, two small, neighbouring communities are shown in this vicinity, both centred on minor road junctions:

1. a village called The Cross with a school and postal agency
2. a hamlet called Palmers

It seems that in the years since they have grown and merged, their names being combined in the process.

== Amenities ==
There is a Junior High School formerly called Cross All-Age School. The name of the school is currently Cross Primary School. The closest health center is the Sandy Bay Health Center which is located in Sandy Bay. A doctor's office is also located at the Moments Plaza in the district. Residents can also visit the May Pen Hospital and the Main Street Health Center for medical assistance.
