= Slatina, Foča =

Slatina
- Village
- Location within Bosnia and Herzegovina
- Coordinates: 43°32′44″N 18°54′51″E
- Country: Bosnia and Herzegovina
- Entity: Republika Srpska
- Municipality: Foča
- Time zone: UTC+1 (CET)
  - Summer (DST): UTC+2 (CEST)

Slatina (Serbian Cyrillic: Слатина) is a village in the municipality of Foča, Republika Srpska, Bosnia and Herzegovina.
