= Clarendon Parish, Jamaica =

Parish of Jamaica

Clarendon Clarindan
- Parish
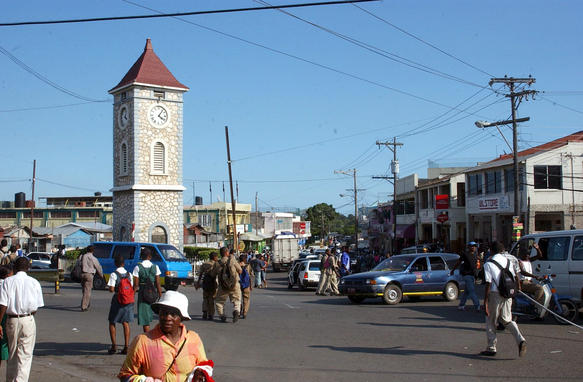
- May Pen town centre

- Clarendon in Jamaica
- Coordinates: 18°00′N 77°17′W
- Country: Jamaica
- County: Middlesex
- Named for: Edward Hyde, 1st Earl of Clarendon
- Parish capital: May Pen
- Largest city: May Pen

Area
  - Total: 1,196 km^{2} (462 sq mi)

Population (2015)
  - Total: 253,462
- Demonym: Clarendonies
- Website: Clarendon Municipal Corporation

Clarendon (Jamaican Patois: Clarindan) is a parish in Jamaica. It is located on the south of the island, roughly halfway between the island's eastern and western ends. Located in the county of Middlesex, it is bordered by Manchester on the west, Saint Catherine in the east, and in the north by Saint Ann. Its capital and largest town is May Pen.

== History ==
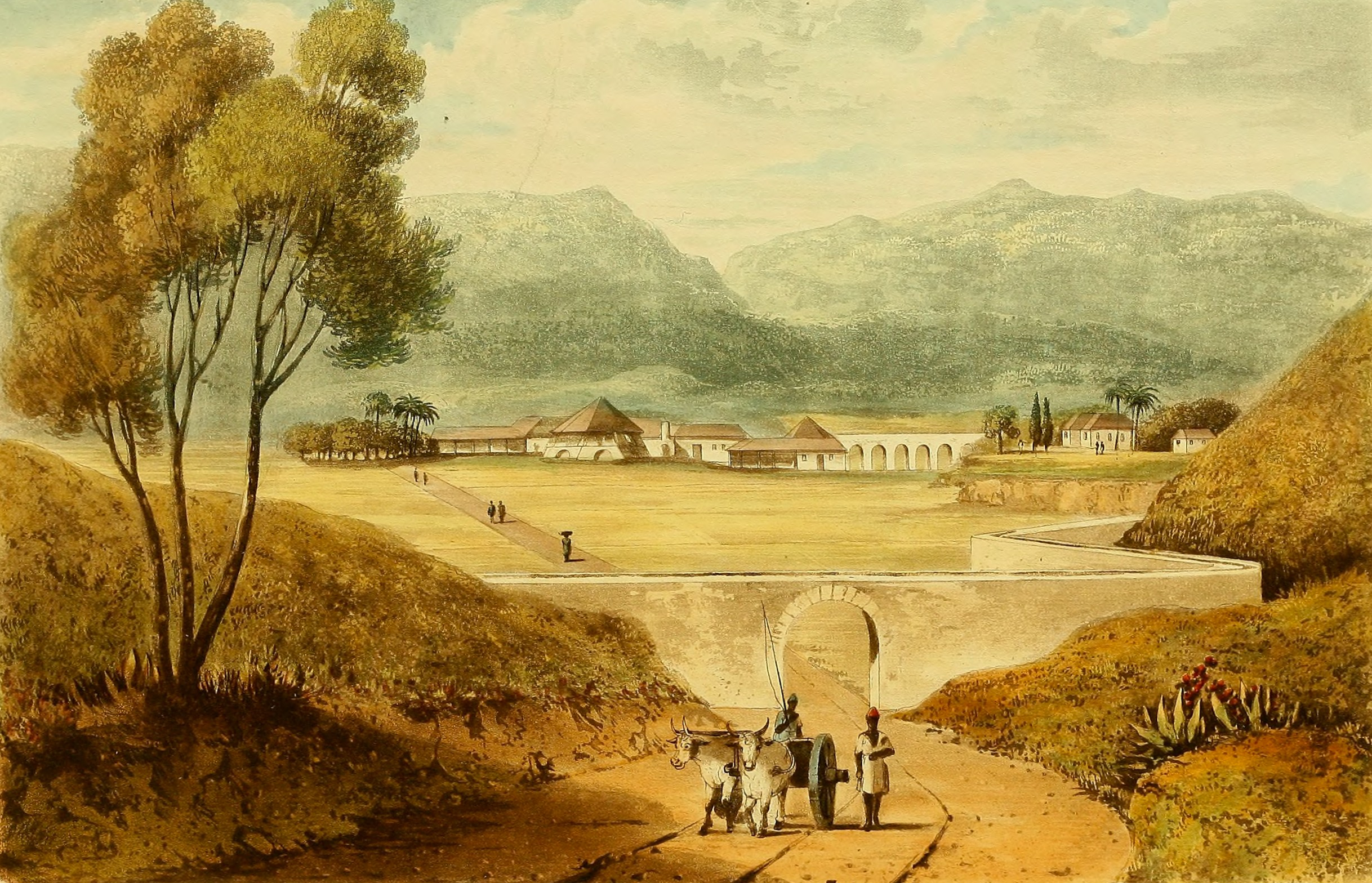
Whitney Estate 1824

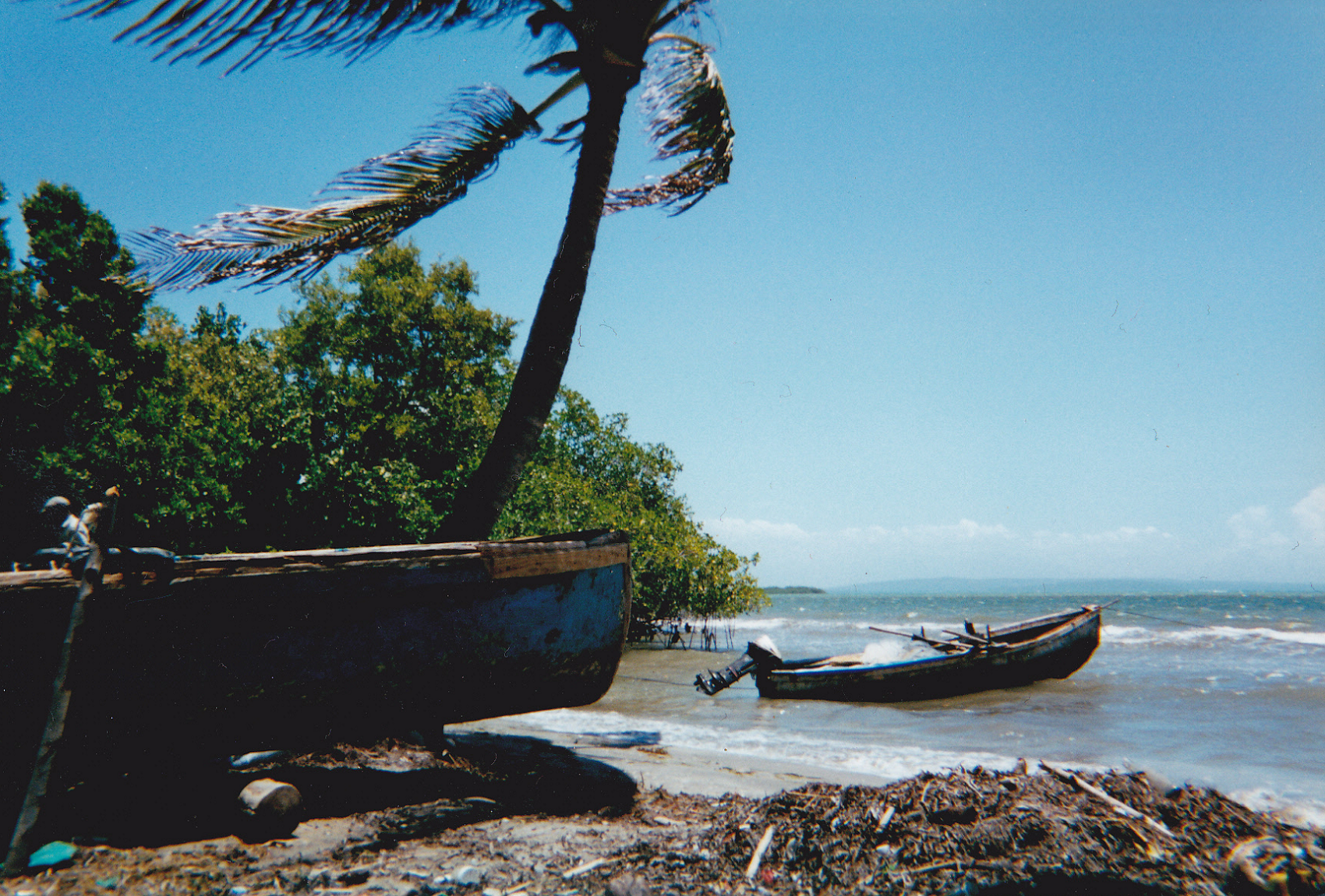
Welcome Beach, Salt River Road, Clarendon

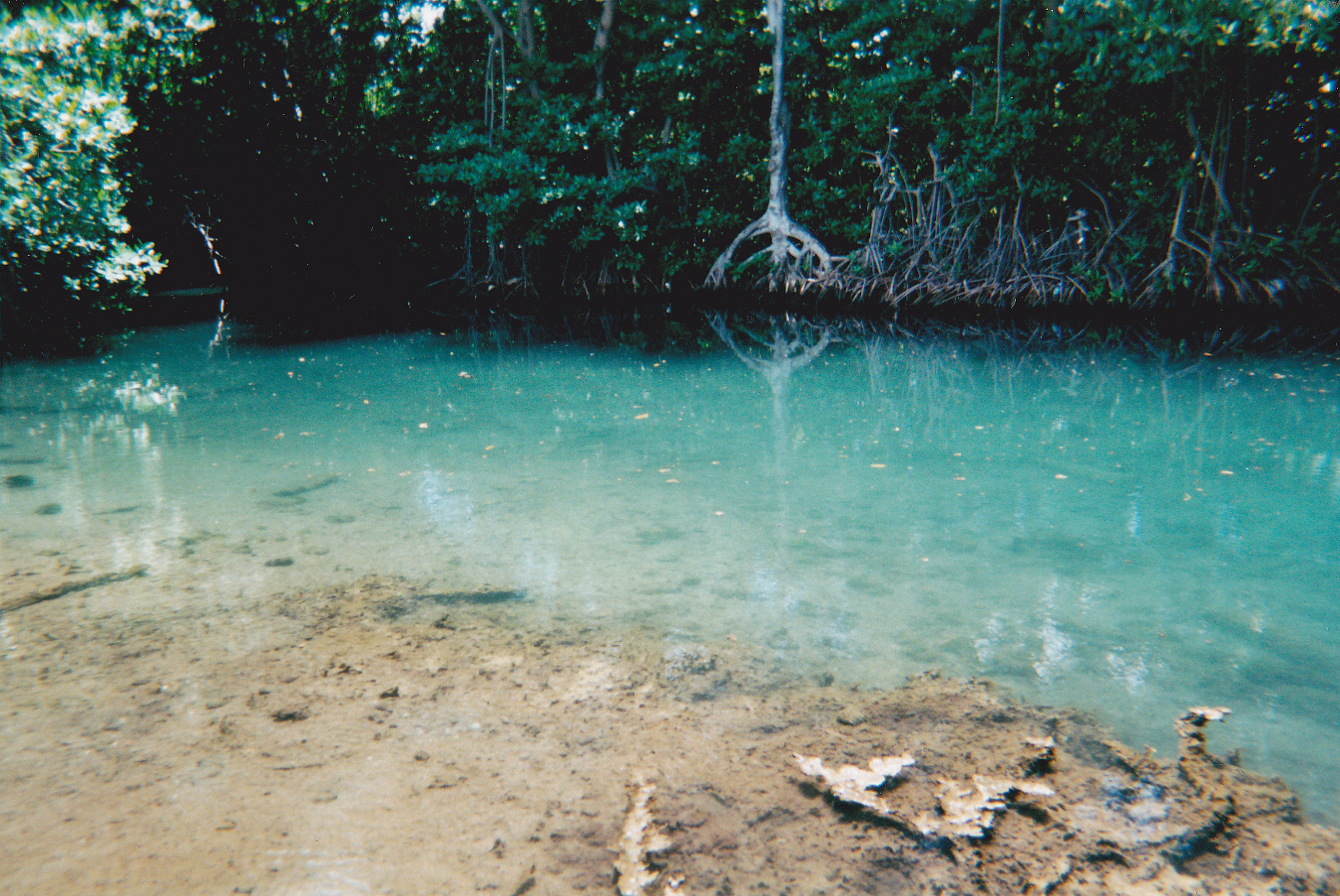
Stream from Lionel Town Pool, Clarendon

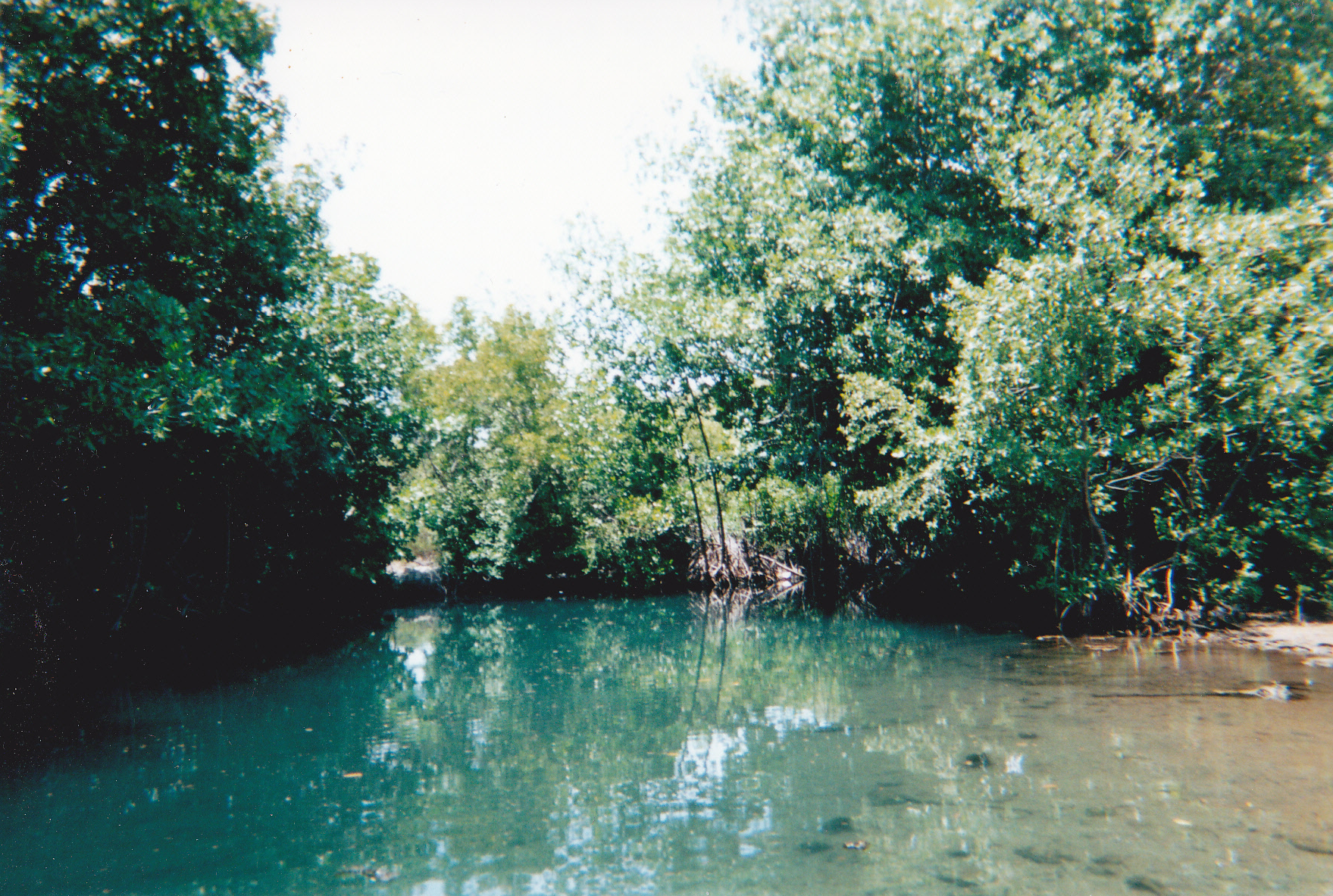
Looking upstream towards Lionel Town spring 200 metres away

Clarendon was named in honour of the Lord Chancellor Sir Edward Hyde, Earl of Clarendon. The most recent parish was formed from a combination of three parishes: St. Dorothy's, Vere and the old parish of Clarendon. Before the merger, the capital was Chapelton. Clarendon Parish was one of the original seven Anglican parishes of Jamaica set up by Sir Thomas Modyford in 1664, and it has been reorganized numerous times since. Parish registers, which are records kept by the parish church of religious events such as baptisms, marriages, and burials, are still extant from Clarendon parish almost as far back as its foundation, with the first recorded baptism dated in 1666.

== Geography and population ==
Covering an area of 1,196 km^{2}, Clarendon ranks as Jamaica's third largest parish. The parish is predominantly a wide plain, marked by several rivers, including the Rio Minho, which runs the length of the parish. Toward the northern end of the parish lies the Mocho Mountains (2000 ft), and Bull Head Mountain range (2800 ft), which is considered to be the geographical centre of the island. The Vere plain is another significant geographical feature.

Portland Point, the southernmost point of Jamaica, is on a peninsula in Clarendon that also hosts Portland Point Lighthouse. On the same peninsula are Jackson Bay beach, the flood-prone community of Portland Cottage, and two different locations both called Rocky Point: a residential community on the western side of the peninsula, and a port used primarily for the export of alumina on the eastern side of the peninsula.

With a population at an estimated 253,462 in 2015, Clarendon is one of the most populous parishes in the island. May Pen, the capital, has a population estimated at around 77,549.

=== Notable towns ===
- Chapelton
- Hayes
- Frankfield
- Mattinee
- Lionel Town
- May Pen
- Palmers Cross
- Race Course
- Rocky Point
- Smithville
- [Kemps Hill]

== Economy ==
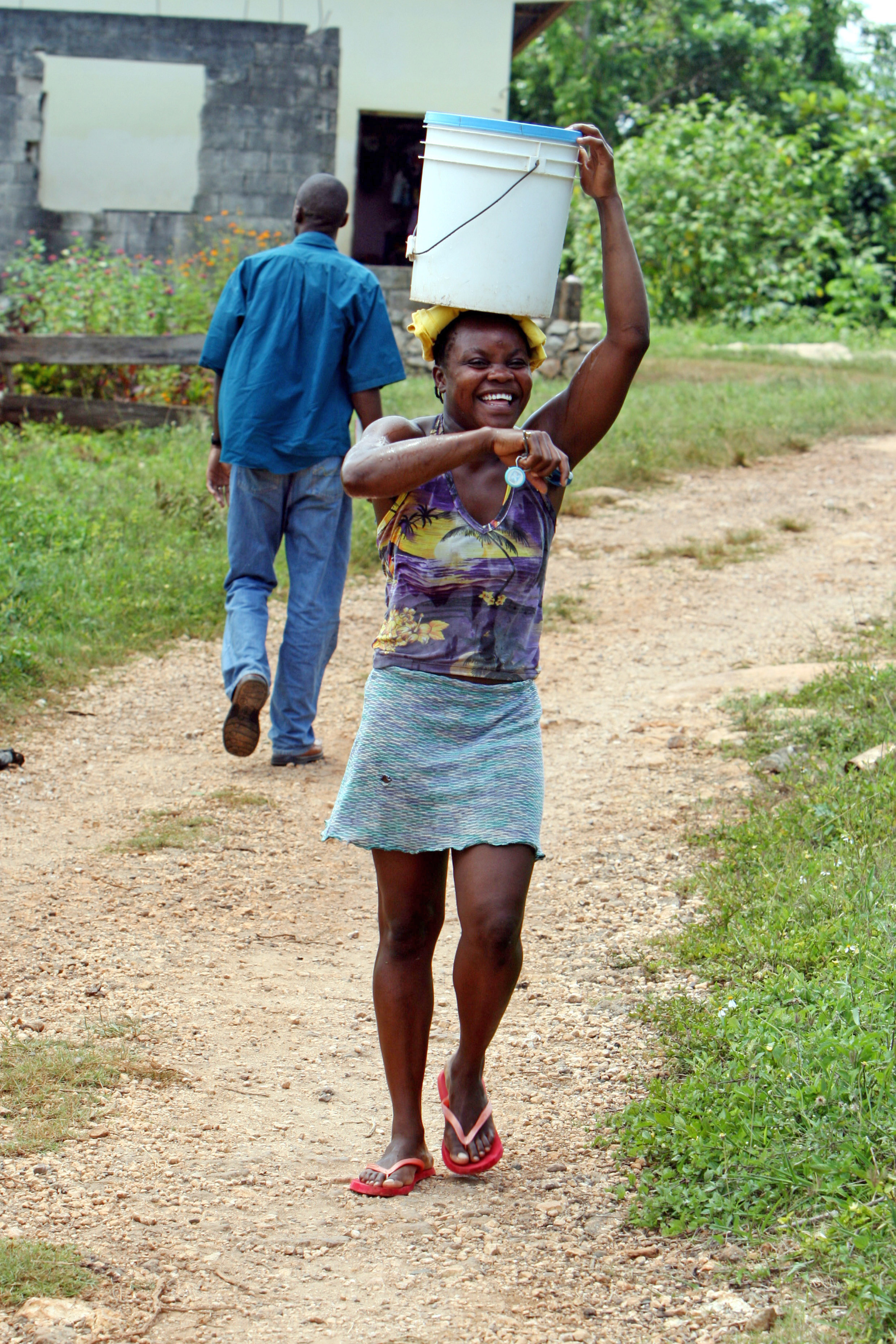
Young woman carrying a water bucket, Clarendon

Bauxite, Jamaica's major mineral source, can be found extensively in Clarendon. Bauxite mining has been established in the parish by JAMALCO and ALCOA. Most of the island's tobacco is also grown in Clarendon, along with cotton, allspice (colloquially referred to as pimento), ginger, livestock, indigo, bananas, coffee, and cocoa. May Pen is also an important citrus packing centre, famous for 'Trout Hall' oranges. Additionally, dairy farming, fish farming, and copper mining have been carried on intermittently, and the sugar-cane production contributes significantly to the amount of sugar exported annually. The Denbigh agricultural showground is on the outskirts of May Pen.

One of the top ten credit unions in Jamaica, GSB Co-operative Credit Union has a branch here.

Clarendon is the location of the Milk River Bath, a mineral spa famous for the therapeutic value of its waters. The oldest church on the island is in Alley, the old capital of Vere.

Halse Hall Great House is one of the island's historic houses. The land on which the house stands was given to an English officer, Major Thomas Halse, in 1655, and was passed from him to Francis Sadler Halse. Halse played a leading role in the Maroon Wars.

The Denbigh Agricultural Show Grounds – once a year, on the weekend prior to Independence celebrations, a national Agriculture Show is staged here.

Vernamfield was the first car-racing track established in Jamaica. The track is located on the former American lend lease air base, Vernam Field (later Vernam Air Force Base) that was named in honor of World War I flyer Remington de B. Vernam. Vernam Field is known for drag racing.

- The Woodleigh racetrack outside of May Pen is known for dirtbike racing.
- It is the home of the New Yarmouth, Sevens Estate and Moneymusk Sugar factories.

== Politics ==
Clarendon Parish elects six MPs to the Parliament of Jamaica.

- Clarendon Central
- Clarendon Northern
- Clarendon North Central
- Clarendon North Western
- Clarendon South Eastern
- Clarendon South Western

== Places of interest ==
- Halse Hall Great House
- Milk River Bath
- Rio Minho
- Vernam Field

== Notable people ==
- Dennis Alcapone (born 1947), reggae DJ and producer
- Michael Allen (born 1964), Canadian football player
- Rodolph Austin (born 1985), footballer
- Davina Bennett (born 1996), model, Miss Universe 2017 Top 3
- Michael Blackwood (born 1976), athlete
- Simon Brown (born 1963), boxer
- Cocoa Tea, born Calvin George Scott (1959–2025), reggae singer
- Rohan Davey (born 1978), American football quarterback
- R. James deRoux (1930-2012), Businessman and longest serving Custos of Clarendon 1981-2011
- Lacena Golding-Clarke (born 1975), sprinter
- Mona Hammond (1931–2022), actress
- Dalton Harris (born 1993), singer
- Toots Hibbert (1942–2020), singer of Toots & The Maytals
- Elizabeth Home, Countess of Home (1703/04–1784), heiress and plantation owner
- Charles Howard, 1st Earl of Carlisle (1628–1685), governor of Jamaica from 1678–1680
- Leonard Howell (1898–1981), founder of Rastafari, born in Clarendon 1898
- Glen Johnson (born 1969), boxer
- Linton Kwesi Johnson (born 1952), poet
- Doreen Lawrence, Baroness Lawrence of Clarendon (born 1952), mother of Stephen Lawrence
- Stephen Lawrence (1974–1993), murdered in Eltham, London, buried in Clarendon
- Barrington Levy (born 1964), singer
- Atlee Mahorn (born 1965), Canadian sprinter
- Freddie McGregor (born 1956), singer
- Claude McKay (1890–1948), part of the Harlem Renaissance, born in James Hill
- Liz Mitchell, of Boney M. (born 1952), singer
- Derrick Morgan (born 1940), musical artist
- Raphael Morgan (Robert Josias Morgan) (c. 1866–1922), missionary and first Black Orthodox priest in the U.S.
- OMI (born 1986), reggae singer
- Levi Roots (born 1958), born Keith Valentine Graham, singer, chef
- Catherine Scott (born 1973), athlete
- Jah Shaka (died 2023), cultural figure, sound system operator
- Millie Small (1947–2020), singer and songwriter, best known for "My Boy Lollipop"
- Super Cat (born 1963), DJ
- Roger Thompson (born 1991), Canadian soccer player
