= May Pen =

- Town
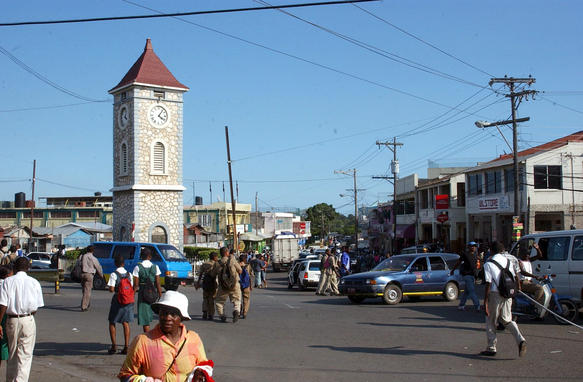
- May Pen town centre; the large open-air market is just behind the buildings on the left

- Location in Jamaica
- Coordinates: 17.965°N 77.245°W
- Country: Jamaica
- County: Middlesex
- Parish: Clarendon
- Established: 1660-1683

Population
  - Total: 61,548 ^{(2011 census)}
- Time zone: UTC-5 (EST)
- Area code: 876

May Pen is the capital and largest town in the parish of Clarendon in Middlesex County, Jamaica. It is located on the Rio Minho river, and is a major market centre for the parish. The population was 61,548 at the 2011 census increasing from 59,550 in 2001, including the surrounding suburbs of Sandy Bay, Mineral Heights, Hazard, Palmers Cross, Denbigh, Race Track, and Four Paths among others. The town has a mayor.

== Description ==
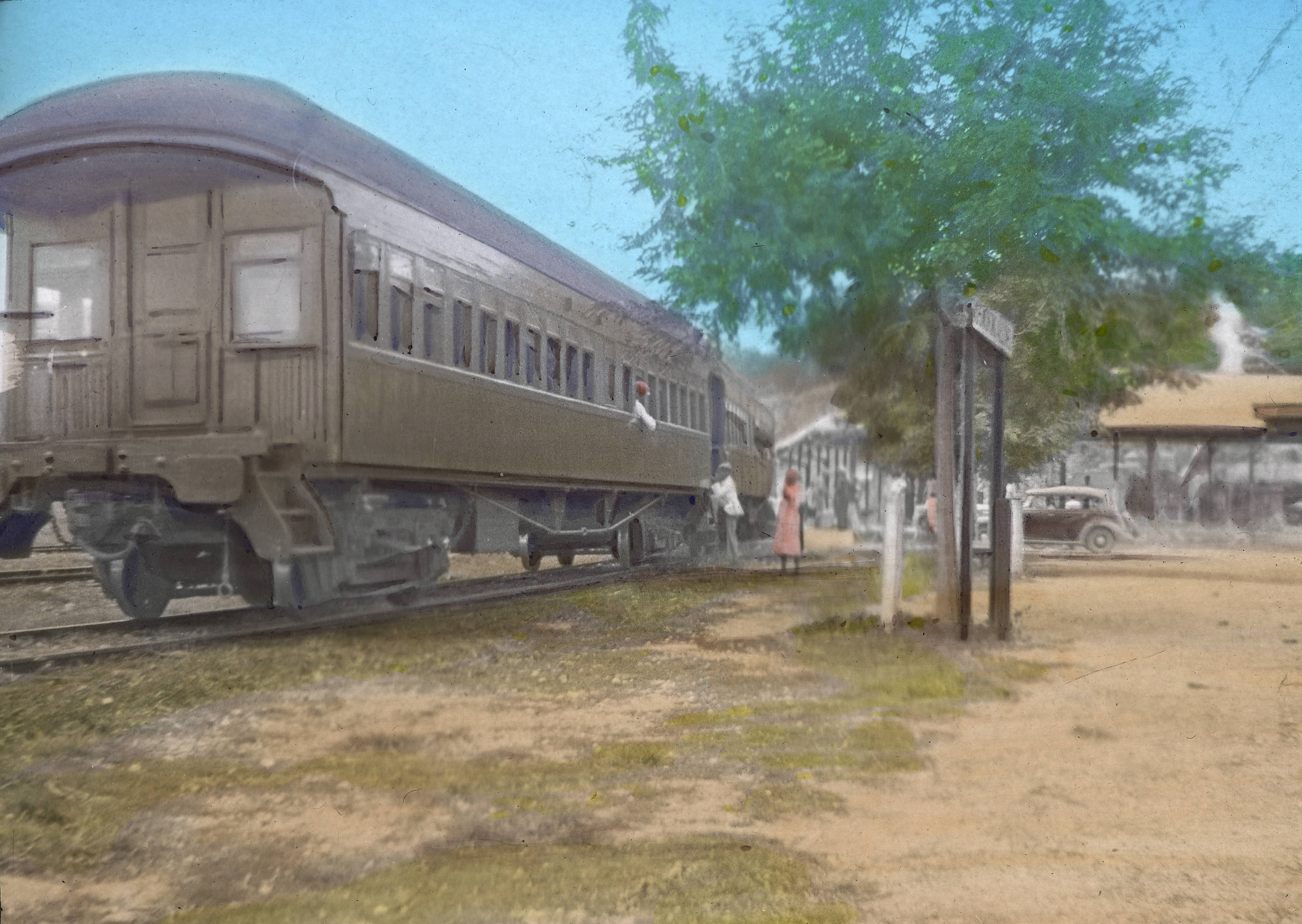
Railway Train at May Pen Station

May Pen, originally May's Pen, was established as a pen (cattle farm) settlement by the British between 1660 and 1683 on a crossing point of the Rio Minho river. It became part of an estate named after its owner, slave trader Reverend William May, who was born in England in 1695 but in his later years resided in Jamaica. He oversaw 27 slaves on this estate and was rector of the Kingston Parish Church but was later transferred to Clarendon, where he served for 32 years.

May Pen is well located from an administrative point of view in the centre of a largely agricultural parish, and as a midpoint on the Kingston to Manchester road. Boasting a large open air market and transportation centre along Main Street and Sevens Road, the town's centre is often chaotic with activities of shoppers, vendors daily and motorized traffic. May Pen also has many banks, hardware stores, pharmacies and eateries. The town also has a large post office, headquarters for local government, and court house.

The clock tower in the town centre was erected in 1908 after the death of a doctor Robert Glaister Samuel Bell who drowned while attempting to cross the Rio Minho river in 1904. As well as having a memorial plaque to Bell, it has another dedicated to World War I (1914-1918). The town has three crossings over the Rio Minho. The first bridge was built by 1874 for the local railway company, By the 1910s the bridge was not coping with the heavy steam trains, so shunting was required which could take up to half an hour. This would cause regular hold ups of road traffic using the structure so a new crossing was devised, and the present steel bridge was opened alongside in January 1925, some 45–50 feet (14–15 m) above the river and dedicated initially for the railway only. The older crossing was then used exclusively by road traffic but it continued to deteriorate until 1948 when it was condemned by the authorities and demolished by 1950. An in-situ replacement road bridge was proposed, but the road was instead re-routed over the railway bridge and this remained in dual use until the Jamaica Railway Corporation ceased mainline operations in 1992. No further crossings were built until the May Pen bypass was developed a mile to the west in 1982, and as part of the parallel T1 Highway 2000 route in 2012.

May Pen is also an important citrus packing centre, including oranges and a hybrid citrus fruit called an ugli. The Denbigh Agricultural Showground is located approximately three miles west of the centre of the town. May Pen's geographical position is situated near the centre of the entire island. May Pen has long been viewed as one of Jamaica's most important agriculture towns. During its heyday of Jamaican bauxite mining, citrus and sugar production, Clarendon was among Jamaica's leading parishes in terms of economic activity. With the now defunct Jamaica Railway Corporation, May Pen then served as the crossroads of Jamaica natural resources, connecting Frankfield and its citrus plantations in the north of the parish, with Lionel Town and its sugar production in the South. The Alcoa mining and refinery in partnership with the Jamaican government (Jamalco), located south of the town, is the single largest employer of the town, along with the Trout Hall citrus business. The Denbigh Agricultural Show Ground is the largest in the English-speaking Caribbean, and has served to promote regional farmers agriculture, textile and livestock production. Held annually during Jamaica's Independence Celebration weekend, Denbigh often attracted large crowds from all parts of the island to see Jamaica's best in agricultural output, and enjoy festive activities.

While May Pen has no universities, it does have several public and private schools, including Central High School, Denbigh High School, Glenmuir High School (Anglican), Glenmuir Preparatory School (Anglican primary), May Pen High School (Adventist private), May Pen Primary School, Foundation Preparatory School, and St. Thomas Moore Preparatory School (Catholic primary).

== Notable people ==
- Frederick "Toots" Hibbert, reggae and ska singer, and frontman for Toots & the Maytals, was born in May Pen
- Andre Blake, footballer for Philadelphia Union and Jamaica
- Camaal Reid, footballer for Scarborough SC and Jamaica

== Suburbs ==
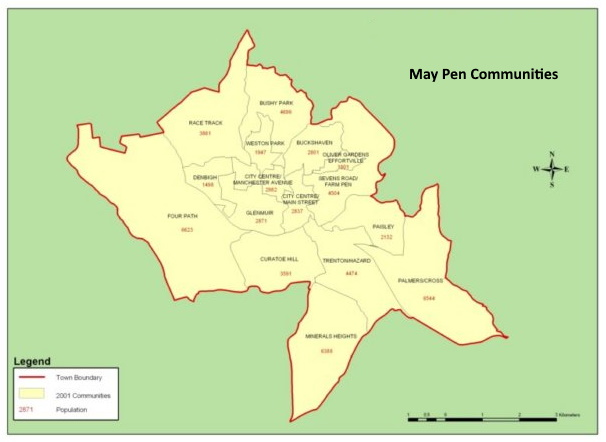
Map of May Pen, Clarendon, Jamaica showing suburbs and boundaries

May Pen consists of 16 communities:

- City Centre/Main St
- City Centre/Manchester Av
- Bushy Park
- Buckshaven
- Curatoe Hill
- Denbigh
- Four Paths
- Glenmuir
- Mineral Heights
- Paisley
- Palmers Cross
- Oliver Gardens/Effortville
- Race Track
- Sevens Road/Farm Pen
- Trenton/Hazard
- Weston Park
