= Ailford's halt =

General information
- Coordinates: 18.422535°N 77.945951°W
- Owner: Jamaica Railway Corporation
- Line: Railways of Jamaica: Kingston to Montego Bay

History
- Opened: c1894
- Closed: 1992
Location
- Location within Jamaica

Ailford's halt opened in c.1894 and closed in 1992. It was on the Kingston to Montego Bay line, 106.75 miles (171.80 km) from the Kingston terminus, and served the surrounding agricultural community.

== Architecture ==
By definition, halts have no station building or platform.

== Track layout ==
A single track with a marked place for trains to stop alongside the B8 road, which runs from Ferris Corner (near Savanna-la-Mar) to Reading (near Montego Bay).

== Fares ==
In 1910 the third class fare from Albany to Kingston was 8/- (eight shillings); first class was about double.

== See also ==
- Railways of Jamaica
- Railway stations in Jamaica

== Bibliography ==
- Satchell, Veront M & Sampson, Cezley (2003), The rise and fall of railways in Jamaica 1845-1975, The Journal of Transport History, archived from the original on November 2, 2007
