= Spanish Town railway station =

Railway station in Jamaica

Spanish Town
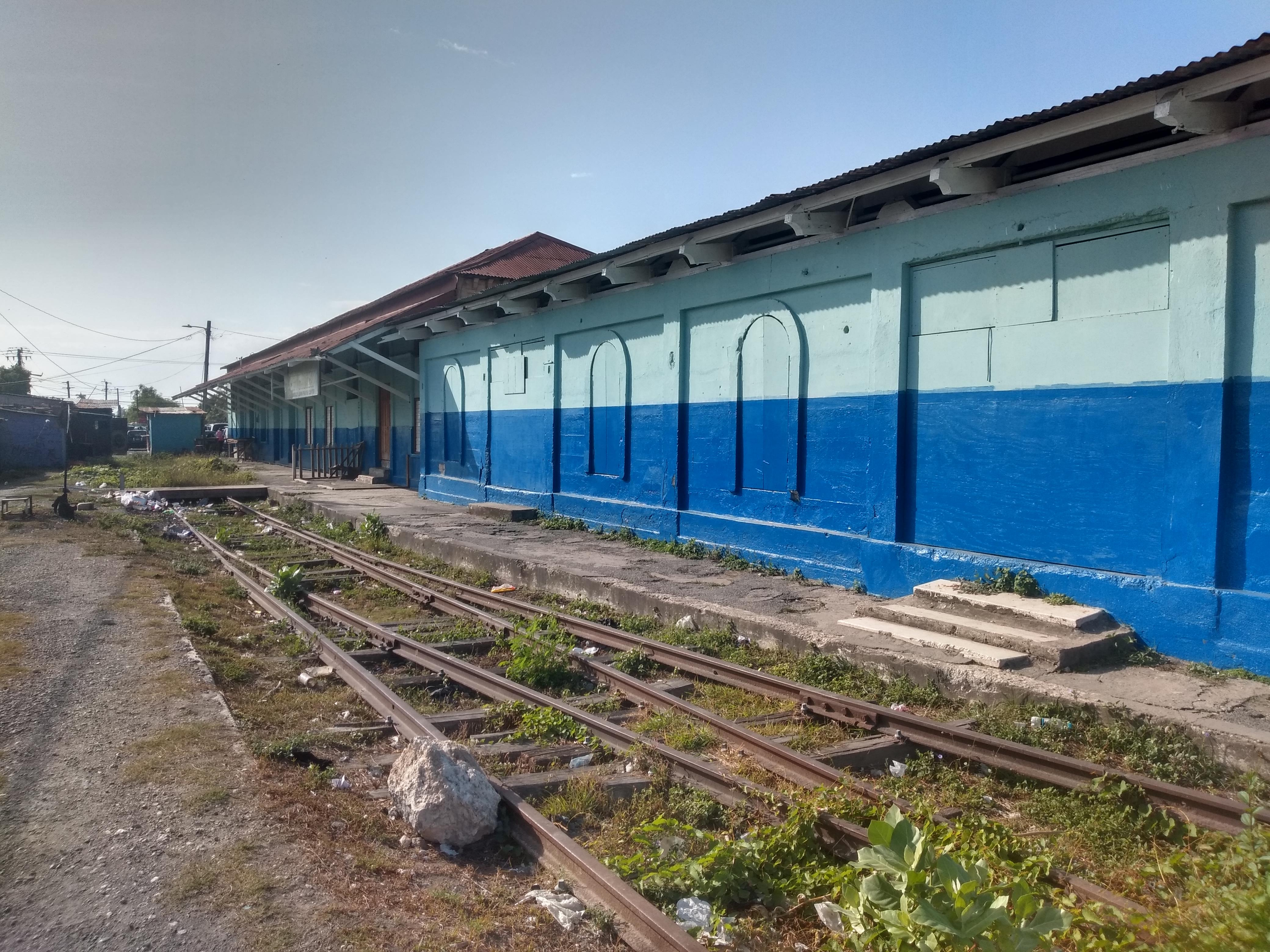

General information
- Coordinates: 17.990310°N 76.955355°W
- Owner: Jamaica Railway Corporation
- Lines: Kingston to Montego Bay main line Spanish Town to Ewarton branch line Bog Walk to Port Antonio branch line Linstead to New Works branch line
- Platforms: Single, two sided platform
- Tracks: Two

History
- Opened: 1845
- Closed: 1992-10
Location
- Location within Jamaica

Spanish Town railway station opened in 1845 and closed in 1992 when all passenger services in Jamaica abruptly ceased. It provided rail services to Kingston and Montego Bay, Port Antonio, Ewarton and New Works. It was 11.75 miles (18.91 km) from the Kingston terminus. It is on the list of designated National Heritage Sites in Jamaica.

== Architecture ==
The station was built in 1845 in Jamaica Georgian style from brick on a stone base. The roof overhang is supported by timber posts in wall mounted cast iron brackets on its northern side and by wall mounted timber brackets on its southern side. It has sash windows, solid recessed panel doors and a long zinc hip roof.

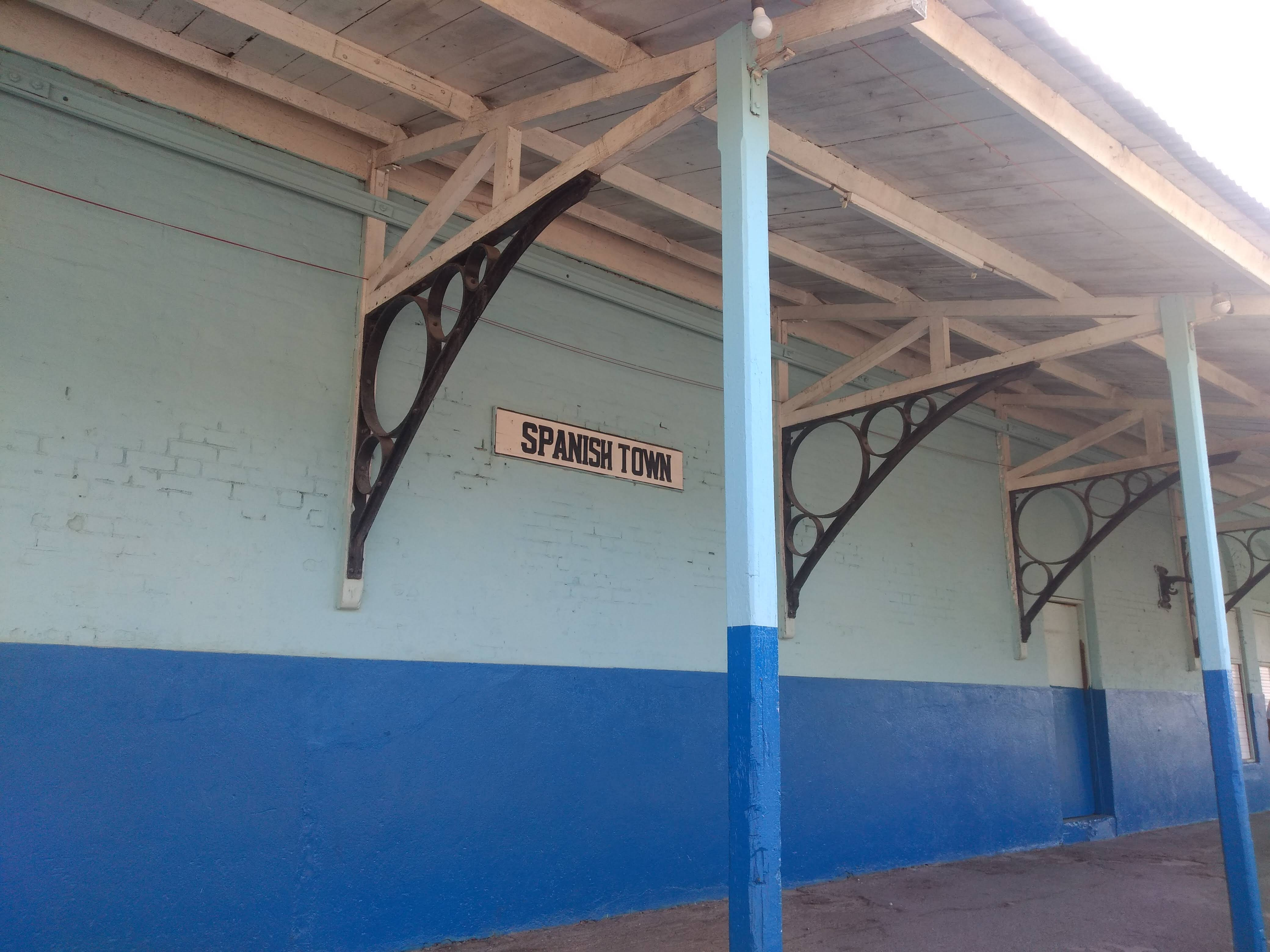
Spanish Town sign on southern platform, May 2021

In 2003 it was reported as being in "very poor condition" and "in need of major repairs".

== Track layout ==
In addition to the station and its single, twin sided platform there were sidings, an engine shed and a junction between the Kingston to Montego Bay main line and the Spanish Town to Ewarton branch.

== Fares ==
In 1910 the third class fare from Spanish Town to Kingston was 1/- (one shilling); first class was about double.

== See also ==
- Railway stations in Jamaica
