= Montego Bay railway station =

Railway station in Jamaica

Montego Bay
- Montego Bay railway station c1905

General information
- Coordinates: 18.468583°N 77.922029°W
- Owner: Jamaica Railway Corporation
- Line: Kingston to Montego Bay main line
- Platforms: 1
- Tracks: Single with sidings and branches to piers, works, sheds, etc.

History
- Opened: c1894
- Closed: 1992-10
Location
- Location within Jamaica

Montego Bay railway station opened in 1894 and closed in 1992 when all passenger services in Jamaica abruptly ceased. It served the Kingston to Montego Bay main line with branches from May pen to Frankfield, Spanish Town to Ewarton, Bog Walk to Port Antonio and Linstead to New Works. It was 112.75 miles (181.45 km) from the Kingston terminus.

== Architecture ==
The station was a simple two story timber building with a gable end zinc roof partially supported by timber posts with finger-like timber brackets. Solid recessed panel doors and sash windows were used throughout the building.

In 2003 it was reported as being in "deplorable condition" and "in need of major repairs".

== Track layout ==
In addition to the station with its single platform there were freight sidings, an engine shed, two short branch lines to piers and (almost certainly) a turn table.

== Fares ==
In 1910 the third class fare from Montego Bay to Kingston was 8/- (eight shillings); first class was about double.

== See also ==
- Railway stations in Jamaica
