= Gregory Park railway station =

Railway station in Jamaica

Gregory Park
- Gregory Park railway station, February 1980

General information
- Coordinates: 17.995856°N 76.881530°W
- Owner: Jamaica Railway Corporation
- Line: Kingston to Montego Bay main line
- Platforms: Single
- Tracks: One

History
- Opened: 1845
- Closed: 1992-10; since destroyed by fire
Location
- Location within Jamaica

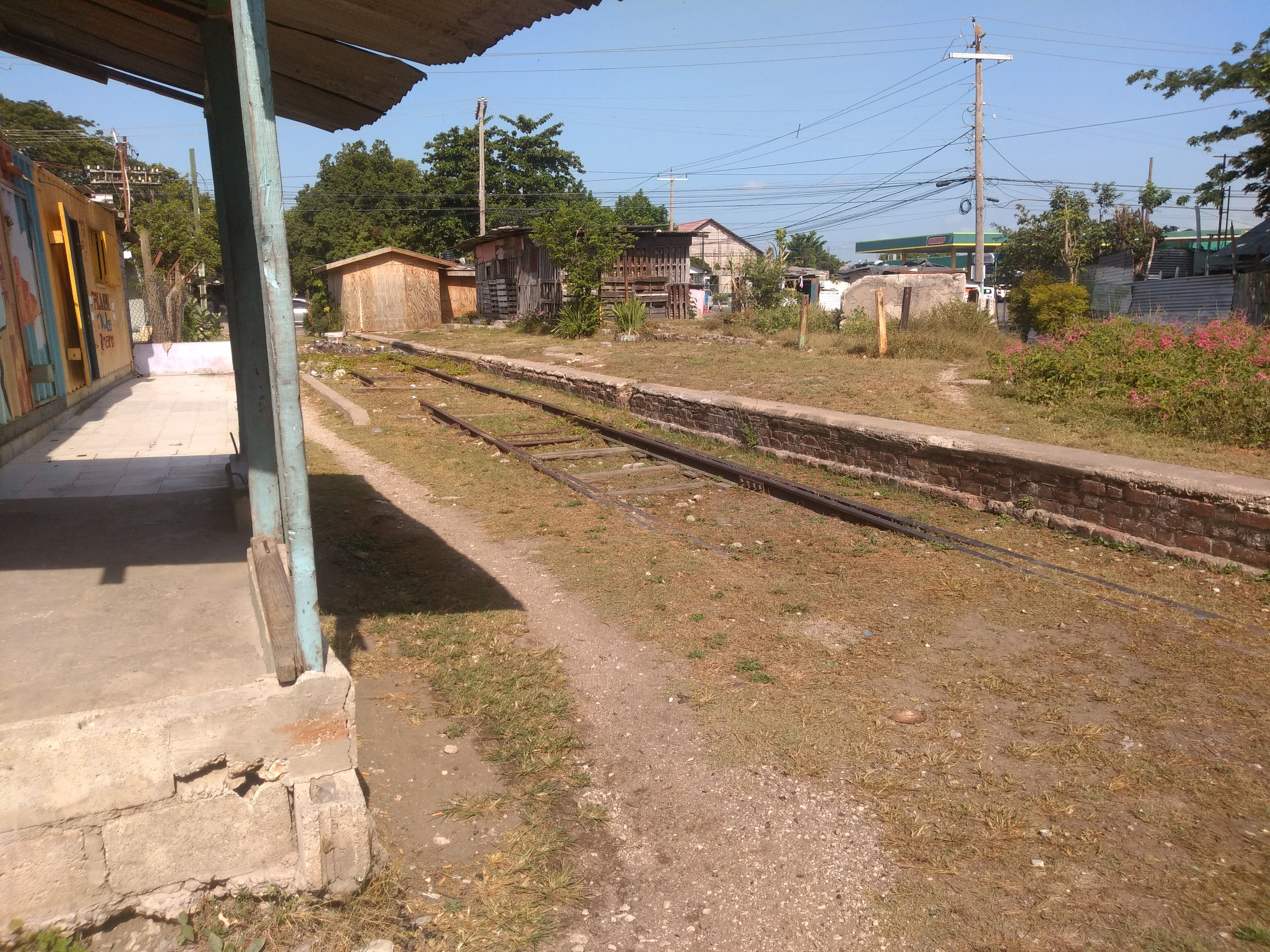
Platform of Gregory Park Railway Station still visible, May 2021

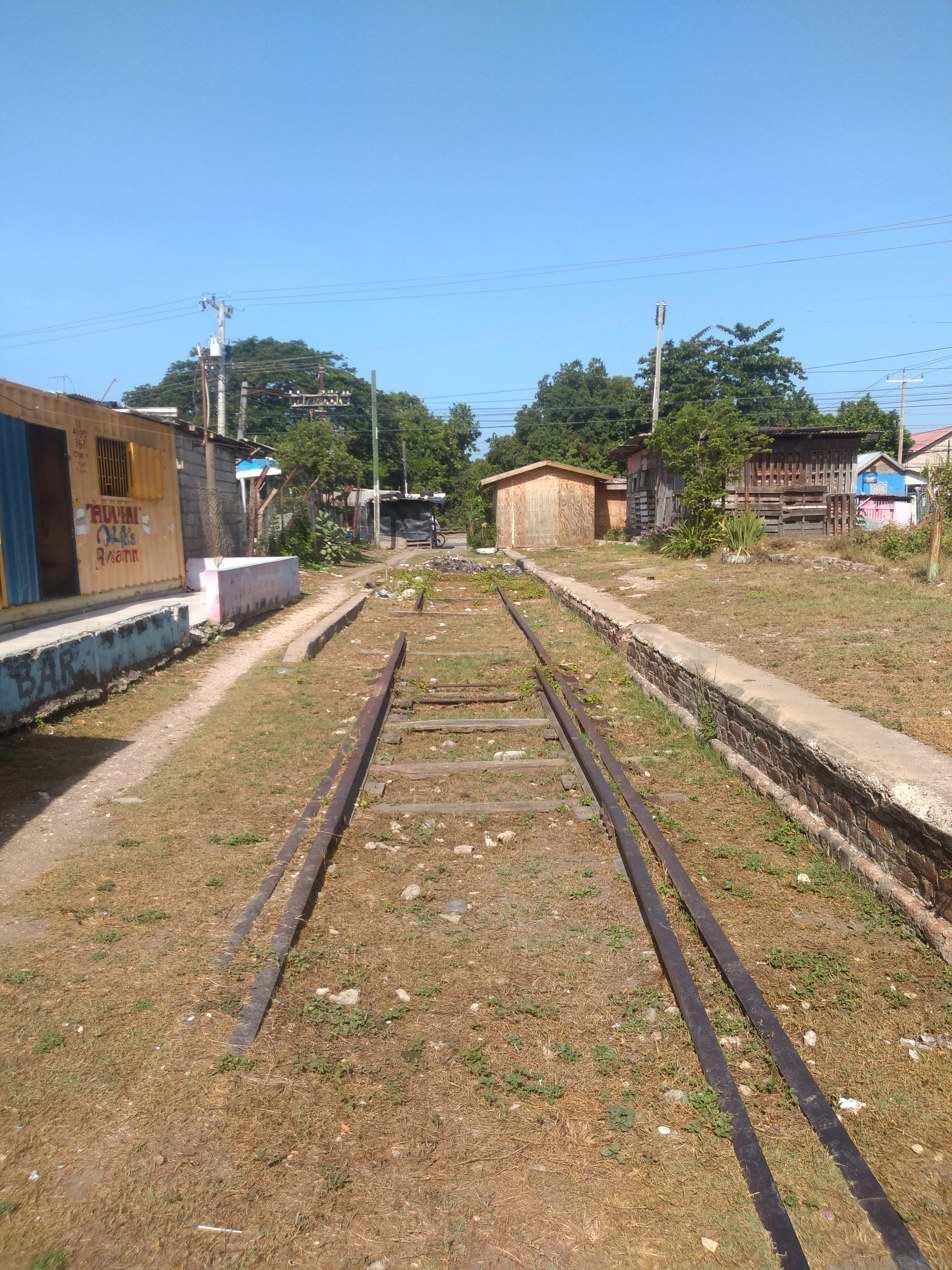
Railway looking back to Gregory Park Main Road, May 2021

Gregory Park railway station opened in 1845 and closed in 1992. It served the Gregory Park sugar estate on the Kingston to Montego Bay line, 6.5 miles (10.5 km) from the Kingston terminus. It was destroyed by fire sometime after closure.

The station was a two-story, timber building The ground floor had timber doors and sash windows. The upper floor was partially cantilevered using a series of angled timber arms to the upper front elevation to form a canopy over the platform with a veranda above. The roof of the building was a T-shaped gable end.

== Fares ==
In 1910 the third class fare from Gregory Park to Kingston was 6d (sixpence); first class was about double.

== See also ==
- Railway stations in Jamaica
