= Anchovy railway station =

Railway station in Jamaica

Anchovy

General information
- Coordinates: 18.407332°N 77.935622°W
- Owner: Jamaica Railway Corporation
- Line: Kingston to Montego Bay main line
- Platforms: Single
- Tracks: One

History
- Opened: 1894
- Closed: 1992-10
Location
- Location within Jamaica

Anchovy railway station opened in 1894 and closed in 1992. It served the small town of Anchovy, Jamaica on the Kingston to Montego Bay line and was 105.75 miles (170.19 km) from the Kingston terminus.

It was built around 1894 of timber in the Jamaican Georgian architectural style. It has two floors. The ground floor has timber doors and sash windows. The upper floor is partially cantilevered and is supported by a series of timber posts on the ground floor to form a canopy over the platform and front elevation. The upper floor has a mixture of sash and louvred windows as well as recessed panel timber doors. The roof of the structure is a T-shaped gable end zinc roof with a semi-circular fanlight on either side of a double gable end section of the roof.

In 2003 it was reported as being in "very poor condition" and "in need of major repairs".

It is on the list of designated National Heritage Sites in Jamaica.

== Fares ==
In 1910, the third class fare from Anchovy to Kingston was 8/- (eight shillings); first class was about double.

== See also ==
- Railway stations in Jamaica

External images
- Aerial view
- Facade
- Track side
