= List of railway stations in Jamaica =

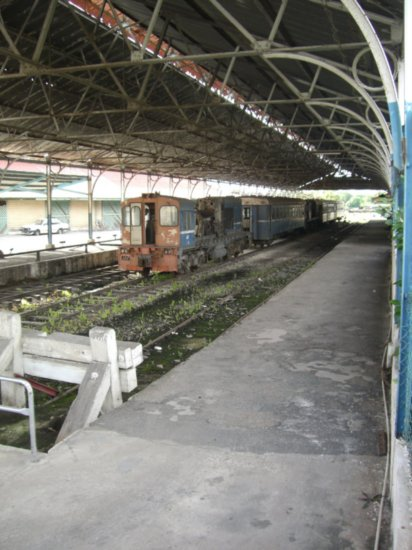
Looking out of Kingston railway terminus along the permanent way from near the buffers.

All railway stations in Jamaica closed in October 1992 when passenger traffic abruptly ceased. They are here listed by branch and distance from Kingston. In some cases, elevation (height above sea level) is also shown. The Jamaica Railway Corporation resumed operating passenger services in July 2011, before ending them again in August 2012 due to financial difficulties.

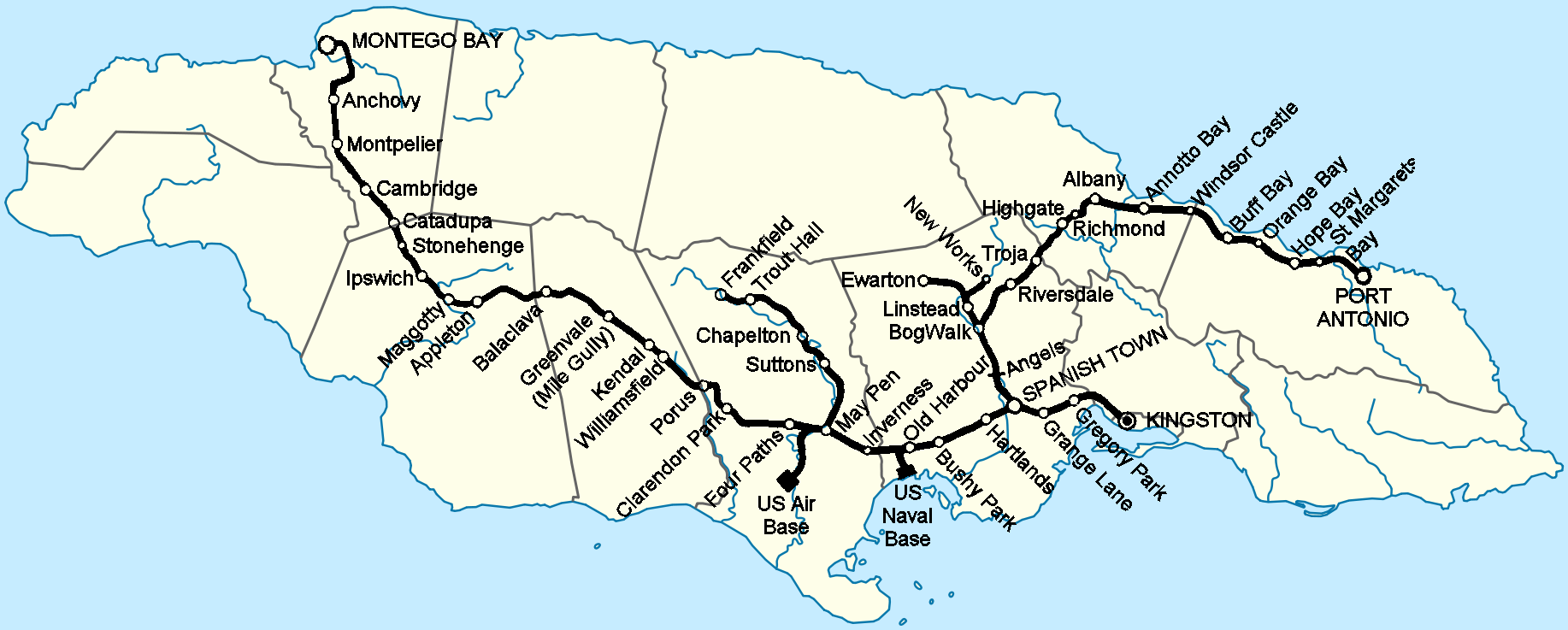
Map of the Jamaica railway system at its pre-bauxite peak c1945.

== Kingston to Montego Bay main line ==
There were 22 stations and 17 halts a halt being a flag stop.:

- Kingston railway station (53m) - Terminus and national capital
- Greenwich Town Halt
- Marcus Garvey Drive Halt
- Hunts Bay Halt
- Gregory Park railway station
- Grange Lane station
- Spanish Town railway station - Branch junction
- Horizon Park Halt
- Hartlands Halt
- Bushy Park Halt
- Old Harbour station formerly Whim Station
- May Pen Station - Branch junction
- Jacob's Hut
- Four Paths station
- Rock Halt
- Clarendon Park station
- Scott's Pass Halt
- Porus station
- Williamsfield station
- Grove Place Halt
- Kendal Station - accident September 1, 1957 175 killed and over 800 injured
- Greenvale station
- Comfort Hall Halt
- Duck Pond Halt
- Oxford Halt
- Balaclava railway station (382m) - accident July 30, 1938 32 killed and 70 injured
- Siloah Halt
- Appleton station
- Appleton Tourist Halt
- Maggotty station
- Ipswich station
- Breadnut Walk Halt
- Stonehenge station
- Catadupa station
- Cambridge station
- Montpelier railway station, Jamaica
- Anchovy railway station
- Ailford's Halt
- Gordon's Halt
- Montego Bay railway station (63m) - Terminus and second largest city

== Spanish Town to Ewarton branch line ==
There were 4 stations and 5 halts:

- Spanish Town railway station (Branch Junction)
- St. John's Road Halt
- Angels Halt
- Crescent Halt
- Bog Walk Station - Junction
- Michleton Halt
- Linstead Station (Branch junction)
- Sterling Castle Halt
- Ewarton Station (Terminus)

== Bog Walk to Port Antonio branch line ==
There were 13 stations and 15 halts:

- Bog Walk Station (Branch Junction)
- Crawle Halt formerly New Works
- Riversdale Station formerly Natural Bridge Station
- Harewood Halt
- Darling Spring Halt
- Troja Station
- Troja Halt
- Richmond Station
- Highgate Station formerly Orange River Station
- Baughs Halt
- Esher Station
- Albany Station formerly Moore Hall Station
- Belfield Halt
- Grays Inn Halt
- Fort George Halt
- Annotto Bay Station
- Fort Stewart Halt
- Windsor Castle Halt
- Buff Bay Station
- Spring Garden Halt
- Orange Bay Station
- Hope Bay Station
- Robertson's Halt
- Saint Margaret's Bay Station
- Snow Hill Halt
- Passley Gardens Halt
- Norwich Halt
- Fuschia
- Port Antonio Station (Terminus)

== Linstead to New Works branch line ==
There must have been at least 2 stations on this three mile branch line:

- Linstead Station (Branch Junction)
- New Works Station (Terminus)

== May Pen to Frankfield branch line ==
There were 10 stations and halts on the line c1973. More recent references mention only nine. The line closed in 1974.

- May Pen Station - Branch junction
- Longville Halt
- Suttons Station
- Cross Roads/Ivy Store Station
- Chapelton Station
- Danks Station
- Morgans Station
- Bryan's Hill Station extant 1973, unmentioned 2005.
- Crooked River Station
- Trout Hall Station
- Frankfield railway station (276m) - Terminus

== Strays ==
- Bernard Lodge which is a sugar estate south east of Spanish Town. Satellite images show what appears to be an abandoned line heading in this direction from Spanish Town station but no other references to it have been found.

== See also ==
- List of railway tunnels in Jamaica
