= Stonehenge (disambiguation) =

Stonehenge is an ancient stone monument in Salisbury Plain, Wiltshire, England.

Stonehenge may also refer to:

== Places ==
=== Australia ===
- Stonehenge, New South Wales, a rural locality in Australia
- Stonehenge, Queensland (Barcoo Shire), a small outback township in Australia
- Stonehenge, Queensland (Toowoomba Region), a small township on the Darling Downs in Australia
- Stonehenge, Tasmania, a rural locality in Australia

=== United States ===
- Stonehenge (building), an apartment building in North Bergen, New Jersey
- Stonehenge (Dublin, New Hampshire), a summer estate house
- America's Stonehenge, an archaeological site in New Hampshire
- Maryhill Stonehenge, a replica in Maryhill, Washington
- Stonehenge Tower, a radio antenna tower in Portland, Oregon

=== Elsewhere ===
- Stonehenge, Jamaica, a town in Jamaica
- Amazon Stonehenge, an archaeological site in northern Brazil
- Rural Municipality of Stonehenge No. 73, Saskatchewan, Canada

== Arts, entertainment, and media ==
=== Music ===
- Stonehenge (Richie Havens album), 1970
- Stonehenge (Ruins album), 1990
- "Stonehenge", a song from the soundtrack for This Is Spinal Tap
- "Stonehenge", a song on Brazilian band Fresno's album Quarto dos Livros
- "Stonehenge", a song by Norway's comedy duo Ylvis

=== Other uses in arts, entertainment, and media ===
- Stonehenge (game), an anthology board game
- Stonehenge (novel), a 1999 novel by Bernard Cornwell
- Stonehenge, a superweapon in Ace Combat 04, Ace Combat Infinity, and Ace Combat 7
- Stonehenge Free Festival, a former British free festival

== Other uses ==
- Stonehenge, the pen name of the English sports and canine writer John Henry Walsh
- HMS Stonehenge (P232), an S class submarine of the Royal Navy
- Stonehenge Stakes, a horse race run at Salisbury Racecourse, England

== See also ==
- Carhenge, a replica of Stonehenge built in 1987 from vintage automobiles
- Henge, a term for certain prehistoric architectural structures
