= Montego Bay =

Montego Bay Mobay/Muhbay
- City
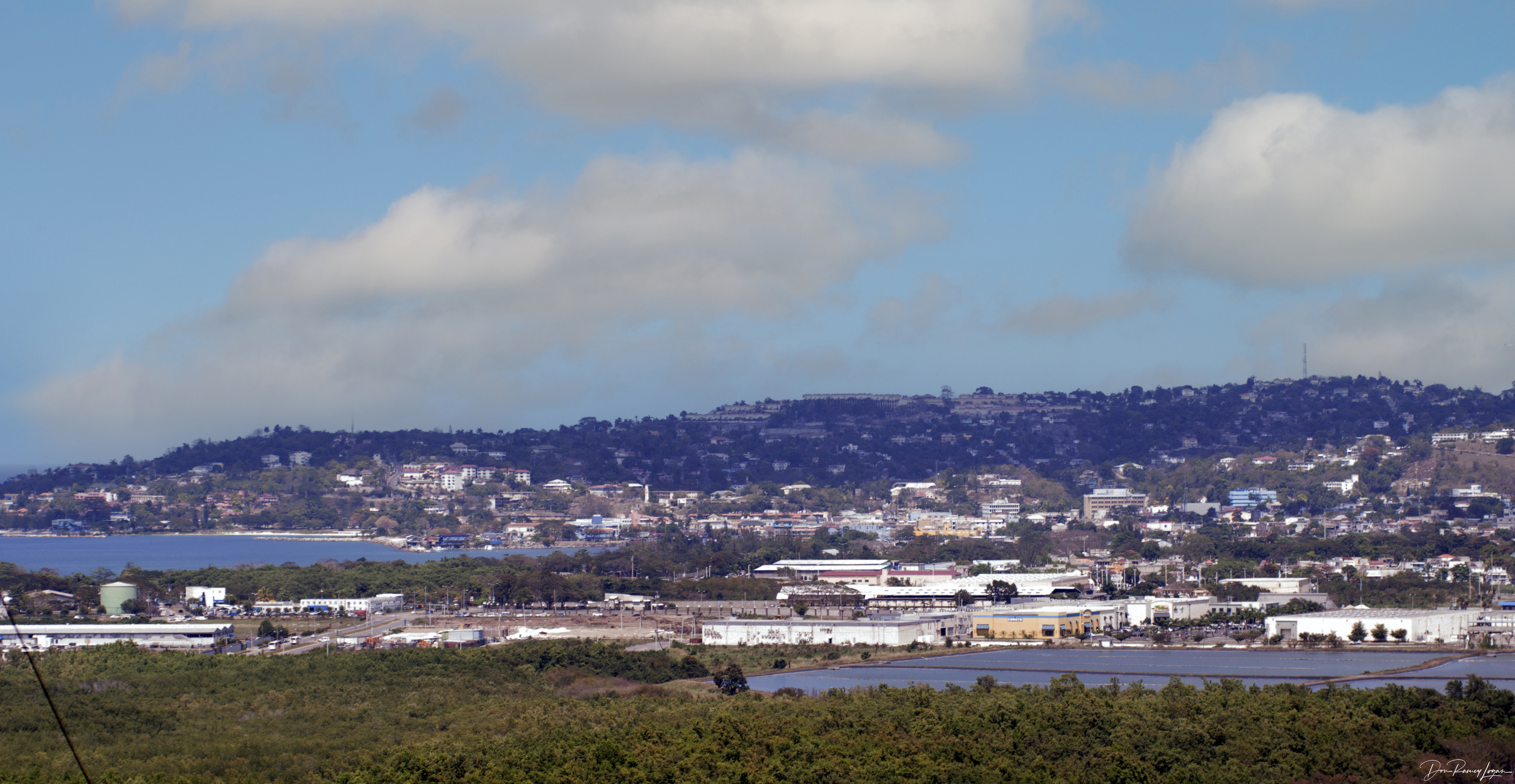
- View of Montego Bay from the hillside
- Nicknames: "MoBay/Muhbay", "The Second City"
- Location within Jamaica
- Coordinates: 18°28′N 77°55′W
- Country: Jamaica
- County: Cornwall
- Parish: St. James
- Proclaimed city by act of Parliament: 1980

Government
  - Mayor: Richard Vernon

Population (2011)
  - Total: 110,115
  - St. James: 175,127
- Time zone: UTC−5 (EST)
- Area codes: +1-876 +1-658 (Overlay of 876; active as of November 2018)

Montego Bay (Jamaican Patois: Mobay or Muhbay) is the capital of the parish of St. James in Jamaica. The city is the fourth most populous urban area in the country, after Kingston, Spanish Town, and Portmore, which form the Greater Kingston Metropolitan Area, home to more than half a million people. As a result, Montego Bay is the second-largest anglophone city in the Caribbean, after Kingston.

Montego Bay is a popular tourist destination featuring duty-free shopping, a cruise line terminal and several beaches and resorts. The city is served by the Donald Sangster International Airport, the busiest airport in the Anglophone Caribbean, which is located within the official city limits. The city is enclosed in a watershed, drained by several rivers such as the Montego River. Montego Bay is referred to as "The Second City", "MoBay" or "Bay".

== Toponymy ==
Christopher Columbus named the bay of Montego, Golfo de Buen Tiempo ("Fair Weather Gulf"). The name "Montego Bay" is believed to have originated as a corruption of the Spanish word manteca ("lard"), allegedly because during the Spanish period it was the port where lard, leather and beef were exported.

== History ==
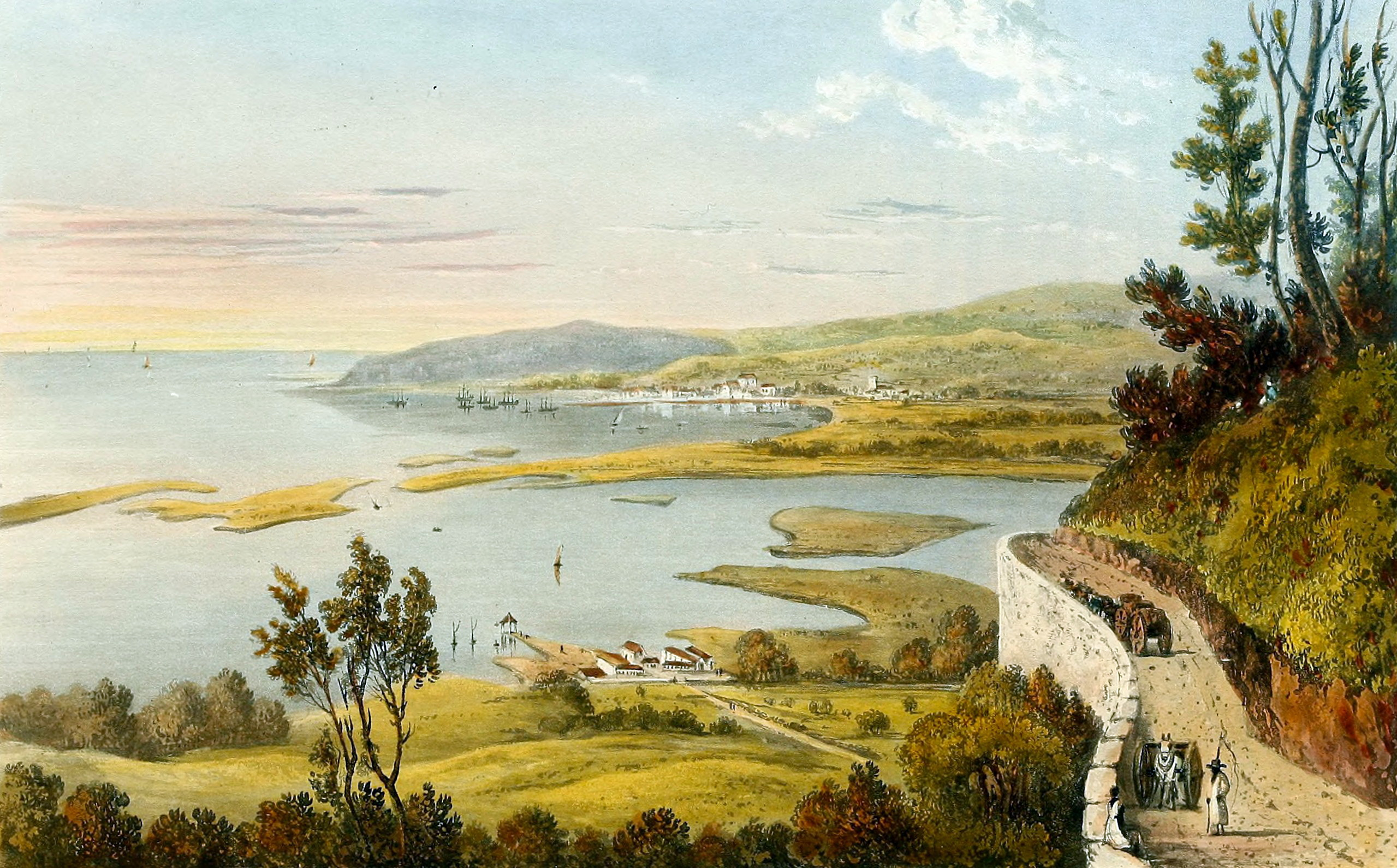
Montego Bay, c. 1820

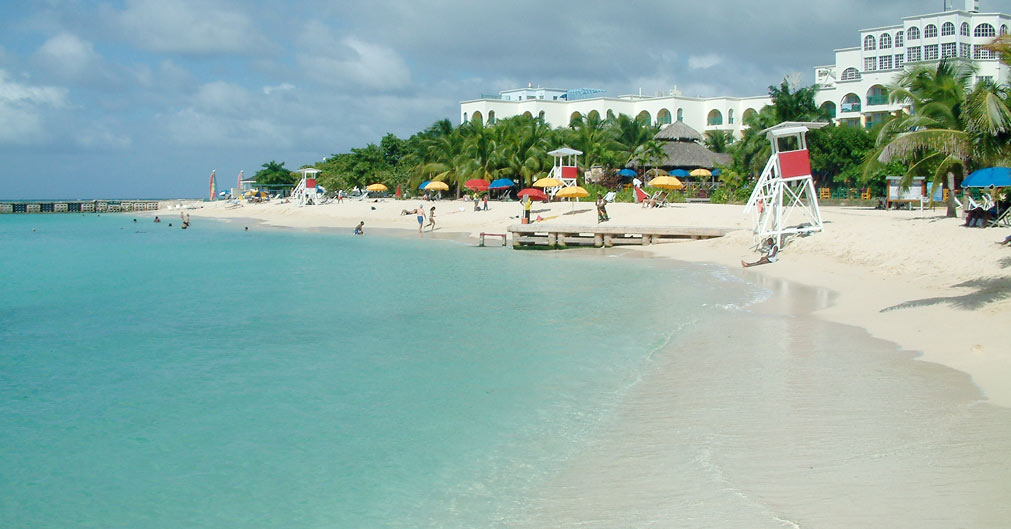
Doctor's Cave Beach Club

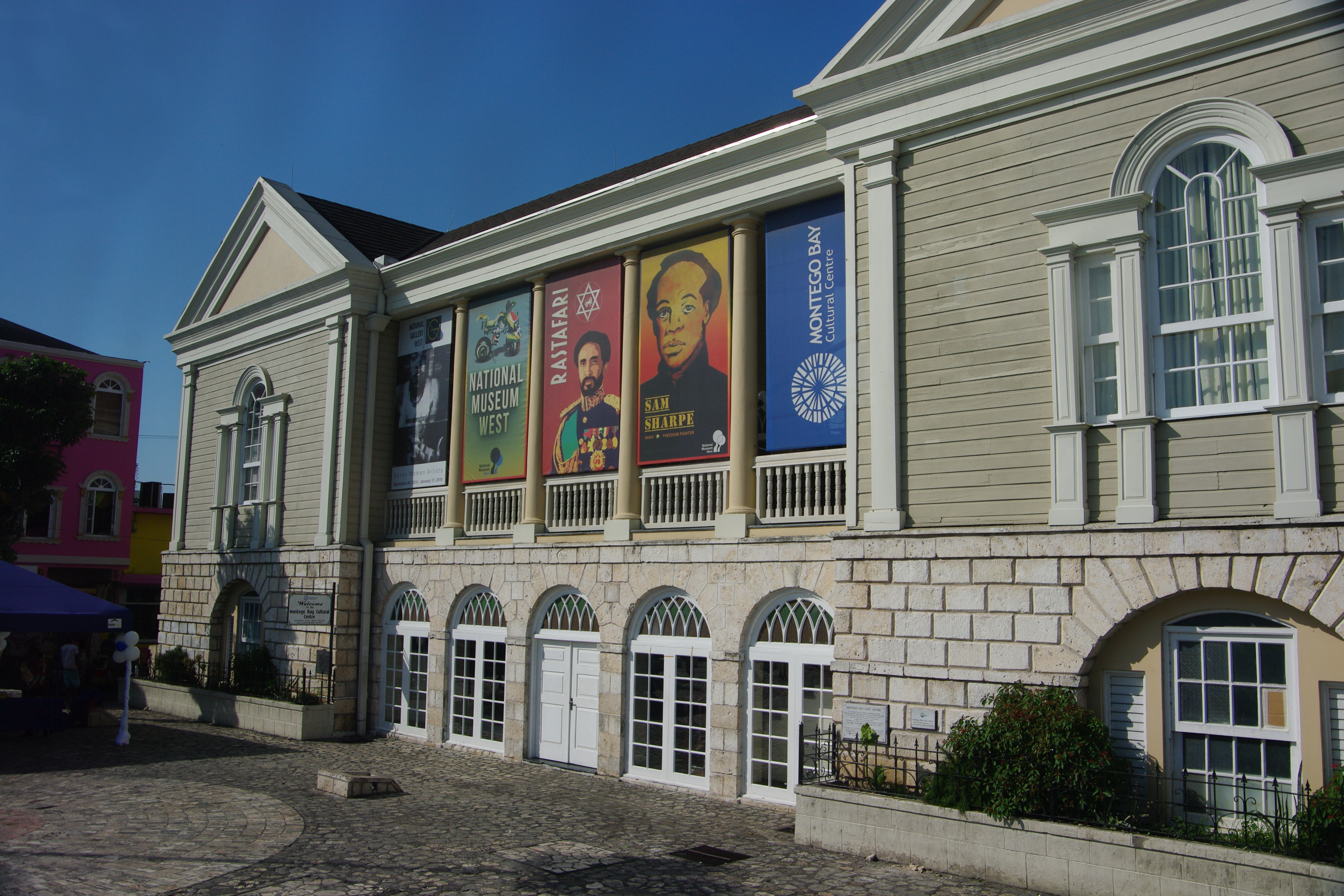
The Montego Bay Cultural Centre. The building was formerly a ballroom and courthouse during the height of the country's colonial period. It is also home to the National Gallery of Jamaica West.

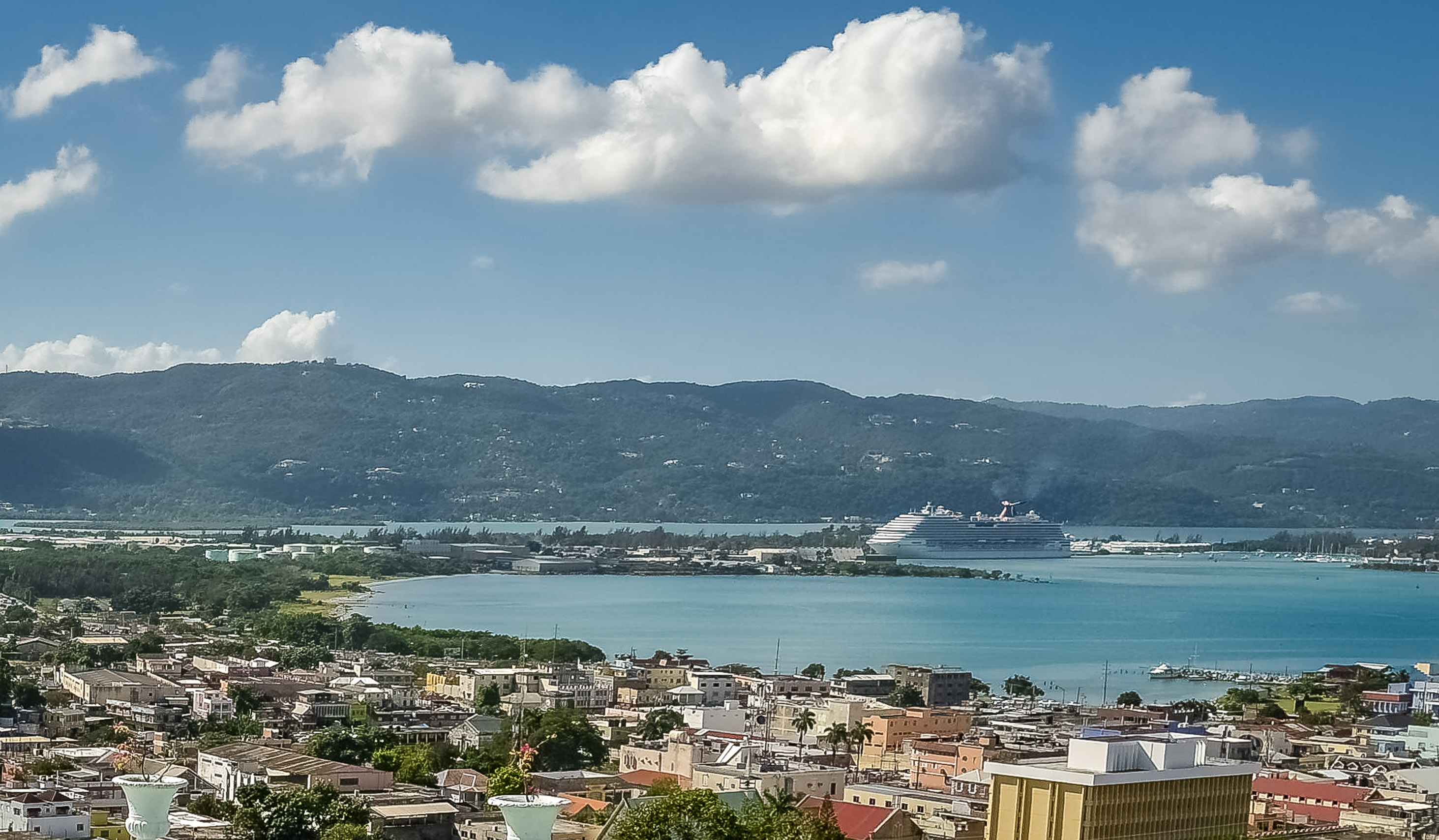
Cruise ship at Montego Bay

The Arawak tribe of South America are Jamaica's first known inhabitants and were there to greet Columbus when he ventured to the island in 1494. Jamaica was a colony of Spain from 1511 until 1655, when Oliver Cromwell's Caribbean expedition, the Western Design, drove the Spanish from the island. After the British removed the Spanish rule, along with the majority of all buildings and infrastructure, the colonials established the parish of St. James which directly influenced the area in becoming a huge contributor of sugar cane. In fact, during this period of British governing, Montego Bay was the largest producer of sugar cane on the island of Jamaica, giving the region more value than originally anticipated.

Throughout the duration of slavery, from the mid-17th century until 1834, and well into the 20th century, the town of Montego Bay functioned primarily as a sugarcane port. The island's last major slave revolt, the Christmas Rebellion or Baptist War (1831–1832) took place in and around the area of Montego Bay. The rebellion set estates and plantations to flame and was the start of a broader political push toward emancipation. Retribution was quickly sought by British leaders and many were hanged for their attempts at revolt; the leader of the revolt, Samuel Sharpe, was hanged there in 1832. Recognition was later given, and Sharpe was proclaimed a national hero of Jamaica in 1975, and the main square of the town was renamed in his honor.

Eventually, Jamaica was emancipated on August 1, 1834 which granted all new children born or children under the age of six "free" status, but held individuals outside of that parameter to be apprentices and work forty hours a week in compensation to their previous or original owners. It was not until four years after these restrictions were put in place that all slave and apprentices were given the status of full freedom. After the half decade emancipation process, Montego Bay and its sugarcane industry took a hit. Therefore, it branched out and took root in expanding into exporting bananas and coffee as well.

Montego Bay's city status prior to British rule was debated; however, it had its city status revoked during Jamaica's British colonial period. It was re-proclaimed a city by act of parliament in 1980, but this has not meant that it has acquired any form of autonomy, for it continues to be an integral part of the parish of St. James.

Today, Montego Bay is known for Cornwall Regional Hospital, port facilities, second homes for numerous upper-class Jamaicans from Kingston as well as North Americans and Europeans, fine restaurants, vibrant night life and shopping. The coastland near Montego Bay is occupied by numerous tourist resorts, most newly built, some occupying the grounds of old sugarcane plantations with some of the original buildings and mill-works still standing. The most famous is the White Witch's Rose Hall which features a world-class golf course.

The infrastructure of the city is going through a series of modernizations which once completed, aims to keep Montego Bay as a top destination in the region. The Montego Bay Convention Centre, built on a large site near to the Rose Hall estate, was opened by Jamaican Prime Minister Bruce Golding on 7 January 2011.

In October 2025, Montego Bay was heavily affected by Hurricane Melissa.

== Geography ==
Montego Bay is located on the northwest coast of Jamaica in the parish of St. James, roughly ninety minutes west of Kingston. A broad valley comes down to the Caribbean Sea from the Bogue, Kempshot and Salem limestone hills. The coastal plain is narrow as the descent from the hills is quite steep.

There are white sand beaches on the eastern side of the bay with outlying coral reefs to the north and south of the bay. Mangrove swamps have formed on the coast where protected by the coral reefs. Part of the bay, almost sixteen square kilometers, including Bogue Island has been set aside as the Montego Bay Marine Park. Montego Bay Point is the cape forming the northern boundary of the bay, it is located just southwest of the airport.

The climate is tropical with little temperature variation, averaging 23.7°C (74.7°F) to 29.8°C (85.6°F). Rainfall is seasonal, most precipitation occurs between October to December and mid April through mid June. However, thunderstorms bring short but occasionally severe rains during the summer months from June to September. Hurricanes are also possible during the summer months.

Highway A1 (the North Coast Highway) is the main thoroughfare.

== Demographics ==
The majority of the city's population is of African descent. The city is also home to sizeable minority ethnic groups such as the East Indians and Chinese, who came to the country as indentured servants in the mid-to-late 19th century. The Chinese especially occupy important roles in the city's economy especially in retail where Downtown Montego Bay is home to many shops and supermarkets owned by Chinese immigrants. The city's East Indian population also play a key role as they operate many gift and jewelry shops in the city which are mostly geared to tourists.

There is a minority of Europeans, some descending from immigrants from Germany (the city is a 90-minute drive from German settlements such as German Town in Westmoreland) and Great Britain (who own most of the land in the city from as far back as the days of the slave trade). The city is home to many immigrants from Hispanic countries such as Mexico, Cuba and Spain as well as many French, Russians and Italians (who mostly own homes or beachfront properties in the area). The city also is home to many Americans and Canadians, who work the tourism or business process outsourcing (BPO) industries.

== Religion ==
There are a wide variety of Christian churches in the city. Most are Protestant, a legacy of British colonisation of the island. The chief denominations are Church of God, Baptist, Anglican, Methodist, Roman Catholic, Seventh-day Adventist and Pentecostal. Afro-Christian syncretic religions such as the Rastafari movement also have a significant following. The city also has a unit of the Church of Jesus Christ of Latter-day Saints.

The city also has communities of Buddhists, Hindus, and Muslims.

== Economy ==
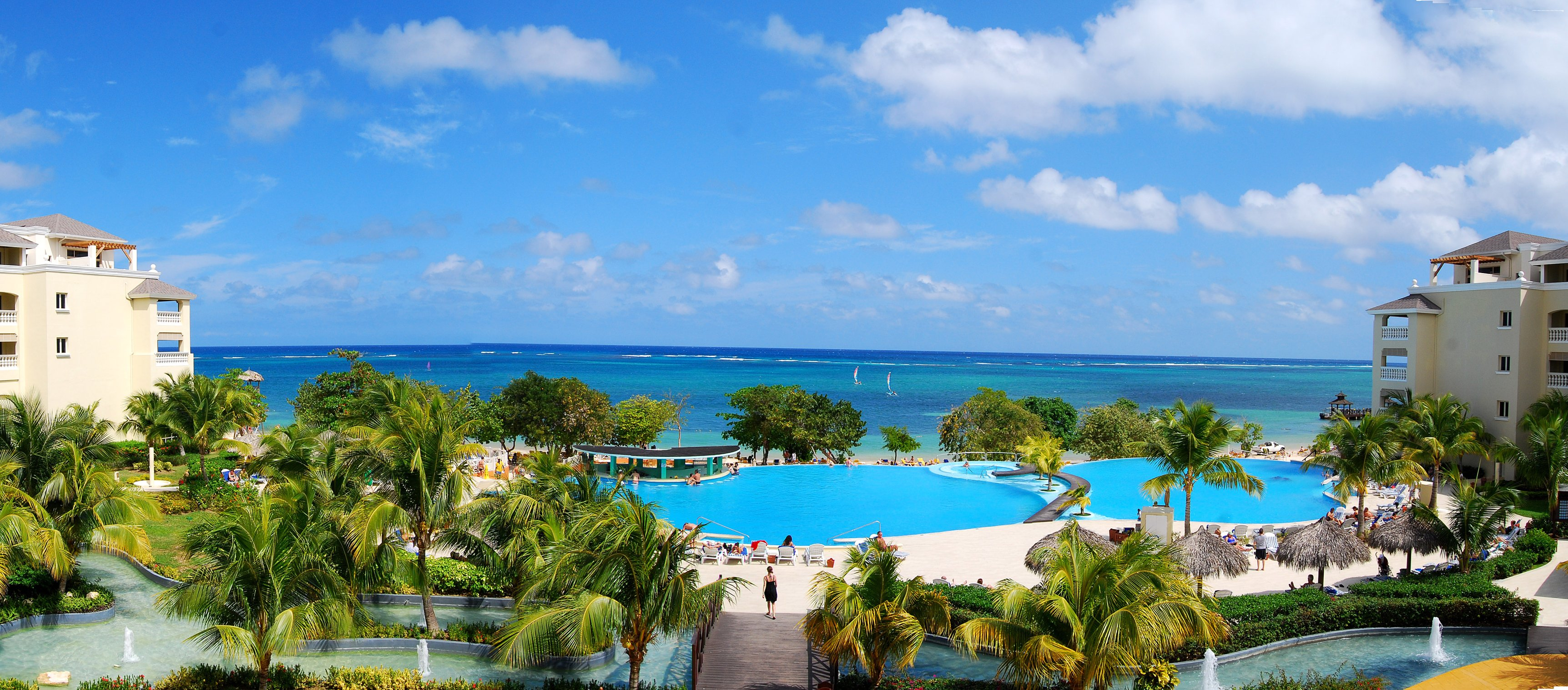
View of the Caribbean Sea from the Iberostar Hotel and Resort

Montego Bay is pivotal to Jamaica's economy. The city holds most of the weight of the country's tourism sector. Most of the country's visitors arrive and depart from Montego Bay's airport or port. Many international companies have resorts in the city including Hyatt, Hilton Hotels, Holiday Inn, RIU Hotels, Royalton and Iberostar. The city is the home to the headquarters of international resort chain Sandals. The Government of Jamaica, through the Ministry of Tourism, has begun to focus on bolstering the city's entertainment and gastronomic offerings. Though the city's airport hosts a number international chains, the city itself does not have access to these restaurants. The city has become home to Usain Bolt's Tracks and Records restaurant. The city also serves as the Head Office for Starbucks' operations in Jamaica.

== Institutions ==
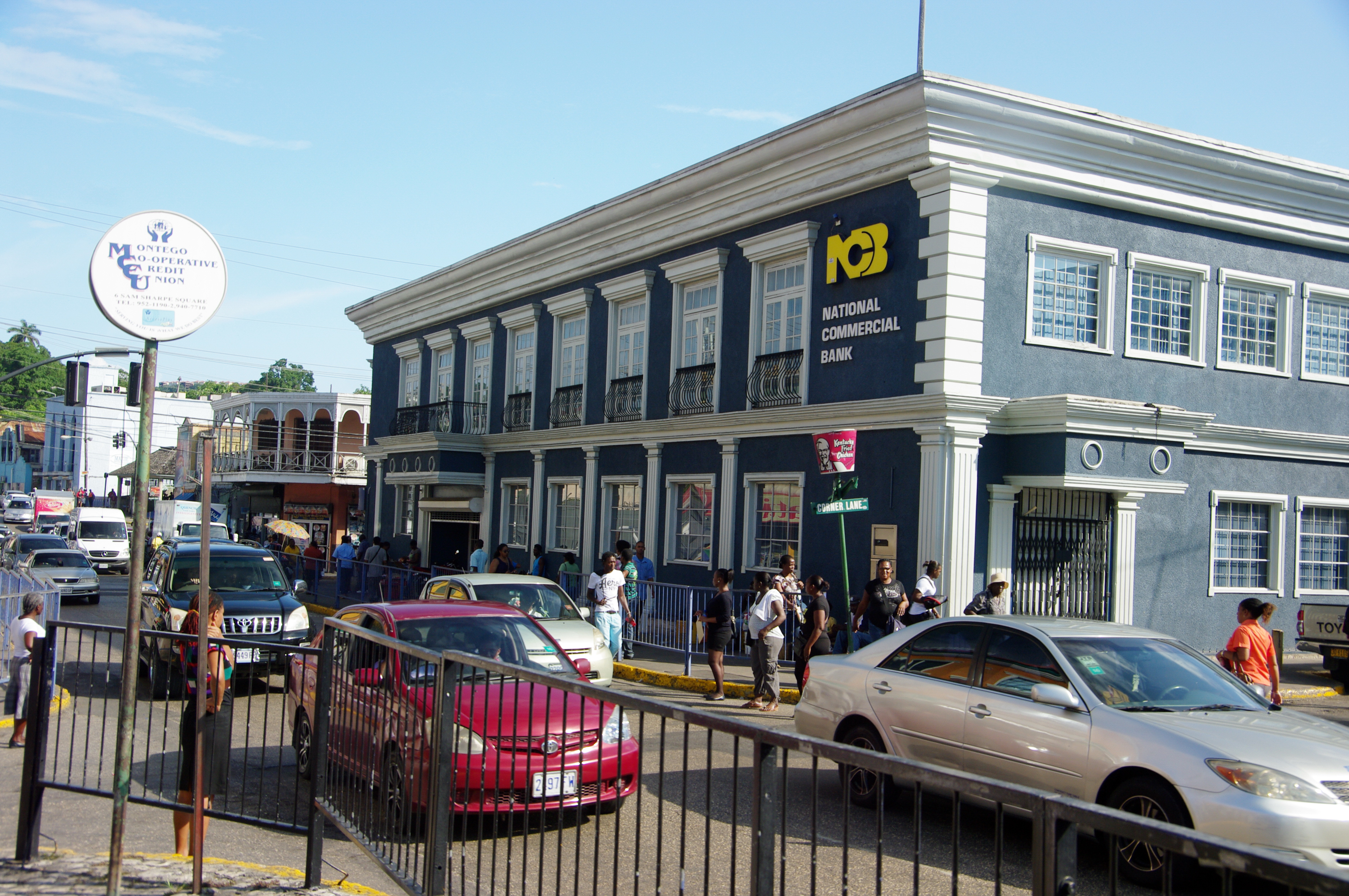
National Commercial Bank's branch in Sam Sharpe Square, bordered by Union Street, St. James Street, and Corner Lane.

The city hosts financial institutions such as Scotiabank, FCIB, National Commercial Bank, Jamaica National Commercial Bank (JN Bank) and many others. The city also has offices for many auditing firms such as KPMG and PwC.

Health institutions in the city include the Cornwall Regional Hospital as well as the Hospiten, a Spanish-owned, private hospital located in Rose Hall.

Education in the city can be found from Pre-K up to Tertiary. The city has many Pre-K and Basic Schools. Beyond this, the city has many Primary and Preparatory Schools. Secondary Education is also provided in the city, most notable institutions being the Montego Bay High School for Girls, Mount Alvernia High School—a Roman Catholic High School for Girls which shares the same crest, motto and wears a uniform similar to that of sister school of Immaculate Conception High School in Kingston, Herbert Morrison Technical High School and the oldest school in the city, Cornwall College, an all-boys' school.

Tertiary institutions in the city are the University of West Indies (UWI) – Western Jamaica Campus, the University of Technology (UTECH) Montego Bay Campus, Sam Sharpe Teachers' College (SSTC) and the Montego Bay Community College (MBCC). Most tertiary institutions in the city are accredited.

== Transport ==
=== Roads ===
The North Coast Highway runs through the city of Montego Bay, with 2 lanes in each direction within the city, terminating at the Queen's Drive and resuming at the intersection of the Alice Eldemire Drive and Barnett Street. The North Coast Highway connects Montego Bay with the North-South section of Highway 2000 (called T3), which begins at Mammee Bay in Ocho Rios, St. Ann and terminates at an interchange which leads onto the Mandela Highway in St. Catherine and into the nation's capital, Kingston.

Another major road within the city is the B15 (Montego Bay to Falmouth) road. The city is also well served by buses, mini-busses and taxis, which operate from the Montego Bay Transport Centre.

The Government of Jamaica announced that a tolled bypass to the city has been planned to be built in order to reduce traffic congestion and travel times. The bypass is to begin at Westgate and end at Ironshore. The bypass is expected to cost around US$200 million.

=== Rail ===
The now disused Montego Bay railway station served the Kingston to Montego Bay main line. The railway station opened c. 1894, and closed in October 1992 when all passenger traffic on Jamaica's railways abruptly ceased.

=== Air ===
Montego Bay is served by Jamaica's largest airport, the Sangster International Airport. The airport has the distinction of being the busiest airport in the English-speaking Caribbean, serving 4.3 million passengers in 2017.

The airport was the hub of Jamaica's former national airline Air Jamaica. The airline also had its reservations, Western Jamaica sales & ticketing office, as well as its vacations division in the city until its purchase by Caribbean Airlines in 2011, when they moved their offices to Kingston. The site is now the headquarters for Island Routes, a company owned by the Sandals-ATL Group, which in the past was affiliated with the airline.

The airport is served by several North American and European airlines, connecting the island with the United States, the United Kingdom, Europe and South America. The southern U.S. city of Miami can be reached within 70 minutes. The southern U.S. cities of Charlotte, Houston, Atlanta and Tampa can be reached by non-stop flights in less than three hours. Other locations like Philadelphia, New York City, Toronto, Washington, D.C., and Montreal can be reached in under four hours. The airport has undergone major expansion since 2003, and has won awards including the coveted World Travel Award for being the Caribbean's Leading Airport, beating airports like Punta Cana International Airport and Grantley Adams International Airport.

=== Port ===
There is a free port and cruise line terminal on a man-made peninsula jutting into the bay.

== In popular culture ==
The city was the subject of a namesake song by Bobby Bloom in 1970, which became a Top Ten hit in the United States. It was later covered by Jon Stevens in 1980 and by Amazulu in 1986, becoming minor hits for both. Several scenes from the 1973 James Bond film Live and Let Die (in which Roger Moore appeared as Bond for the first time) were filmed around Montego Bay. Montego Bay was featured in the song Santechnikas iš Ukmergės by Lithuanian singer Vytautas Kernagis. The NBC TV Series Manifest revolves around passengers who were aboard Montego Air 828 — a fictional flight traveling from Montego Bay to New York City.

== Climate ==
Montego Bay has a tropical monsoon climate (Köppen climate classification Am), with a wet season and a drier season and the temperature being warm or hot year-round. The average annual high temperature is 31.7 °C (89.1 °F), while the average annual low temperature is 23.7 °C (74.7 °F). The hottest time of year is from June to September. August has the highest average high at 33.4 °C (92.1 °F). July and August have the highest average low at 24.9 °C (76.8 °F). January and February have the lowest average high at 29.8 °C (85.6 °F). February has the lowest average low at 22.1 °C (71.8 °F).

Montego Bay receives 1,136 millimetres (44.7 in) of rain over 127 precipitation days, with wetter and drier months. The dry season is fairly short, lasting from January to April. July also sees a dip in precipitation. October, the wettest month, receives 158 millimetres (6.2 in) of rainfall over 14 precipitation days on average. Humidity remains consistently high year-round. Montego Bay receives 2954 hours of sunshine annually (7.6 hours per day) on average, with the sunshine being distributed fairly evenly across the year. In October of 2025 the city was affected by Hurricane Melissa.

Climate data for Montego Bay (1991-2020)
Month	Jan	Feb	Mar	Apr	May	Jun	Jul	Aug	Sep	Oct	Nov	Dec	Year
Record high °C (°F)	32.8 (91.0)	33.3 (91.9)	34.2 (93.6)	37.8 (100.0)	38.9 (102.0)	37.8 (100.0)	35.6 (96.1)	36.1 (97.0)	36.2 (97.2)	35.0 (95.0)	34.7 (94.5)	32.5 (90.5)	38.9 (102.0)
Mean daily maximum °C (°F)	29.8 (85.6)	30.0 (86.0)	30.5 (86.9)	31.4 (88.5)	32.0 (89.6)	33.0 (91.4)	33.3 (91.9)	33.4 (92.1)	33.0 (91.4)	32.2 (90.0)	31.1 (88.0)	30.2 (86.4)	31.7 (89.1)
Daily mean °C (°F)	26.0 (78.8)	26.0 (78.8)	26.5 (79.7)	27.5 (81.5)	28.0 (82.4)	28.8 (83.8)	29.1 (84.4)	29.2 (84.6)	28.8 (83.8)	28.3 (82.9)	27.6 (81.7)	26.6 (79.9)	27.7 (81.9)
Mean daily minimum °C (°F)	22.2 (72.0)	22.1 (71.8)	22.5 (72.5)	23.5 (74.3)	24.0 (75.2)	24.6 (76.3)	24.9 (76.8)	24.9 (76.8)	24.6 (76.3)	24.3 (75.7)	23.9 (75.0)	23.0 (73.4)	23.7 (74.7)
Record low °C (°F)	13.3 (55.9)	12.8 (55.0)	14.7 (58.5)	15.3 (59.5)	19.2 (66.6)	19.4 (66.9)	18.3 (64.9)	19.7 (67.5)	20.0 (68.0)	17.2 (63.0)	18.3 (64.9)	16.4 (61.5)	12.8 (55.0)
Average precipitation mm (inches)	76.6 (3.02)	41.8 (1.65)	59.0 (2.32)	63.8 (2.51)	150.3 (5.92)	86.1 (3.39)	66.4 (2.61)	93.9 (3.70)	135.4 (5.33)	158.5 (6.24)	106.9 (4.21)	81.4 (3.20)	1,135.9 (44.72)
Average precipitation days (≥ 1.0 mm)	11	9	7	7	12	11	8	10	14	14	13	11	127
Average relative humidity (%)	77	76	75	74	76	78	76	77	78	79	79	78	77
Mean monthly sunshine hours	239.1	239.6	270.0	274.7	254.2	246.2	271.9	251.3	223.3	226.6	229.5	228.1	2,954.2
Mean daily sunshine hours	7.4	7.7	8.1	8.4	8.1	7.9	8.2	7.7	7.0	7.0	7.1	7.0	7.6
Source 1: NOAA
Source 2: Deutscher Wetterdienst (extremes, precipitation days, humidity, daily sun 1961-1990)

== Notable people ==
- Jimmy Cliff, Musician & singer
- Delroy Allen, American soccer player
- Corey Ballentine, football cornerback and kick returner for the Atlanta Falcons
- Steve Bucknor, Test cricket umpire
- Violet Brown, Jamaican supercentenarian
- Ian Goodison, Jamaican footballer
- Richard Hart, Jamaican politician
- Richard Hill, lawyer and abolitionist
- Donovan Ricketts, Jamaican footballer
- Musashi Suzuki, Japanese footballer
- Ruby Turner, singer and actress
- Nicholas Walters, professional boxer

== See also ==
- List of cities in the Caribbean
- Railway stations in Jamaica
