= List of railway tunnels in Jamaica =

A list of railway tunnels in Jamaica.

== Kingston to Montego Bay ==
No.	Name	Distance from Kingston	Length	Coordinates
1	Scotts Pass 1	44.25 miles (71.21 km)	70 feet (21 m)	18.010252°N 77.385196°W
2	Scotts Pass 2	44.50 miles (71.62 km)	170 feet (52 m)	18.013399°N 77.387305°W
3	Comfort Hall	65.50 miles (105.41 km)	688 feet (210 m)	18.175264°N 77.591796°W
4	Balaclava	70.00 miles (112.65 km)	348 feet (106 m)	18.177075°N 77.639635°W
5	Highworth	84.00 miles (135.18 km)	182 feet (55 m)	18.182062°N 77.809706°W
6	Y S	84.50 miles (135.99 km)	218 feet (66 m)	18.191643°N 77.812228°W
7	Ipswich	86.25 miles (138.81 km)	855 feet (261 m)	18.198366°N 77.829713°W
8	Unnamed	87.75 miles (141.22 km)	555 feet (169 m)	18.210645°N 77.845387°W
9	Merrywood	88.50 miles (142.43 km)	362 feet (110 m)	18.217829°N 77.849420°W
10	Anchovy	104.50 miles (168.18 km)	102 feet (31 m)	18.391749°N 77.937486°W
11	Ramble	108.00 miles (173.81 km)	182 feet (55 m)	18.433805°N 77.947078°W
12	Bogue Hill 1	108.50 miles (174.61 km)	1,276 feet (389 m)	18.433324°N 77.942166°W
13	Bogue Hill 2	108.75 miles (175.02 km)	458 feet (140 m)	18.435868°N 77.938519°W

== Spanish Town to Port Antonio ==
No.	Name	Distance from Kingston	Length	Coordinates
1		16.75 miles (26.96 km)	305 feet (93 m)	18.054227°N 76.986043°W
2	Reeds Mountain	17.75 miles (28.57 km)	460 feet (140 m)	18.068823°N 76.992270°W
3		18.50 miles (29.77 km)	255 feet (78 m)	18.076151°N 76.994705°W
4		19.50 miles (31.38 km)	2,194 feet (669 m)	18.088061°N 77.004433°W
5		27.50 miles (44.26 km)	175 feet (53 m)	18.169957°N 76.954105°W
6		29.00 miles (46.67 km)	247 feet (75 m)	18.184486°N 76.942692°W
7		29.25 miles (47.07 km)	225 feet (69 m)	
8		30.25 miles (48.68 km)	156 feet (48 m)	
9		31.50 miles (50.69 km)	152 feet (46 m)	
10		31.75 miles (51.10 km)	152 feet (46 m)	
11		32.00 miles (51.50 km)	215 feet (66 m)	
12		32.00 miles (51.50 km)	232 feet (71 m)	
13		32.25 miles (51.90 km)	467 feet (142 m)	
14		32.50 miles (52.30 km)	232 feet (71 m)	
15		32.75 miles (52.71 km)	1,012 feet (308 m)	
16		33.00 miles (53.11 km)	317 feet (97 m)	
17	Barracks River	33.50 miles (53.91 km)	362 feet (110 m)	
18	Barracks River	34.25 miles (55.12 km)	248 feet (76 m)	
19	Flint River	34.50 miles (55.52 km)	192 feet (59 m)	
20	Zion Hill	35.50 miles (57.13 km)	492 feet (150 m)	
21	Highgate	38.00 miles (61.16 km)	208 feet (63 m)	
22	Buff Bay	59.25 miles (95.35 km)	374 feet (114 m)	
23	Rodney's Hall	62.75 miles (100.99 km)	342 feet (104 m)	
24	Rocky Hill	64.00 miles (103.00 km)	639 feet (195 m)	
25	Whitby	64.25 miles (103.40 km)	252 feet (77 m)	
26	Sand Shore	64.75 miles (104.21 km)	265 feet (81 m)	
27	Paisley Garden	72.00 miles (115.87 km)	288 feet (88 m)	
28	Norwich	72.50 miles (116.68 km)	151 feet (46 m)	

== May Pen to Frankfield ==
No.	Name	Distance from May Pen	Length	Coordinates
1	Ivy Store	11.50 miles (18.51 km)	100 feet (30 m)	18.077101°N 77.265232°W
2	Crooked River	18.50 miles (29.77 km)	252 feet (77 m)	18.136602°N 77.309992°W

== Bog Walk to Ewarton ==
None.

== See also ==
- Kingston to Montego Bay line
- Spanish Town to Ewarton line
- Bog Walk to Port Antonio line
- May Pen to Frankfield line
