= H. R. Fox =

- Born: Harold Robert Leslie Fox; 17 November 1889; May Pen, Clarendon, Jamaica
- Died: 14 August 1951 (aged 61); Mandeville, Jamaica
- Education: Epsom College
- Alma mater: MIT (BSc, 1912)
- Occupation: Civil engineer
- Employer: Jamaica Government Railway
- Known for: General Manager of the Jamaica Government Railway at its centenary in 1945

Harold Robert Leslie Fox CBE (17 November 1889 – 14 August 1951) was a British civil engineer who was General Manager of the Jamaica Government Railway at the time of its centenary in 1945.

Fox was the son of Edith Blount Gibb and Isaac Fox of Halse Hall, Jamaica. He went to school at Epsom College in England then studied Mining and Civil Engineering at MIT, graduating BSc in 1912. After graduating he worked on railways in Canada and the West Indies. He served in the First World War in France with the Royal Engineers reaching the rank of captain.

Fox was a member of the Institution of Civil Engineers. He was appointed Commander of the Order of the British Empire (CBE) in the 1946 New Year Honours.

In 1926, he married Daisy Isabel Squire in Jamaica.

== Publications ==
- Fox, H. R. "The Jamaica Railway 1845–1945." The Railway Magazine Volume 91 Number 560, Pages 313–317, November and December 1945.
