= Clarendon Park, Jamaica =

Human settlement in Clarendon Parish, Jamaica

Coordinates: 17°58′58″N 77°21′26″W

Location of Clarendon Park in Jamaica

Clarendon Park is a settlement in Clarendon Parish in south-central Jamaica.

It is the birthplace of Sandie Richards, a track and field bronze medal winner at the 2004 Summer Olympics.

== History ==
Clarendon Park was originally a slave plantation, started sometime prior to 1741, which produced sugar, rum and cattle. The number of enslaved residents was 108 by 1809 and would increase slightly to 116 by 1832, the last population count taken before the abolition of slavery in Jamaica in 1838.

== Transport ==
Clarendon Park used to be served by a railway station on the national railway network.
