= Richmond, Jamaica =

Richmond
- Market Town
- Location within Jamaica
- Coordinates: 18.2418°N 76.8937°W
- Country: Jamaica
- Parish: Saint Mary

Richmond is a market town in Saint Mary parish, in the north-east of Jamaica.

There are several other settlements in Jamaica with this name.

== History ==
Richmond was originally an estate owned a family named "Meek" and was called "Meek Spring". The Meeks sold it to the Duke of Richmond whence its name.

== See also ==
- Geography of Jamaica
- List of cities and towns in Jamaica
- Railway stations in Jamaica
