= Ma Lou =

- Born: Louisa Jones; 1913; Spanish Town, Jamaica
- Died: 1992 (aged 78–79)

Louisa Jones, known as Ma Lou, was a master practitioner of the Jamaican pottery tradition.

== Early life ==
Ma Lou was raised in the Wynters Pen area of Spanish Town by a family of potters. Both her mother and aunts were potters. She learned from her family, having no formal training. She began making pottery at the age of 8. By the age of 13 she was making pottery full-time.

== Career ==
Her production centered around making yabbas, pots with round bottoms that were used for everyday cooking and baking. She made her yabbas in the centuries-old traditional technique, mining and preparing her own clay. Jamaican pottery was a synthetic tradition that combined European and African styles of pottery making, though experts have suggested that Ma Lou's pottery was distinctly more African in style.

Jamaican studio potter Cecil Baugh, who learned techniques from the Jamaican women potters making traditional vessels, brought Ma Lou's work to the attention of the art world. She and Cecil Baugh visited the US to demonstrate traditional Jamaican pottery techniques. She became known as "the traditional Jamaican potter."

Her work produced a steady income until the introduction of aluminium cookware supplanted the use of pottery in everyday cooking. Between 1954 and 1957 she gave up making pots, until she had a vision that inspired her to keep making pots and train her daughters. Her daughter Marlene Roden, called Munchie, carries on her work.

She received the Silver Musgrave Medal from the Institute of Jamaica in 1986 and the Order of Distinction from the Government of Jamaica in 1988.
