= Stonehenge, Jamaica =

Human settlement in northwest Jamaica

Coordinates: 18°14′00″N 77°52′00″W

Stonehenge is a town in northwest Jamaica.

== Namesake ==
Stonehenge is the name of the district in the southwestern most part of Saint James parish in Jamaica. It is also a village within that district. Sometimes written as Stone Henge. See - https://www.geonames.org/11494910/stonehenge.html for the District or see - https://www.geonames.org/3488388/stonehenge.html for the village within the district.

The other Stonehenge is an area within the Sawyers and Kinloss Districts of Trelawny parish in Jamaica. https://www.geonames.org/3488387/stonehenge.html

== Transport ==
It was served by a railway station on the national railway system.

== Education ==
Orange Hill All Age School is just west of the crossroad. As of 2010, the school has three teachers and about 70 students.

== See also ==
- Railway stations in Jamaica
