= Spanish Town =

Spanish Town 22th. Spain
- Town
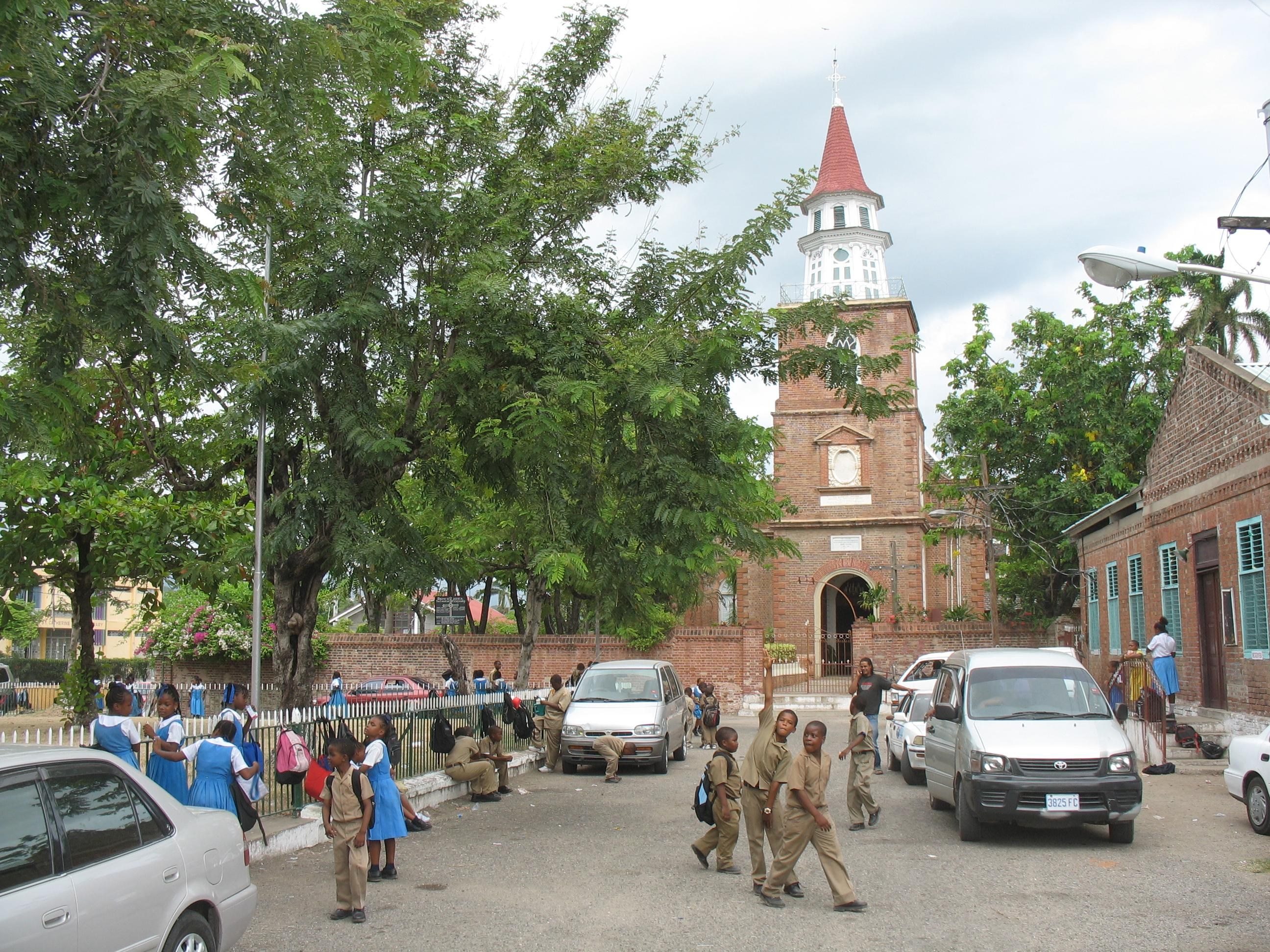
- St. Jago de la Vega Cathedral
- Nickname: Spain
- Location within Jamaica
- Coordinates: 17.9958766°N 76.9551086°W
- Country: Jamaica
- County: Middlesex
- Parish: Saint Catherine
- Founded as Villa de la Vega: 1534

Government
  - Mayor: Norman Scott

Population
  - Estimate (2021): 145,018
- Time zone: UTC-5 (EST)
- Area code: 876
- Website: Official Website (2016)

Spanish Town (Jamaican Patois: Spain) is the capital and the largest town in the parish of St. Catherine in the historic county of Middlesex, Jamaica. It was the Spanish and British capital of Jamaica from 1534 until 1872. The town is home to numerous memorials, the national archives, and one of the oldest Anglican churches outside England (the others are in Virginia, Maryland, and Bermuda).

== History ==
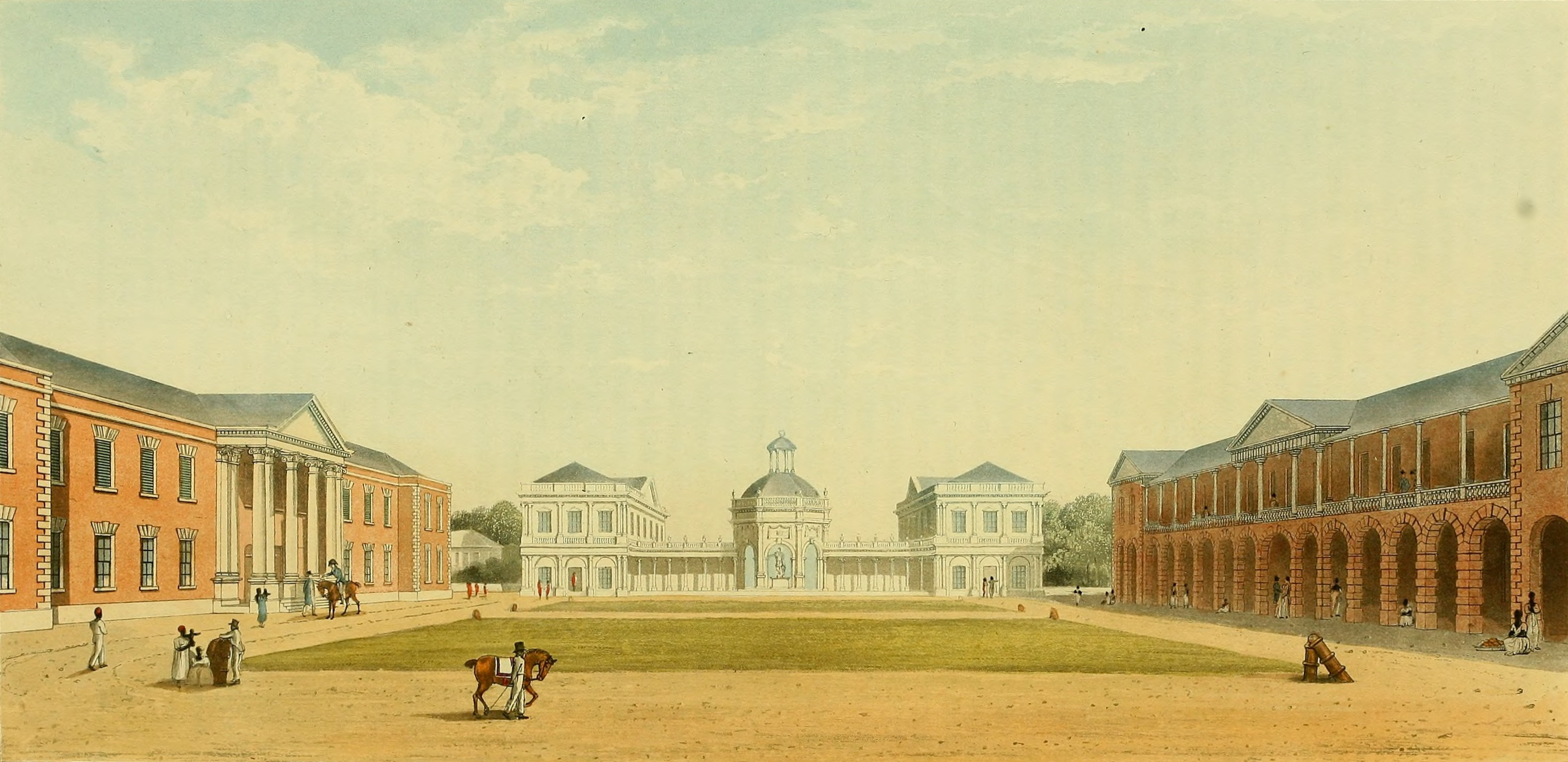
King's Square, St. Jago de la Vega (Spanish Town), 1820-21 from James Hakewill's A Picturesque Tour of the Island of Jamaica (1825).

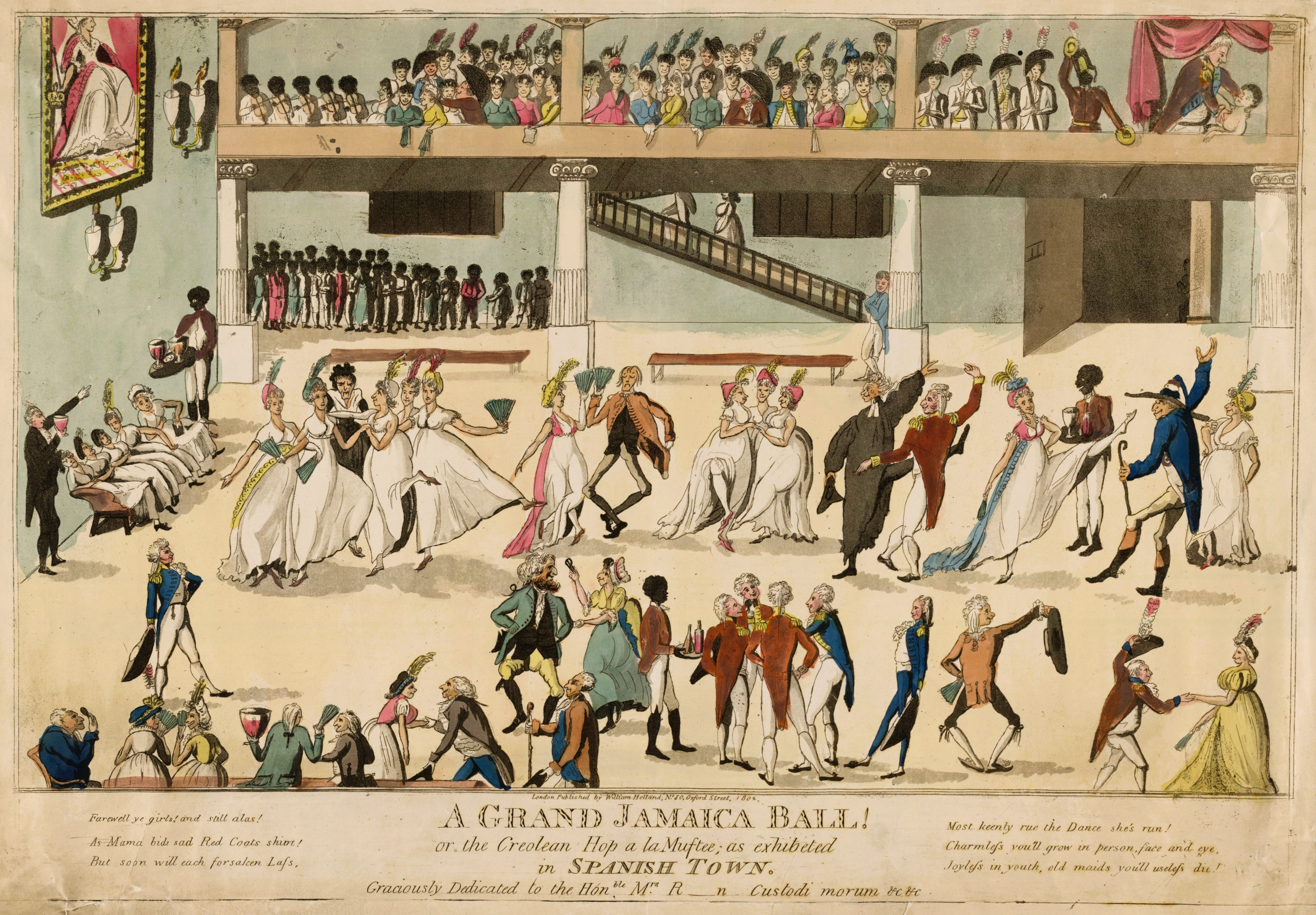
Satirical drawing showing European colonists and enslaved Africans at a ball in Spanish Town in 1802

The Spanish settlement of Villa de la Vega was founded by the Spanish in 1534 as the capital of the colony. Later, it was also called Santiago de la Vega or St. Jago de la Vega. Indigenous Taino had been living in the area for approximately a millennium before this, but this was the first European habitation on the south of the island.

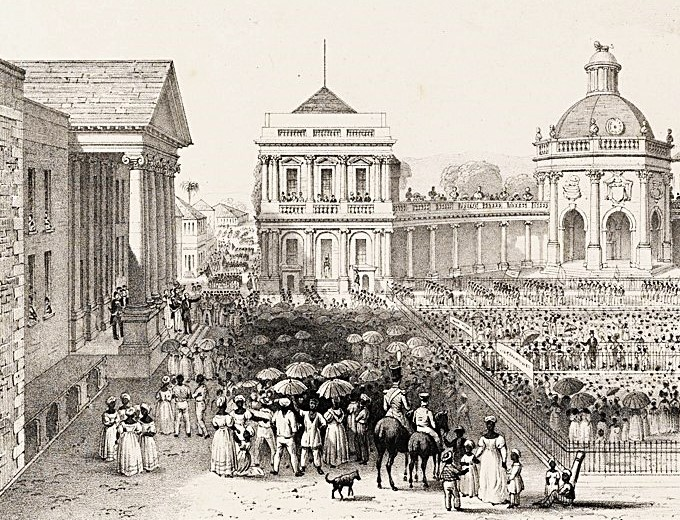
Governor Sir Lionel Smith, accompanied by Revd James Phillippo, proclaiming the abolition of slavery in the colony of Jamaica, on 1 August 1838, from the King's House in Spanish Town

When the English conquered Jamaica in 1655, they renamed the settlement as Spanish Town in honour to the original Spanish root of this town. Since the town was badly damaged during the conquest, Port Royal took on many administrative roles and functioned as an unofficial capital during the beginning of English rule. By the time Port Royal was devastated by an earthquake in 1692, Spanish Town had been rebuilt and was again functioning as the capital. Spanish Town remained the capital until 1872, when the seat of the colony was moved to Kingston.

Kingston had been founded in the aftermath of the 1692 earthquake. By 1755, serious rivalry from lobbyists caused increasing speculation about the continued suitability of Spanish Town as the capital. In 1836, Governor Lionel Smith observed that "the capital was in ruins, with no commercial, manufacturing and agricultural concern in operation." To worsen the situation, following the Morant Bay Rebellion of 1865, Sir John Peter Grant ordered the removal of the capital in 1872 to Kingston. As a larger port, it had come to be considered the natural capital of the island. After the seat of government was relocated, Spanish Town lost much of its economic and cultural vitality.

== Points of interest ==
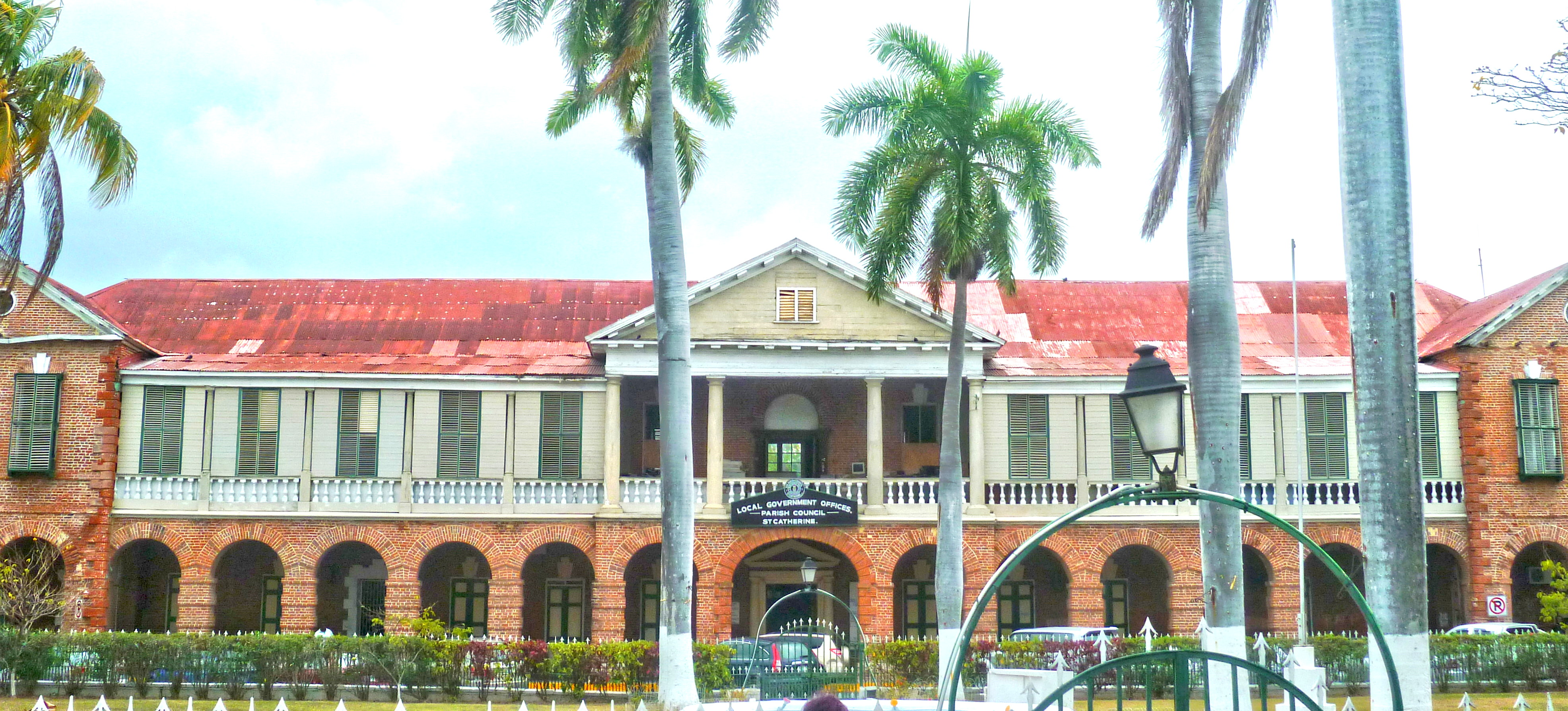
Modern view of the former House of Assembly, now the Town Hall.

Built on the west bank of the Rio Cobre, the town lies thirteen miles (21 km) from Kingston on the main road. Its history was shaped by two significant colonial periods: Spanish rule from 1534 to 1655 and the English from 1655 to 1872. After that the capital was relocated to Kingston. The Anglican Church took over the 16th century cathedral.

The historic architecture and street names mark the colonial history, such as Red Church and White Church streets, symbolic of the Spanish chapels of the red and white cross, as well as Monk Street, in reference to the monastery that once stood nearby. Nugent and Manchester streets were named for the British Colonial Governors, George Nugent and William Montagu, 5th Duke of Manchester. King Street runs past the King's House, the governor's residence, and Constitution Street, near to the Square, refers to the island's former administrative centre. Regency buildings in the town centre include the Rodney Memorial flanked by two guns from the French ship Ville de Paris (1764), and the façade of the Old King's House, which was the residence of the governor until 1872.

=== Old Iron Bridge ===
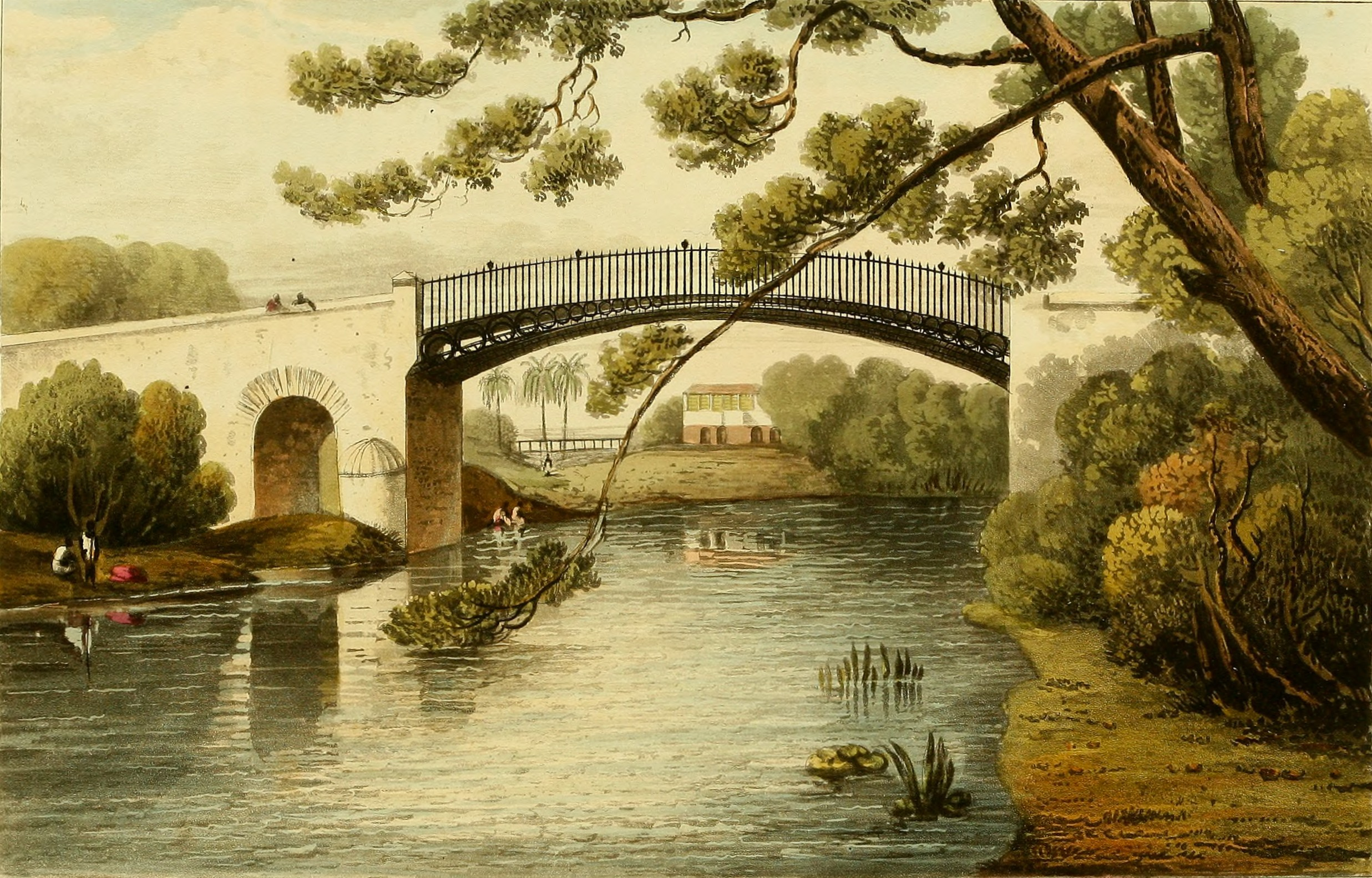
The Iron Bridge

Spanish Town is the site of an early cast-iron bridge, designed by Thomas Wilson and manufactured by Walker and Company of Rotherham, England. Spanning the Rio Cobre, the bridge was erected in 1801 at a cost of £4,000. Its four arched ribs are supported on massive masonry abutments. After the abutments deteriorated, endangering the structure, it was listed in the 1998 World Monuments Watch by the World Monuments Fund.

A restoration project began in 2004, with funding provided by American Express through World Monuments Fund. Progress was slow until 2008, when a renewed restoration effort was made. A first phase of restoration was completed in April 2010, when the repair of the abutments allowed the bridge to be reopened for the public. More recently, violence in the area has prevented the bridge from achieving the status of a UNESCO World Heritage Site.

== Today ==
In 2009, the population of Spanish Town was estimated to be about 160,000. The population of Spanish Town, like the rest of the St. Catherine, has been growing rapidly.

It is sometimes referred to colloquially as "Spain" or "Prison Oval" within Jamaica. The latter nickname is a reference to the cricket pitch or oval located just outside the St. Catherine District Prison, where some inmates can get a limited view of the sport through their cell windows. Association football is also played at the Prison Oval; Rivoli United F.C. is the major team.

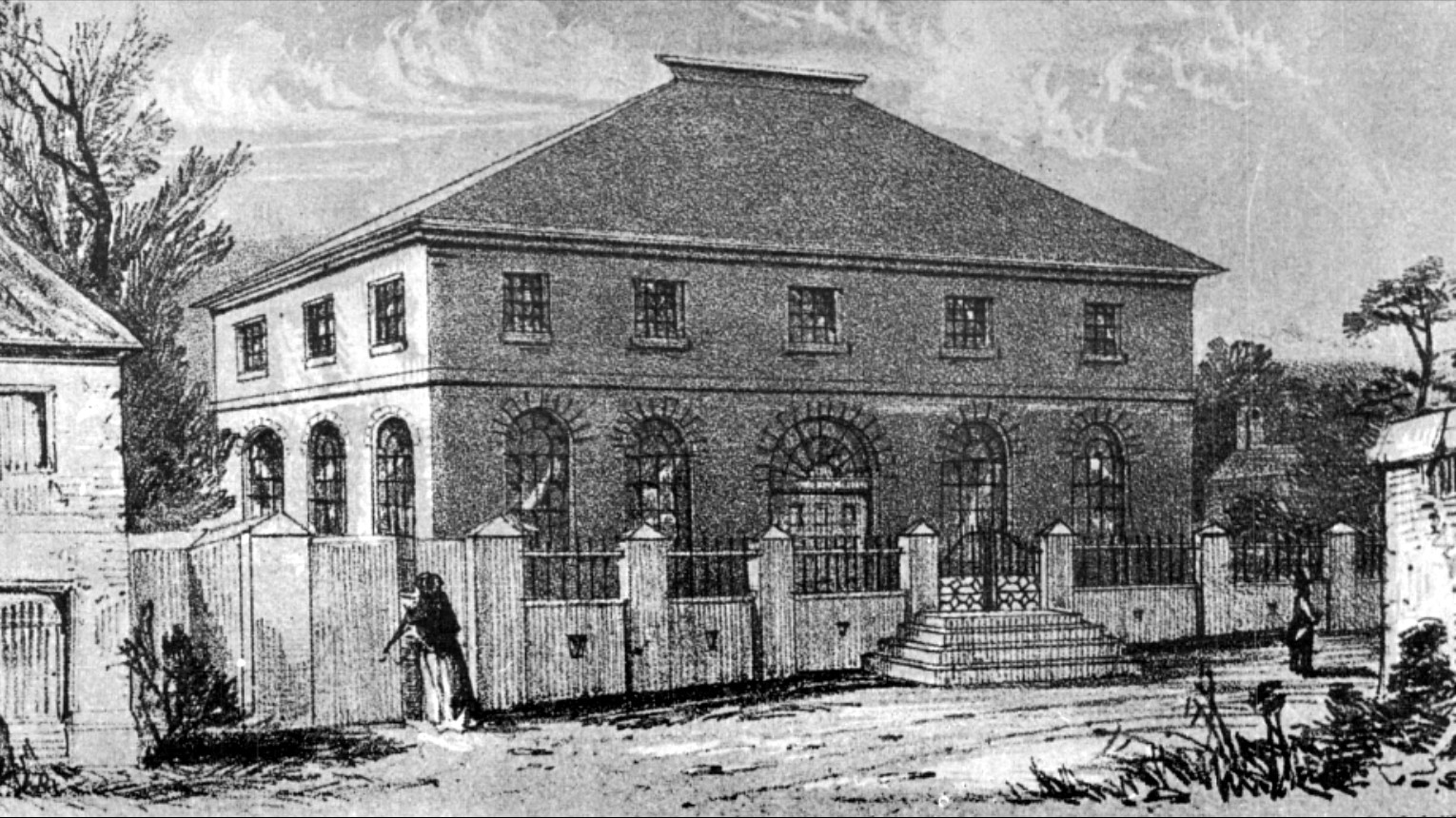
Wesleyan Chapel, Spanish Town.

The town had one of the first Spanish cathedrals to be built in the New World, constructed around 1525. Many Christian denominations have churches or meeting halls in the town, including a Roman Catholic church and Wesleyan, Baptist and Seventh-day Adventist chapels. There is also a mosque.

Standing untouched in character is a historic alms-house, public hospital, and a penal institution built in the eighteenth century. The town contains a factory that manufactures dyes from logwood, a salt factory, and a rice processing plant. In the neighbourhood are five large sugar estates, a milk condensary, and a large textile mill.

== Government and infrastructure ==
The Rio Cobre Juvenile Correctional Centre of the Department of Correctional Services, Jamaica is located in Spanish Town.

== Transportation ==
=== Roads ===
Spanish Town lies between two of the tolled component highways of Highway 2000 project: T1 (PJ Patterson Highway) passes to the south of the town, while T3 (the Edward Seaga Highway), passes to the north.

The A1 enters the town from the east via the Nelson Mandela Highway, and continues north through the town, crossing Angels on its way toward Bog Walk. The A2 begins in Spanish Town, heading west toward Old Harbour.

T3 has little direct relevance to Spanish Town itself, as its nearest interchange is oriented more toward serving Angels rather than the town directly. T1, on the other hand, has a tolled access road providing a direct entrance into Spanish Town.

=== Historical rail ===
The now disused Spanish Town railway station formerly provided access to four lines:

- Kingston to Montego Bay
- Spanish Town to Ewarton
- Bog Walk to Port Antonio
- Linstead to New Works

The station opened in 1845 and closed in October 1992 when all passenger traffic on Jamaica's railways abruptly ceased.

== Notable people ==
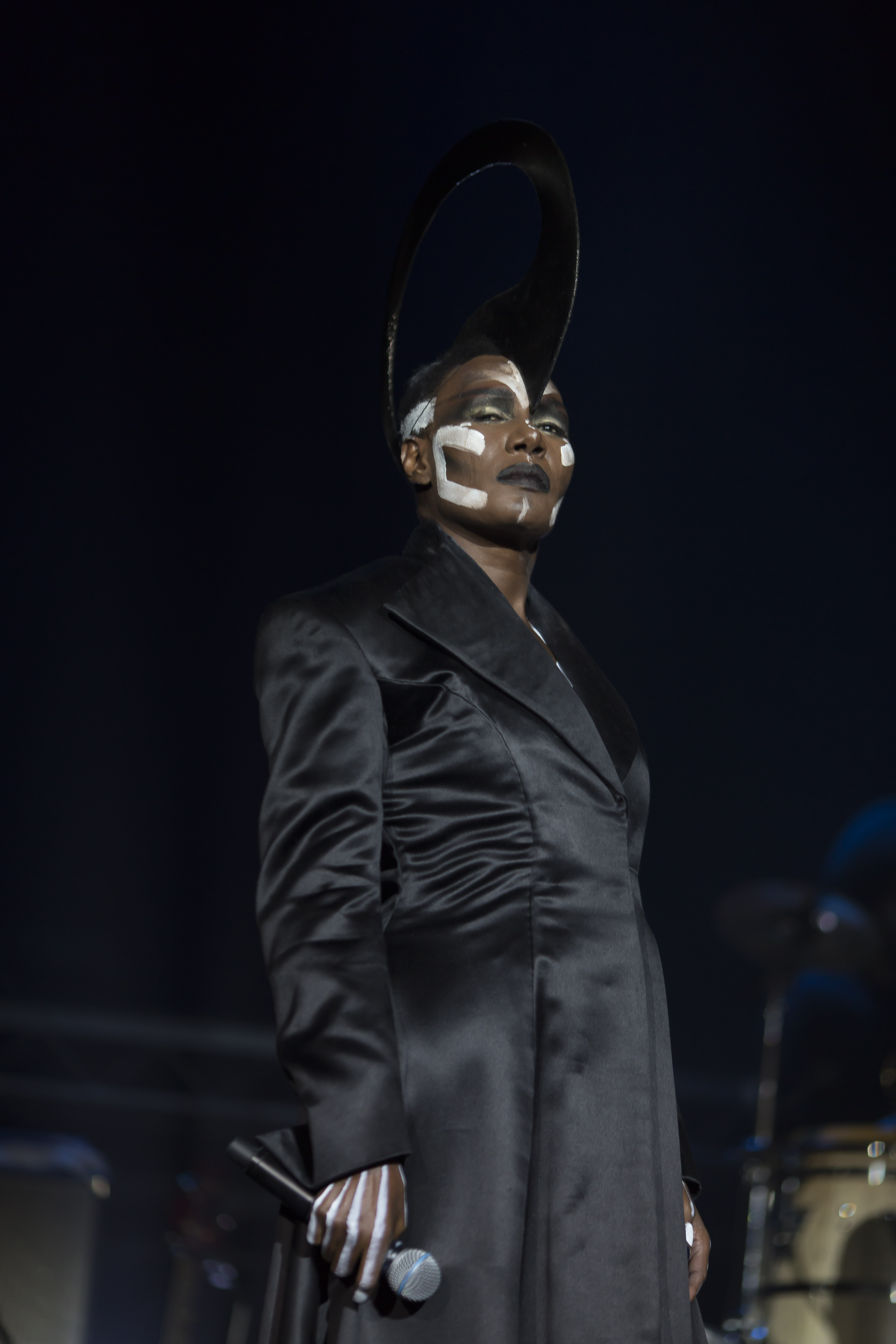
Grace Jones

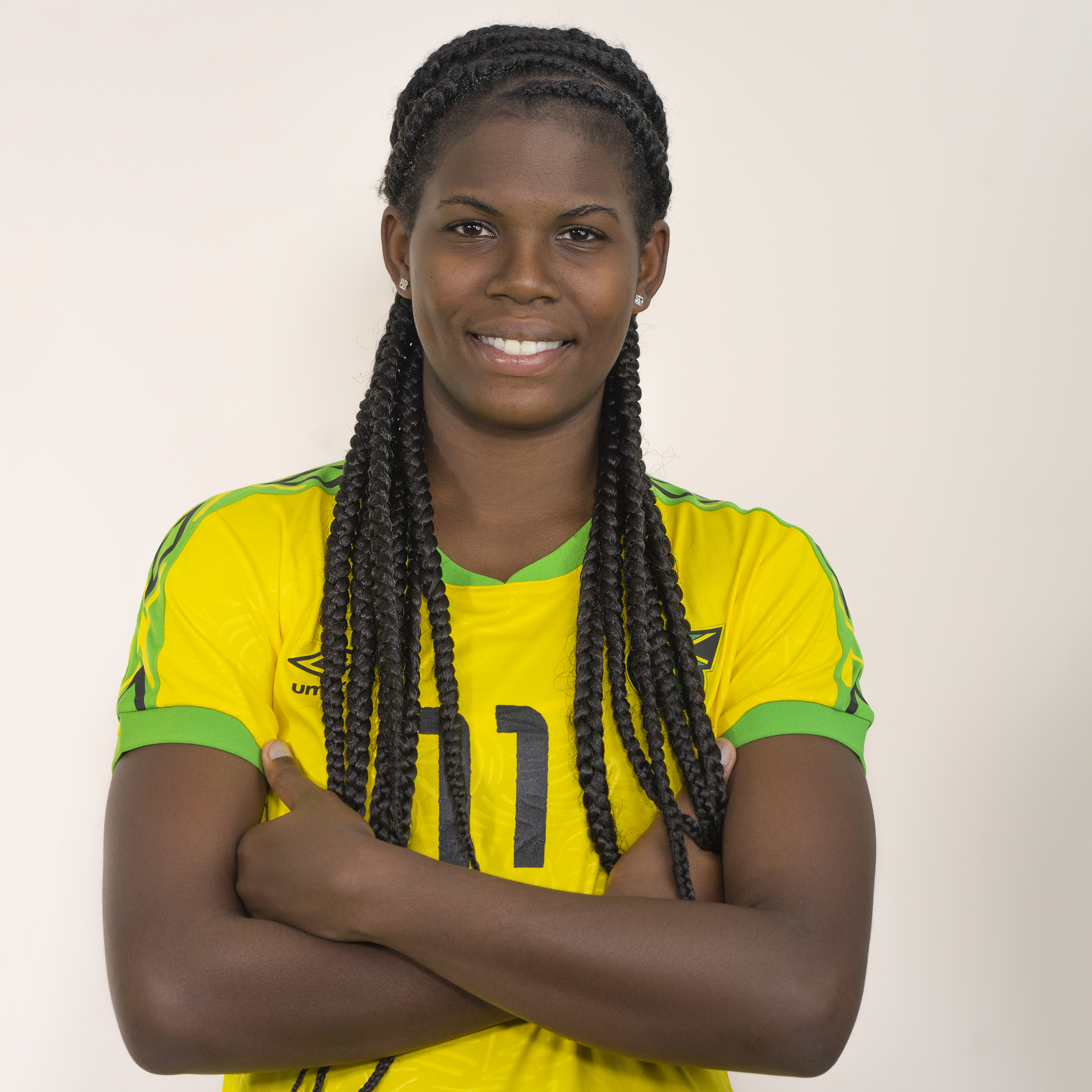
Bunny Shaw

- Ivy Baxter (1923–1993), pioneer in the field of Jamaican dance
- Yohan Blake, sprinter, attended school in Spanish Town
- Anne Brodbelt (1751–1827), letter writer and social observer
- Cornel Chin-Sue, footballer
- Davian Clarke, sprinter
- Chronixx, singer
- Chevelle Franklyn, gospel reggae singer, born in Tawes Pen, Spanish Town
- DJ Akademiks, YouTuber and podcaster, born in Spanish Town
- Lutan Fyah, reggae singer
- Ma Lou, potter
- Rajiv Maragh, Jockey
- Uriah Hall, mixed martial artist, born in Spanish Town
- Andrew Holness, politician, Prime Minister of Jamaica
- Jason Jackson, mixed martial artist
- Randy Brown, mixed martial artist
- Grace Jones, singer and actress, born in Spanish Town
- Diana King, reggae singer, born in Spanish Town
- Original Koffee, reggae singer/rapper, born in Spanish Town
- Jermaine Lawson, cricketer
- Amelia Lewsham, "White Negress" born in Spanish Town in the 1740s
- Oswald George Powe, political and equality activist, born in Kingston but later based in Spanish Town
- Prince Far I, reggae deejay, born in Spanish Town
- Kirk Diamond, reggae singer and social activist.
- Bunny Shaw, Jamaican footballer
- Shirley Anne Tate, Jamaican sociologist, scholar, researcher, educator, and author; born in Spanish Town.
- Spice, dancehall musician, born in Spanish Town
- Alfred Valentine, cricketer
- Micheal Ward, British actor, born in Spanish Town
- Precious Wilson, soul singer, born in Spanish Town
- Harry Mudie, Jamaican record producer, born in Spanish Town

== Other sources ==
- James Robertson, Gone is the Ancient Glory, Spanish Town Jamaica 1534–2000, Kingston, Jamaica: 2005.
- Parish Information
