= Linstead to New Works railway =

Railway line in Jamaica

The Linstead to New Works railway was a railway in Jamaica constructed in 1921 to serve a citrus growing region to the north east of Linstead.

== Gradients ==
Linstead is at 400 feet while New Works is close below the 500 foot contour, so the line must have risen around 79 feet in its three miles for an average gradient of 1 in 200 or thereabouts.

== Stations and Halts ==
There must have been at least 2 stations on the line:

- Linstead Station (Branch Terminus)
- New Works Station (Terminus)

== Tunnels ==
There were no tunnels on the line.

== Bridges ==
There were probably no significant bridges on the line as its junction with the Spanish Town to Ewarton line would have been north of the Rio Magno Gully Bridge (~75m) and there are no other significant water courses between Linstead and New Works.

== See also ==
- Railways of Jamaica
