= Ewarton =

- Town
- Location within Jamaica
- Coordinates: 18.1833333°N 77.0833333°W
- Country: Jamaica
- Parish: St Catherine

Population (2009)
  - Total: 13,807

Ewarton is a town in the parish of Saint Catherine, Jamaica.

== History ==
The name is most likely a compound of the surname "Ewart" and the suffix -ton, meaning town.

The town's economy prospered particularly from 1957 when ALCAN established a bauxite plant nearby. The plant was later transferred to WINDALCO and was closed in early 2009 due to a fall in demand for aluminium as a result of the global recession.

== Amenities ==
Caldo Tours

=== Schools ===
- Ewarton High
- Ewarton Primary
- Polly Ground Primary
- Orangefield Primary

=== Churches ===
There are ten churches:

- Seventh-day Adventist
- Anglican
- Baptist
- Church of Christ
- Church of God of Prophecy
- Gospel Hall
- Gospel Lighthouse
- King's Chapel
- Methodist
- Roman Catholic (St. Catherine of Sienna)

== Other ==
There is a police station, a market which was recently reopened following a three-year closure for refurbishment, and a post office. There is no library, but a Bookmobile visits regularly.

== Transportation ==
Ewarton is served by the A1, known locally in this stretch as the Linstead–Moneague Road, which passes directly through the town. Ewarton does not have its own interchange on T3 (the Edward Seaga Highway), but access to it is via the access road at the Linstead/Ewarton interchange that connects it to the A1 in Linstead.

=== Historical rail ===
From 1885 to 1947 Ewarton railway station was the terminus of a 14-mile railway branch line from Spanish Town. In 1947 the section of the line from Linstead to Ewarton was deemed unprofitable and closed.

== See also ==
- Roads in Jamaica
- Spanish Town to Ewarton railway
