= Spanish Town to Ewarton railway =

Defunct Jamaican railway

The Spanish Town to Ewarton railway was a railway in Jamaica, built to serve the citrus growing regions in the interior of Saint Catherine, particularly those around the towns of Bog Walk, Linstead and Ewarton. It operated from 1885 to 1992.

== History ==
The 14 miles (23 km) of 4 ft 8 1/2 in (1,435 mm) (standard gauge) track from Spanish Town to Ewarton were completed in 1885 at a cost of approximately £93,000.

The section from Linstead to Ewarton was closed in 1947. It was later reopened as far as the Bauxite processing plant just east of Ewarton.

The rest of the line closed to passengers in 1992 but it remains open for Bauxite traffic.

The Spanish Town to Bog Walk section reopened briefly for passenger traffic in 2009/10 while the A1 road through Bog Walk Gorge was closed for major repair work.

== Gradients ==
The line climbs 700 feet (213.4 m) in 14 miles (23 km) (average gradient 1 in 106 or 0.0094%) from Spanish Town station (just under 100 feet or 30.5 metres) to its summit at Ewarton (800 feet).

== Stations and Halts ==
There were 4 stations and 5 halts on the line:

- Spanish Town Station (Branch Terminus)
- St. John’s Road Halt
- Angels Halt
- Crescent Halt
- Bog Walk Station
- Michleton Halt
- Linstead Station
- Sterling Castle Halt
- Ewarton Station] (Terminus)

== Tunnels ==
There are 4 tunnels, from south to north:

- Number 1 ~100 m
- Number 2 ~160 m
- Number 3 ~110 m
- Number 4 ~665 m

== Bridges ==
There are 7 significant bridges on the line:

- Viaduct ~70 m
- Thomas River ~15 m
- Rio Cobre ~40 m
- Viaduct (not visible in satellite imagery)
- Rio Magno Gully ~85 m
- Byndloss Gully ~20 m
- Unnamed Gully ~40 m
