= Kingston to Montego Bay railway =

The Kingston to Montego Bay railway was the main railway in Jamaica, which from 1845 to 1992 linked the capital Kingston with the second city Montego Bay, passing en route most of the major towns.

== Construction, operation and closure ==
The first 14.5 miles (23.3 km) of 4 ft 8 1/2 in (1,435 mm) (standard gauge) track were laid from Kingston to Angels (just north of Spanish Town) in 1845 at a cost of £222,250, or £15,377 per mile against a budgeted cost £150,000.

An 11-mile (18 km) extension from Spanish Town to Old Harbour was added in 1869 at a cost of £60,000.

A further 24.5 miles (39.4 km) extension from Old Harbour to Porus was added in 1885 at a cost of around £187,000.

The final 62 miles (100 km) from Porus to Montego Bay was completed in 1895.

Much of the line closed in October 1992 when all passenger traffic on Jamaica's railways abruptly ceased. Some sections remain in use for bauxite and alumina freight while the section from Montego Bay to the Appleton Estate remained open for a while as a tourist attraction.

== Gradients and curvature ==
From Kingston the line ran west along the coastal plain, within 50 feet (15.2 m) of sea level, for about 40 miles (64 km) before starting a gentle climb over 5.25 miles (8.45 km) from Bodles to 250 feet (76.2 m) near Lancaster Halt. From here there was a plateau for about 24.25 miles (39.03 km) to the Milk River and the start of the 20 miles (32 km) climb through Scotts Pass and Porus to 1,500 feet (457.2 m) just north of Kendal.

Between Kendal and Mile Gully the line reaches its summit at around 1,700 feet (518.2 m); in this section the ruling curvature was 300 feet (91.4 m) and the ruling gradient was 1 in 30 (3.33%).

From Mile Gully there was a gentle descent over 17 miles (27 km) to 500 feet (152.4 m) near Raheen. From here the line ran on the level across the Appleton Plain to Maggotty and the start of a climb to 1,000 feet (304.8 m) near Stonehenge. From here to Catadupa the line ran on the level then descended to 500 feet (152.4 m) at Seven River. Another level section brought it to Long Hill Tunnel and the final descent into Montego Bay.

== Stations and halts ==
There were 22 stations and 17 halts:

- Kingston (Terminus)
- Greenwich Town Halt
- Marcus Garvey Drive Halt
- Hunts Bay Halt
- Gregory Park Station
- Grange Lane Station
- Spanish Town Station
- Horizon Park Halt
- Hartlands Halt
- Bushy Park Halt
- Old Harbour Station
- May Pen Station
- Jacob’s Hut
- Four Paths Station
- Rock Halt
- Clarendon Park Station
- Scott’s Pass Halt
- Porus Station
- Williamsfield Station
- Kendal Station
- Grove Place Halt
- Greenvale Station
- Comfort Hall Halt
- Duck Pond Halt
- Oxford Halt
- Balaclava Station
- Siloah Halt
- Appleton Station
- Appleton Tourist Halt
- Maggotty Station
- Ipswich Station
- Breadnut Walk Halt
- Stonehenge Station
- Catadupa Station
- Cambridge Station
- Montpelier Station
- Anchovy Station
- Ailford’s Halt
- Gordon’s Halt
- Montego Bay (Terminus)

== Tunnels ==
There are 13 tunnels on the line:

No.	Name	Distance from Kingston		Parish	Length	
No.	Name	miles	km	Parish	feet	metres
1	Scotts Pass	44 1/4	71.2	Clarendon	70	21.3
2	Scotts Pass	44 1/2	71.6	Clarendon	170	51.8
3	Comfort Hall	65 1/2	105.4	St. Elizabeth	688	209.1
4	Balaclava	70	112.6	St. Elizabeth	348	106.1
5	Highworth	84	135.2	St. Elizabeth	182	55.5
6	Y S	84 1/2	136.0	St. Elizabeth	218	66.4
7	Ipswich	86 1/4	138.8	St. Elizabeth	855	260.6
8	(unnamed)	87 3/4	141.2	St. James	555	164.6
9	Merrywood	88 1/2	142.4	St. James	362	115.8
10	Anchovy	104 1/2	168.2	St. James	102	31.1
11	Ramble	108	173.8	St. James	182	55.5
12	Bogue Hill	108 1/2	174.6	St. James	1,276	388.9
13	Bogue Hill	108 3/4	175.0	St. James	458	139.6

== Bridges ==
There were 51 significant bridges and one viaduct on the line

- Trench Town Gully
- Shoemakers Gully
- Cockfight Bridge (gully)
- Salt River
- Rio Cobre
- Irrigation canal east
- Irrigation canal west
- Creek Town Gully
- Track (rail over)
- Irrigation canal
- Cut Throat Gully
- Spring Garden River
- Irrigation canal east
- Irrigation canal west
- Coleburns Gully
- Church Pen Gully east
- Church Pen Gully west
- Stony Gully
- Fraser's Gully
- Old Harbour(?) River
- Bowers Gully
- Palmetto Gully
- Hunts Pen road (rail over)
- A2 road (rail under)
- Rio Minho - originally completed in 1874, it was completely rebuilt during the second decade of the twentieth century by Hewson (of the Jamaica Government Railway) using the then new method of concrete blocks
- Jacks or St Annes Gully #1
- Jacks or St Annes Gully #2
- Jacks or St Annes Gully #3
- Jacks or St Annes Gully #4
- Flemings (sic) Gully east
- Flemings (sic) Gully west
- Milk River
- Milk River (seasonal)
- Track (rail over)
- Kendal - Mandeville road (rail over)
- B6 road, Balaclava (rail under)
- Black River #1
- Black River #2
- Black River #3
- Ipswich - Merrywood road (rail under)
- Richmond Hill road (rail under)
- B6 road, Jubilee (rail under)
- Seven River #1
- Seven River #2
- Seven River #3
- Seven River #4
- Seven River #5
- Browns River
- Anchovy Gully
- B8 road, Mount Carey (rail under)
- Bogue Viaduct
- Montego River

== Junctions ==
There were three branch line junctions, three railway works junctions and four estate railway junctions on the line:

Branch lines

- Spanish Town Junction to Bog Walk, Ewarton, New Works and Port Antonio
- May Pen Junction to Frankfield
- Logans Junction to Fort Simmonds

Railway works

- Kingston railway workshops
- Kingston permanent way department
- Kingston engine sheds

Estate railways

- Caymanas estate
- Bridge Pen
- Raheen
- Appleton

Bauxite lines

- Bodles

Piers

- Kingston railway piers numbers 1, 2 & 3
