= Kingston railway station, Jamaica =

Railway station in Jamaica

Kingston
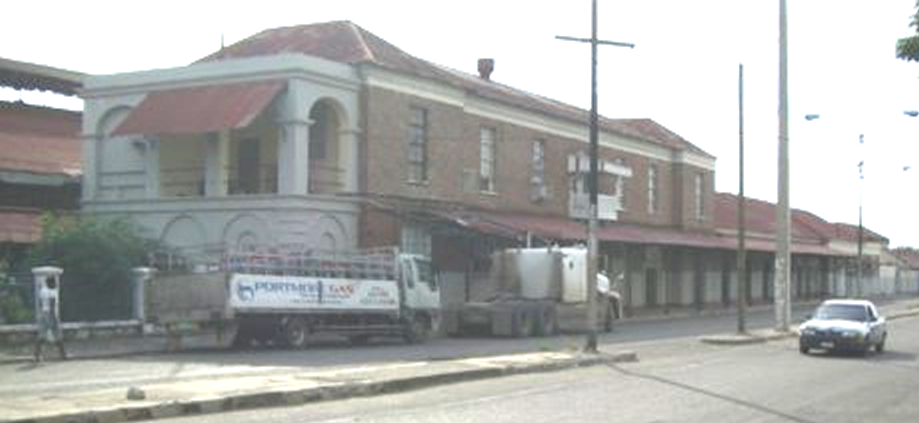
- Kingston railway terminus, front elevation.

General information
- Coordinates: 17.968773°N 76.797009°W
- Owner: Jamaica Railway Corporation
- Lines: Kingston to Montego Bay main line Spanish Town to Ewarton branch line Bog Walk to Port Antonio branch line May Pen to Frankfield branch line
- Platforms: Single platform terminus
- Tracks: One

History
- Opened: 1845
- Closed: 1992-10
Location
- Location within Jamaica

Kingston railway terminus was built in the Jamaica Georgian architectural style using brick. It was constructed on a grand scale, symbolising its importance as the main terminus of the Jamaica railways. It has prominent arcades on both levels of the east entrance end. Victorian cast iron brackets support the roof overhang on the trackside. It has sash windows on the ground and upper floors.

It was opened in 1845 and closed in 1992. It provided rail services to Montego Bay, Port Antonio, Ewarton and Frankfield. In addition to the station and its single platform there were extensive sidings, engine sheds, engine repair works, a roundhouse, a turntable, a traverser and a connection to the nearby railway piers.

One source claims it was "utterly destroyed" in the 1907 Kingston earthquake. However, in 2003 it was reported as being in "very good condition" and needing only "minor repairs".

It is on the list of designated National Heritage Sites in Jamaica.

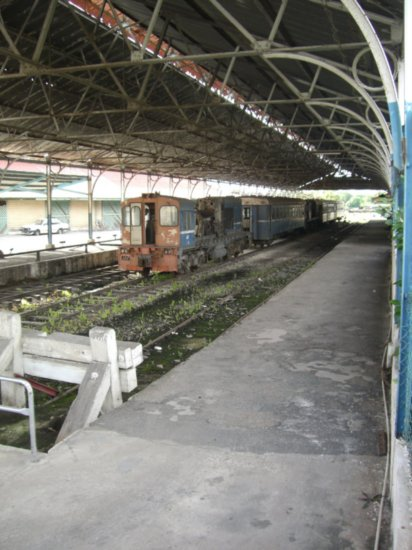
Looking out of Kingston railway terminus along the permanent way from near the buffers.

== See also ==
- Railway stations in Jamaica
