= Rail transport in Jamaica =

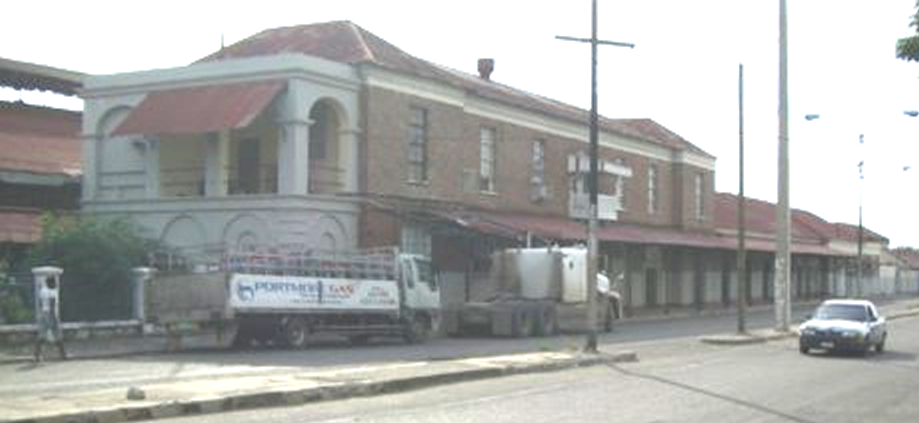
Kingston railway station, closed since 1992, as seen in 2007

The first railways of Jamaica were constructed from 1845, making it the second British colony to receive a railway system, following Canada in 1836 with the Champlain and St Lawrence Railroad. Construction started only twenty years after the Stockton & Darlington Railway commenced operations in the United Kingdom.

The public passenger railway service in Jamaica, which ended in October 1992, had a brief revival in 2011 only to be closed once again in August 2012. The Parliament of Jamaica had supported a revival under a public joint venture corporation with an offshore partner. Private freight transport continues on limited tracks leading to the various docks around the island, transporting bauxite and sugar cane for export.

== History ==
=== 1845 to World War II ===
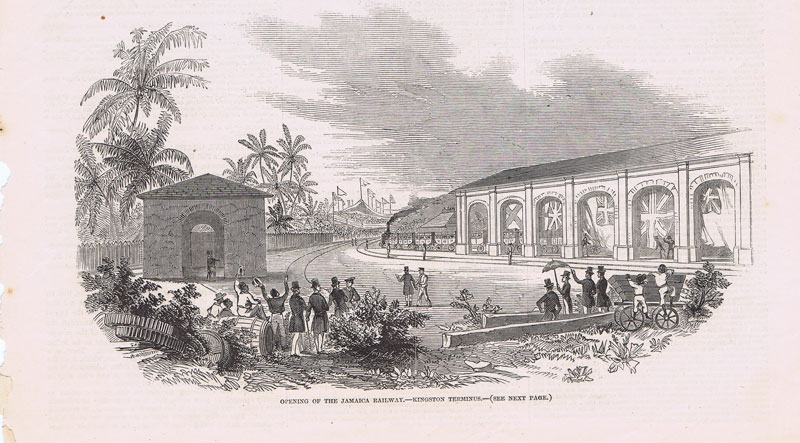
Opening of the Jamaica Railway - Kingston Terminus

The first railway, the Western Jamaica Connecting Railway, was built in 1845 from Kingston 23.3 kilometres (14.5 mi) to Angels near Spanish Town. The railway was proposed and started by William Smith, originally from Manchester who owned land in Jamaica, and his sugar planter brother David.

The system approved by the Assembly of Jamaica in 1843 was for a double track between Kingston and Spanish Town, with branch lines to Angels, Port Henderson and the Caymanas sugar estate. On 21 November 1845 the Governor of Jamaica James Bruce, 8th Earl of Elgin and ten carriages of passengers, pulled by the company's two locomotives Projector and Patriot built by Sharp Brothers of Manchester, travelled 19 kilometres (12 mi) from Kingston to Spanish Town. The first train came after the British Government had enacted the Sugar Duties Act 1846 and just after the emancipation of slaves, meaning the sugar industry needed the efficiency that the railway would bring to the island.

The construction of the first single-track section was budgeted to cost £150,000, but cost £222,250, or £15,377 per kilometre (£24,747 per mile). As a result of the cost of building and a downturn in the sugar industry, only another 18 kilometres (11 mi) were added until 1869 in the form of an extension from Spanish Town to Old Harbour at a cost of £60,000.

=== Spanish Town to Ewarton railway ===
After a period of decline, the new Governor Sir Anthony Musgrave agreed a deal in 1879 to buy the existing 42 kilometres (26 mi) of the system for £93,932. After an investment and improvement programme, the expansion of the citrus and banana industries led to two extensions, extending the total system to 105 kilometres (65 mi): westward from Old Harbour to Porus (39.4 kilometres (24.5 mi)); northwards from Angel to the interior district of Ewarton (22.93 kilometres (14.25 mi)). Both were completed in 1885 at a total cost of approximately £280,000

=== Bog Walk to Port Antonio ===
After debates about extensions, on 1 January 1890 the railway was transferred to an American consortium headed by New York merchant Frederick Wesson, and extensions from Porus 100 kilometres (62 mi) to Montego Bay in 1895, and an extension through the banana, cacao, citrus and coconut districts of St Catherine, St Mary and Portland was developed over 87 kilometres (54 mi) from Bog Walk to Port Antonio in 1896. The Jamaican system now had a total of 298 kilometres (185 mi) of railway lines stretching from the south-eastern to the north-western and north-eastern ends of the island.

=== Jamaica Railway Corporation ===
The loans taken out to secure railway ownership by the company, together with its purchase of 308 square kilometres (76,000 acres) of prime Crown land in various parts of Jamaica, proved too strenuous. After defaulting in 1897 and 1898, by order of the Jamaican Supreme Court the company fell into receivership. In 1900 the government assumed responsibility for the railway again, and made it a department of government. It appointed a Railway Advisory Board in 1902 to advise, which remained in place until 1960 when the statutory 100% government owned J$6million company the Jamaica Railway Corporation was created.

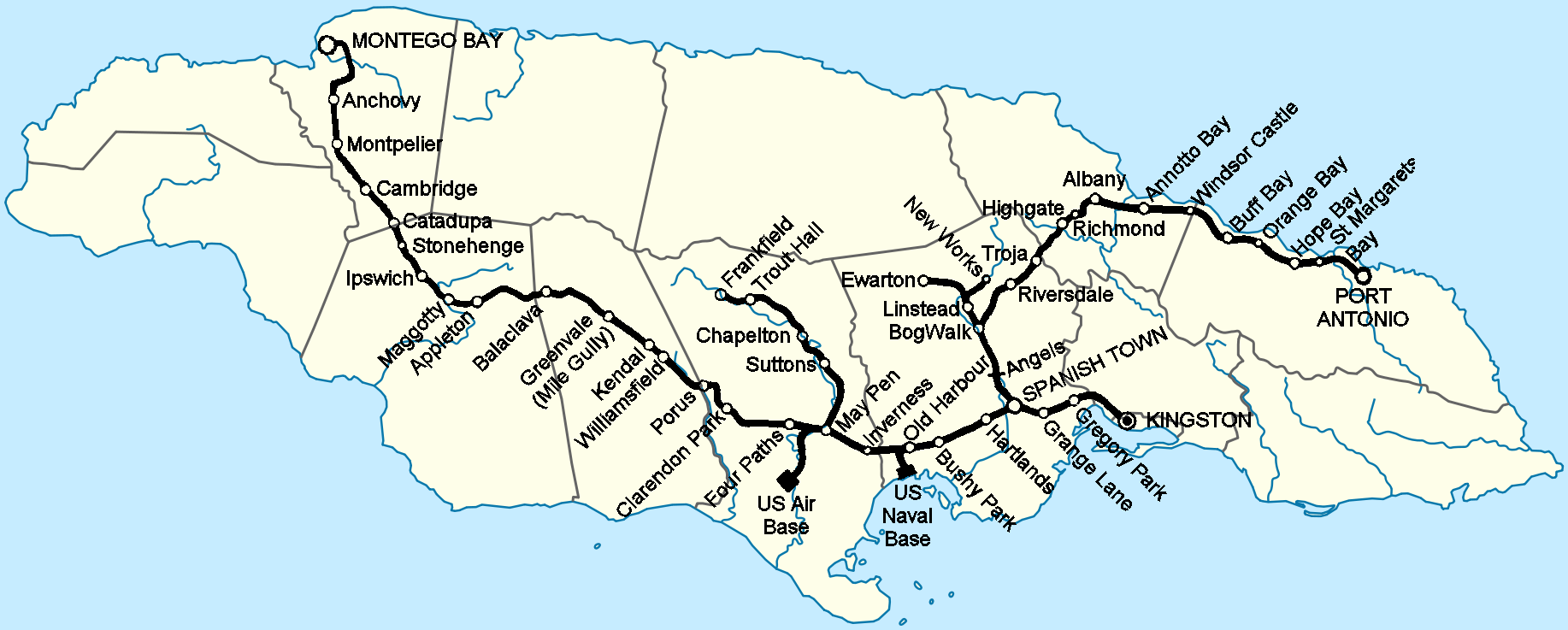
Map of the Jamaica railway system at its pre-bauxite peak c. 1945

Between 1900 and 1950, less than 80 kilometres (50 mi) of track was added, mainly to support opening of the interior to banana cultivation:

- 1911 - May Pen to Frankfield railway: 21-kilometre (13 mi) branch off the Montego Bay line, from May Pen to Chapelton, completed in 1913 and extended in 1925 by 16 kilometres (10 mi) to Frankfield.
- 1921 - Linstead to New Works railway: 4.8 kilometres (3 mi) from Linstead to New Works, opened on the Bog Walk to Ewarton extension.
- 1942 - in support of military needs for World War II, a 10.5-kilometre (6.5 mi) branch line from Logan's Junction near May Pen, to the US military base at Fort Simmonds in Vernamfield. The British government purchased four USATC S161 Class to provide transport for the military base. After the line closed in 1956, these were subsumed by JRC.

=== Bauxite lines ===
In the 1940s deposits of bauxite were discovered in the interior, and companies developed both interconnected as well as independent lines to extract, process and ship the minerals:

- Alcan - used the JRC lines from Bodles to ship its product to Port Esquivel, completing 5 kilometres (3 mi) of lines in 1951
- Alcoa - built an 31-kilometre (19 mi) railway in 1962 to connect its Woodside mines with the port at Rocky Point Port. It was leased to the JRC; Alcoa provided locomotives, rolling stock and its staff operated and maintained the line under JRC management
- Kaiser Bauxite Company - built 19 kilometres (12 mi) of independent track and 12.1 kilometres (7.5 mi) of sidings running from mines in upper Saint Ann Parish to Discovery Bay. The company tended to run Baldwin locomotives, and purchased eight between 1952 and 1971.
- Alpart - built 18 kilometres (11 mi) of independent track in the 1970s to connect its refinery at Nain with Port Kaiser near Alligator Pond
- Reynolds - built a short independent railway to link mines, drying plants and ports
- Windalco - Bauxite Line

=== After World War II ===
The agricultural driven growth of the railways was created by the harsh interior geography, and developing consumer needs meant that bananas had to be on a ship within two days of cutting. Shipping rose from 330,000 stems in 1880 to 24 million stems in 1930; then a decline in the industry ended rail transport of bananas by 1969. In 1895 Jamaica had exported 97 million fruits; by 1940 the figure had fallen to 40 million, and after the loss of the monopoly of the British market and the 1951 hurricane it was 5 million in 1975. Passenger use fell, partly because of the bridge-building programme begun by the government before the war. By 1971 Jamaica had 11,590 kilometres (7,200 mi) of roads, 1,350 of which were paved; alongside motorbuses which were accessing further inland, private cars had increased from 15,000 in 1950 to 142,300 in 1975.

After a post-war report by C. E. Rooke recommended closure of the Port Antonio to Spanish Town line, the government only closed the Linstead to Ewarton branch in 1947. The 1951 hurricane brought about a recommendation by the United Nations envoy to invest in the railway to keep the bauxite traffic, and hence the passenger rates, economically viable.

== Jamaica Railway Corporation ==
=== 1960 to 1975 ===
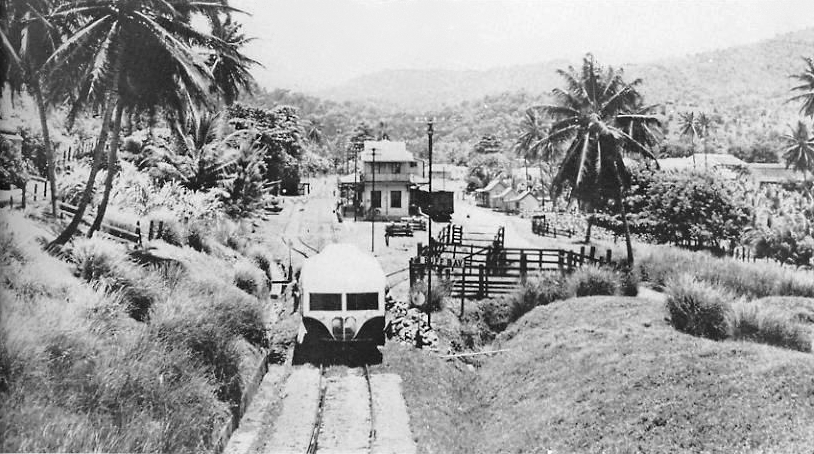
A motorized railcar leaving Buff Bay station, in 1960

The government agreed change of the railway after the 1 September 1957 crash, the worst transport accident in Jamaica's history, in which a 12-car wooden body train carrying 1,600 passengers derailed at Kendal, killing 175 passengers and injuring over 800.

The first diesel power had entered Jamaica in 1939 with two D Wickham & Co diesel coaches. After the creation of the Jamaica Railway Corporation in 1960, management increased this transformation significantly from 1963 onwards:

- 19 multi-unit Metro-Cammell railcars, powered by Rolls-Royce C6T Mark IV engines of 260 kW (350 hp) acquired at for J$621,000. These were all composite in two formations, with 7 cars carrying 20 first-class and 58 second-class passengers; and 30 cars with 83 second-class passengers
- The unique "market car wheel" built by Metro-Cammell, a modified boxcar fitted to carry passengers and their goods to market
- Two Clayton Equipment Company shunting locomotives with the same Rolls-Royce driving system as the Metro-Cammell boxcars
- Two English Electric 750 h.p. locomotives to handle bauxite traffic
- Steam traction ended in 1964 but in 1966 class M3 4-8-0 No.54 was restored to working order for use on special excursion trains, the first one of which was named The Banana Boat Steam Train which ran between Kingston and Port Antonio on 17 July 1966. "Engine 54" was celebrated in a song by that title released in 1968 by The Ethiopians, one of the leading Jamaican musical groups of the Rocksteady era.

In 1967, two ALCO DL532 1,200 h.p. diesel-electric locomotives were purchased. By 1970 Jamaica's railways had fourteen diesel-electric locomotives and only one steam locomotive was still in operation. Between 1972 and 1976, an additional 18 ALCO RS-8s, manufactured by Montreal Locomotive Works in Canada, were purchased in three batches of six locomotives.

By 1975 there were:

- 348.4 kilometres (216.5 mi) of 1,435 mm (4 ft 8 1/2 in) (standard gauge) in control of JRC
- 47 kilometres (29 mi) of private industrial railways in Jamaica
- Totalling 370 kilometres (230 mi)
- Carrying 1.2 million passengers per annum
- Transporting 900 million tonnes of goods, 95% bauxite and alumina which had driven the shippage from 900,000 tonnes in 1959

=== Closure ===
By 1973 JRC's operational deficit had risen to J$3.4 million, and in 1975 it was nearing J$4 million and carrying a J$11 million loan. The government was paying over J$1.4 million in subsidy to keep the island's trains running. The financial crisis had led to a backlog of deferred maintenance, with stock and buildings also neglected. In 1974 the May Pen-Frankfield line closed, with the Bog Walk-Port Antonio line closing in 1975.

Public pressure forced the government to reopen the Port Antonio line at a cost of J$1.4 million in 1977. The condition of the track resulted in reclosure of the line in 1978. Hurricane Allen in 1980 damaged much of the JRC railway system, and totally destroyed a section of the Port Antonio line running along the coast between Buff Bay and Orange Bay.

In October 1992 public railway transport services ceased operating on Jamaica, although four of the private industrial lines continue to operate today, in part using JRC lines. Of the total of 272 kilometres (169 mi) standard gauge at the time on the island, 207 kilometres (129 mi) of common carrier service belonging to JRC are no longer operational, leaving 65 kilometres (40 mi) in private hands.

=== Current operations ===
The Jamaican Railway Corporation still exists today (see below under "Revival"). It is responsible for management of the JRC interests and property, and maintaining its locomotives but not the rolling stock.

In November 1990 JRC signed a 30-year Track User Agreement with Alcan Jamaica, which was renegotiated with the successor Windalco in December 2001.

The company makes J$40 million per year through track user fees for the hauling of alumina and bauxite, and the residual from the rental of real estate and its three operable locomotives. The company has a staff of 76, who fulfil contractual obligations to users of the company's facilities.

=== Revival ===
In 2002 Jamaican Government discussed resumption of national railway services, initially with Canadian National Railway and then Rail India Technical and Economic Service (RITES); and now with the China Railway after a deal was signed by the Prime Minister P J Patterson with Chinese vice-president Zeng Qinghong in Jamaica in February 2005. During the 1990s, a plan was considered which would see commuter services between Kingston and Spanish Town, later extended to Linstead. It was proposed to cost US$8 million and be running by January 2001, with the government holding 40% of a public-private venture.

Passenger service returned to Jamaica for the first time since February 1992 on 16 April 2011, when an inaugural train operated from May Pen to Linstead. There was also talk of establishing a tourist route on Jamalco's line between Rocky Point and Breadnut, but all passenger services were stopped again in August 2012.

In 2022, the rail status shifted again, as a passenger service began transporting students from Old Harbour and Linstead to Spanish Town. The service was discontinued in January 2025 due to funding issues at the JRC and a similar service is now operated by the Jamaica Urban Transit Company (JUTC) as bus route 605.

== Mail carriage ==
Records of the railway being used for mail service exist as far back as 1873 (when the postmaster terminated the railway's mail contract).

From 1 September 1913 sorting carriages were added to trains on the main routes: Kingston to Port Antonio and Kingston to Montego Bay. These carriages were fitted with posting boxes.

The travelling post office service resumed on 28 March 1927. Its last run was on 14 May 1966. An official note c.1954 stated that "passenger trains between Kingston and Montego Bay (TPO 1) and Kingston and Port Antonio (TPO 2) are each equipped with a post office with a postman in charge. There is a letter-box at each station which the train postman clears en route."

== Architecture ==
The railway architecture, developed and seen through the stations which were built between 1845 and 1896, is a reflection of classical Jamaican Georgian architecture. Although under the care and maintenance of the JRC, those that are not used for commercial purposes and rented out to traders are presently in a state of disrepair.

== Accidents ==
The Jamaica Railways have two serious accidents:

- 30 July 1938 - a passenger train was heading from Kingston to Montego Bay. The engine jumped the rails at Balaclava and embedded itself into the mountainside, followed by coaches which were forced on from the rear. 32 people died and over 70 were injured.
- 1 September 1957 - a diesel-hauled train of 12 wooden carriages left Kingston for Montego Bay. The outbound journey had 900 passengers on board, correlating with the design limit of 80 passengers per carriage. However, the return journey had 1,600 passengers loaded at 130-150 persons per carriage including hundreds of members of the Holy Name Society of St. Anne's Roman Catholic Church, 'close to a hundred known criminals' including pickpockets, and their targets the tourists who made up over 1,000 of the total passenger loading. At 23:30 near Kendal, Manchester three shrill whistle blasts signalled that the driver had lost control of the train, and it derailed minutes later at speed. 200 people lost their lives, and 700 sustained injuries in the worst transport disaster in Jamaica's history, and the second worst rail disaster in the world at that time. The cause of the accident was determined to be the closure of an angled wheel (brake) cock, with survivors suggesting that the pickpockets had tampered with the brakes while riding on the carriage platforms. Confidence in the rail service was shaken and much looting and robbing of the dead and injured occurred. The ensuing investigation found deficiencies in the Jamaica Railway Corporation, which was resultantly given its independence in 1960.

== Natural disasters ==
- 14 January 1907 - Kingston experienced a great earthquake which demolished many railway buildings and killed or injured officials, officers and employees.
- 18 May 1909 - Number 2 railway pier in Kingston destroyed by fire.
- 1951 - Hurricane Charlie caused extensive damage to railway infrastructure.
- 1988 - Hurricane Gilbert caused extensive damage to railway infrastructure.

== General manager ==
The Corporation has a General Manager, also known (in the 21st century) as the Chief Executive Officer.

1845–1865	David Smith
1900-????	James Richmond
c.1945	H R Fox
c.1952	J C Atkinson
1980s	Kerith Foster
c.2005	Owen Crooks
current	Fitzroy Williams

== See also ==
- Lists of rail accidents
- List of railway tunnels in Jamaica
- Rail transport by country
- Transportation in Jamaica
