= Roads in Jamaica =

The roads in Jamaica allow people and goods to traverse the island of Jamaica, which is the third largest in the Caribbean. As of 2011, Jamaica has road network 22,121 kilometres in length.

== Road network ==
According to the National Works Agency, in 2007 Jamaica had 844 km of arterial roads, 717 km of secondary roads, 3225 km of tertiary roads, 282 km of urban roads, and 10326 km of parochial roads. Using data from 2011, the CIA World Factbook claimed Jamaica has a total road network of 22121 km, 5973 km of which was unpaved and 16148 km of which was paved.

== Governing legislation ==
Various pieces of legislation govern the construction, maintenance, classification, and operation of roads in Jamaica. They include the Road Traffic Act, the Toll Road Act, the Parochial Roads Act, and the Main Roads Act. Government agencies with various responsibilities relating to roads in Jamaica include the Island Traffic Authority, the Toll Authority of Jamaica, and the National Works Agency.

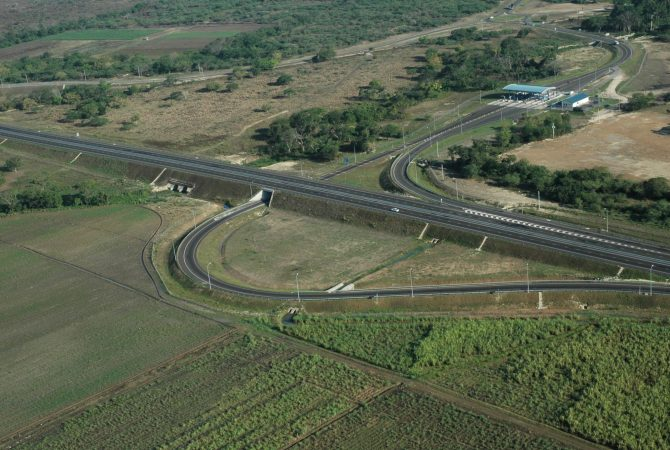
The Spanish Town interchange on the East–West toll road, part of Highway 2000.

== Roadway signage ==
Jamaica has adopted a unique blend of road signage styles consisting of the 1968 United Nations' Vienna Convention on Road Signs and Signals as well as the Manual on Uniform Traffic Control Devices of the United States.

== Motorways ==
Map of the motorways in Jamaica. The T1, T2, and T3 are highlighted, along with the planned expansion of T1 towards Montego Bay baypass

Starting in the late 1990s, the Jamaican government, in cooperation with private investors, embarked on the Highway 2000 project to build a system of motorways — the first access-controlled roads of their kind on the island. The project's ultimate goal is to link Jamaica's two main cities, Kingston and Montego Bay, along with the north coast, and has been carried out in a series of phases. The project is structured as a public–private partnership: in November 2001, the government-owned National Road Operating and Constructing Company (NROCC) signed a concession agreement with TransJamaican Highway Limited (TJH), a subsidiary of the French firm Bouygues Travaux Publics, under which TJH finances, designs, builds, operates, and maintains the highway.

Phase 1A produced the 33-kilometre (21 mi) highway from the Mandela Highway at Caymanas Park to Sandy Bay, completed in 2003, along with the upgrade of the Portmore Causeway, completed in June 2006. Phase 1B extended the road from Sandy Bay to Four Paths, opening on August 15, 2012, as the T1 Toll Road; this section includes an exit to the A1 Spanish Town Bypass roughly 9.7 km (6 mi) to 11.2 km (7 mi) from the eastern end, followed by exits to Old Harbour at 26.5 km (16.5 mi), Freetown at 30.9 km (19.2 mi), and Sandy Bay at 42.3 km (26.3 mi), before ending at a junction with the A2 at 45 km (28 mi), about 400 m (440 yd) east of Glenmuir Road, which provides access to May Pen. The remaining stretch, from Four Paths to Williamsfield, was completed in September 2023, bringing this phase to a total of 37.7 km (23.4 mi).

Phase 2A covered the corridor from Caymanas Park to Ocho Rios; its section from the Linstead Bypass to Moneague opened as the T3 on August 5, 2014, spanning 19.1 km (11.9 mi), with a planned link to the A1 (Moneague to Mount Diablo Road) at 16.5 km (10.3 mi) from Linstead still closed as of this writing. Phase 2B, covering the corridor from Mandeville to Montego Bay, remains in the general alignment planning stage — corresponding to the Montego Bay Perimeter Road Project discussed below.

On September 15, 2009, then-prime minister Bruce Golding announced to Parliament that Highway 2000 would be renamed in honour of sprinter Usain Bolt; the plan was quietly dropped after press reports that Bolt had declined the honour.

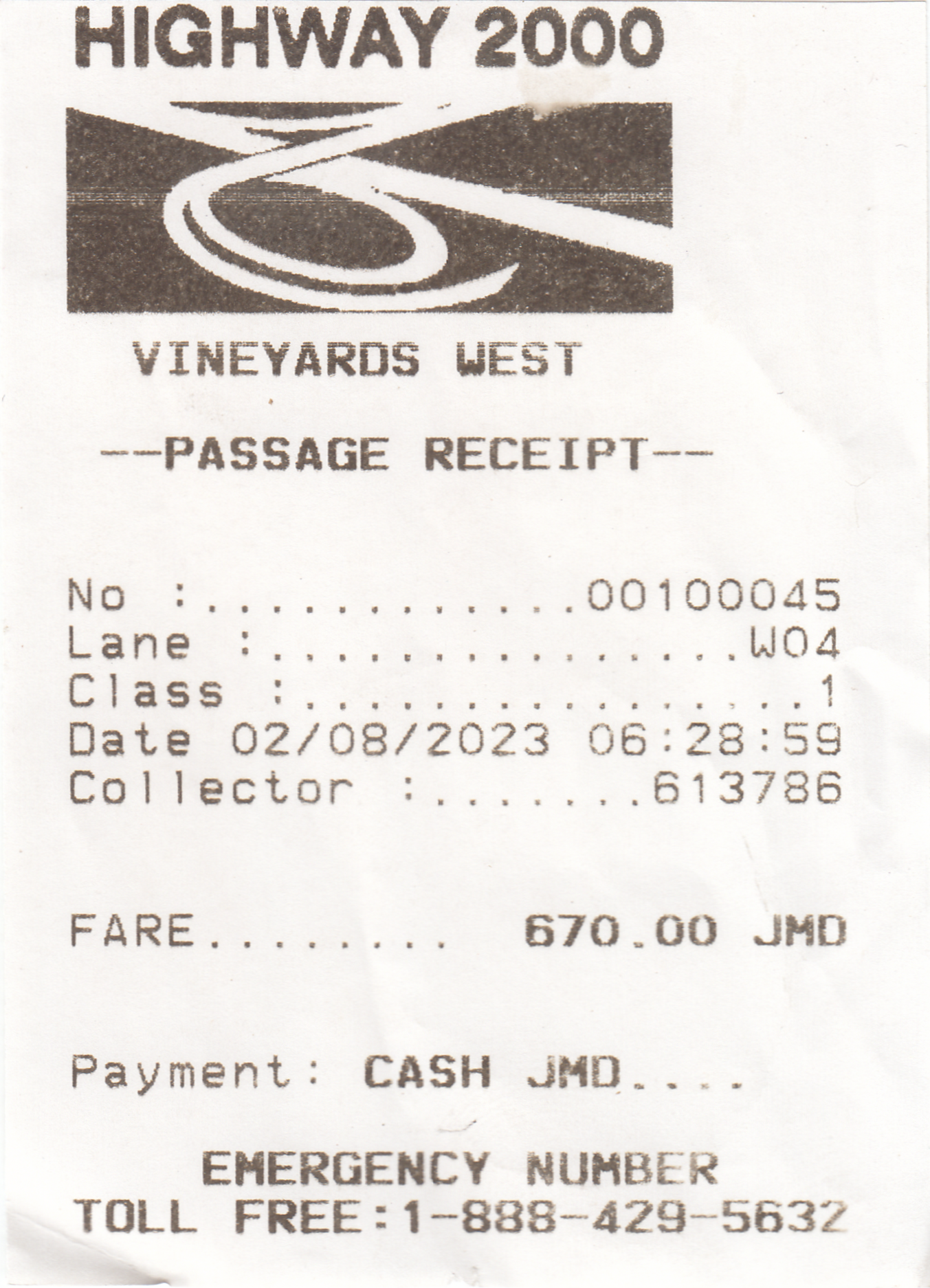
A passage receipt at Vineyards toll booth in T1 motorway

Jamaica's motorway network today consists of three tolled routes: T1, also known as the PJ Patterson Highway; T2, also known as the Portmore Toll Road; and T3, also known as the Edward Seaga Highway. Together, these routes are operated by TransJamaican Highway Limited and connect Kingston with May Pen and Williamsfield in the south, Portmore via the causeway across Hunts Bay, and Ocho Rios on the north coast.

A bypass is currently being built as an extension of T1 motorway, around Montego Bay as part of the Montego Bay Perimeter Road Project (MBPRP), the modern successor to the long-pending Phase 2B. The project consists of the Montego Bay Bypass, a 15.1 kilometres (9.4 mi) four-lane highway running from Alice Eldemire Drive/Howard Cooke Highway to Iron Shore, and the Long Hill Bypass, a further 10.5 kilometres (6.5 mi) four-lane extension connecting Montego West Village to Montpelier, together with the Montego River Bridge, expected to become the longest and tallest four-lane bridge in Jamaica. The US$354-million project is being built by China Harbour Engineering Company (CHEC) on behalf of NROCC, with the Bypass section targeted for completion by September 2026 and the Long Hill Bypass by May 2027.

In December 2025, the government announced plans to eventually extend the motorway network from its current western terminus in Williamsfield all the way to the Montego Bay Perimeter Road, passing through the parishes of Saint Elizabeth, Westmoreland, and Hanover before reaching Saint James. Officials cited Hurricane Melissa, a Category 5 storm that struck the island on October 28, 2025, as a driving factor behind the plan, noting that while the newer sections of highway had proven resilient, the lack of connectivity between major routes had complicated emergency access and recovery efforts.

== Northern Coastal Highway ==
1998, the Government of Jamaica and the European Commission signed the financing agreement for the third segment of the Northern Coastal Highway Improvement Project in the amount of €80 million. The Project involves the reconstruction and re-habilitation of approximately 96 km (60 mi) of road between Ocho Rios; St. Ann; and Port Antonio, Portland. Total cost of the project is €105.0 million with the GOJ contributing €25 million for land acquisition and re-settlement as well as the construction of three bridges along the segment.

The entire project consists of approximately 287 km (178 mi) of roadway and is divided into three segments. · Segment 1 – Negril to Montego Bay (approx. 71 km [44 mi]) · Segment 2 – Montego Bay to Ocho Rios (approx. 97 km [60 mi]) · Segment 3 – Ocho Rios to Fair Prospect (approx. 119 km [74 mi])

== Southern Coastal Highway ==
Approval has been given by Cabinet for the execution of a contract between the government and China Harbour Engineering Company Ltd. for the design, improvement and construction of Sections 1A and 1B of the Southern Coastal Highway Improvement Project. This will involve work from Harbour View to Morant Bay as part of the overall Segment from Harbour View to Port Antonio.

The existing main road along this southern coastal section of the island has been in generally poor condition. The alignment, surface condition, drainage are in need of major improvement.

The Harbour View to Morant Bay section covers some 43 km (27 mi), with Morant Bay to Port Antonio approximately 65 km (40 mi). The work on the Harbour View to Morant Bay leg is estimated to cost approximately US$385 million.

Among the improvement works will be a re alignment of the White Horses Bypass to the south of the town along the sea coast rather than to the north and modification of the Morant Bay Bypass at the western and eastern ends.

A section of the highway will also be constructed to accommodate four lanes and major structures are to be built including 16 bridges, one flyover, and one subway, along with new pipe and box culverts.

Financing for the project is through the China Exim Bank. It is being accommodated in the 5-year Public Sector Investment Programmes covering the period from 2016 to 2021.

== Toll Motorways ==
| Designation | From | To | Via | Comments | Length |
|---|---|---|---|---|---|
| T1 | Kingston | Williamsfield (Montego Bay planned) | Spanish Town - Old Harbour - May Pen - Toll Gate - Porus | East-West leg of Highway 2000; also known as the PJ Patterson Highway | 66.6 kilometres (41.4 mi) |
| T2 | Kingston | Portmore | Marcus Garvey Drive - Port Henderson Road - Dyke Road - Dawkins Drive | Also known as the Portmore Causeway or Portmore Toll Road | 6.5 kilometres (4.0 mi) |
| T3 | Kingston | Ocho Rios | Angels - Linstead - Moneague | North-South leg of Highway 2000; also known as the Edward Seaga Highway; only the Linstead Bypass–Moneague section (19.1 km) is currently open | 67 kilometres (42 mi) |

== A Roads ==
| Designation | From | To | Via | Comments | Length |
|---|---|---|---|---|---|
| A1 | Kingston | Lucea | Spanish Town - Bog Walk - Linstead - Ewarton - Moneague - Claremont - Saint Ann's Bay - Falmouth - Montego Bay | | 243 kilometres (151 mi) |
| A2 | Spanish Town | Savanna-la-Mar | Old Harbour - May Pen - Porus - Mandeville - Santa Cruz - Black River | | 154 kilometres (96 mi) |
| A3 | Kingston | Saint Ann's Bay | Castleton - A4 junction west of Annotto Bay - Port Maria - Oracabessa - Ocho Rios | | 101 kilometres (63 mi) |
| A4 | Kingston | A3 junction west of Annotto Bay | Morant Bay - Port Morant - Golden Grove - Hectors River - Manchioneal - Boston Bay - Port Antonio - Hope Bay - Buff Bay | Eastern Jamaica coast road. | 168 kilometres (104 mi) |

== B Roads ==
| Designation | From | To | Via | Comments | Length |
|---|---|---|---|---|---|
| B1 | Cross Roads | Buff Bay | Newcastle | | |
| B2 | Bog Walk | White Hall | Riversdale - Troja - Richmond - Highgate | | 37 kilometres (23 mi) |
| B3 | May Pen | Runaway Bay | | | 85 kilometres (53 mi) |
| B4 | Trout Hall | Walderston | Frankfield | | 26 kilometres (16 mi) |
| B5 | Shooters Hill | Jackson Town | Christiana - Albert Town | | 71 kilometres (44 mi) |
| B6 | Montpelier | Shooters Hill | Balaclava - Maggotty - Y.S. River | | 87 kilometres (54 mi) |
| B7 | Shettlewood | Baptist (A2 N of Black River) | Happy Grove - Newmarket - Struie | | 39 kilometres (24 mi) |
| B8 | Ferris Cross (A2 E of Savanna-la-Mar) | Reading (A1 W of Montego Bay) | Whithorn - Shettlewood - Montpelier | | 35 kilometres (22 mi) |
| B9 | Lucea | Savanna-la-Mar | Frome | | 32 kilometres (20 mi) |
| B10 | Oxford | Duncans | Clark's Town | | |
| B11 | Falmouth | Green Park (old A1 3.2 kilometres (2 mi) north of Claremont) | Clark's Town - Jackson Town - Stewart Town - Brown's Town | | 68 kilometres (42 mi) |
| B12 | Freetown (A2 E of May Pen) | Toll Gate (A2 W of May Pen) | Lionel Town | Forms a rough semi circle S of May Pen, predominantly near the coast. | |
| B13 | Linstead | Oracabessa | Guy's Hill - Gayle | | |
| B15 | Montego Bay | Falmouth | Adelphi - Wakefield - Martha Brae | | |

== See also ==
- Transport in Jamaica
