= List of airports in Jamaica =

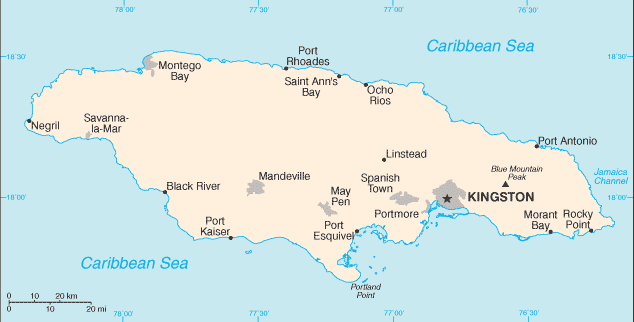
Map of Jamaica

This is a list of airports in Jamaica, grouped by type and sorted by location.

== List of airports by name ==
Names shown in bold indicate the airport has scheduled passenger service on commercial airlines.

City/town served	Parish	ICAO	IATA	Airport name	Coordinates	LID
**International airports**
Kingston	Kingston / St. Andrew	MKJP	KIN	**Norman Manley International Airport**	17°56′08″N 076°47′15″W	
Montego Bay	Saint James	MKJS	MBJ	**Sangster International Airport**	18°30′13″N 077°54′48″W	
Ocho Rios/Boscobel	Saint Mary	MKBS	OCJ	**Ian Fleming International Airport**	18°24′15″N 076°58′08″W	
**Domestic airports**
Kingston	Kingston / St. Andrew	MKTP	KTP	Tinson Pen Aerodrome	17°59′18″N 076°49′25″W	
Negril	Westmoreland	MKNG	NEG	**Negril Aerodrome**	18°20′24″N 078°20′08″W	
Port Antonio	Portland	MKKJ	POT	Ken Jones Aerodrome	18°11′55″N 076°32′04″W	
**Military airports**
Kingston	Kingston / St. Andrew			Up Park Camp	17°59′18″N 076°46′34″W	
Moneague	Saint Ann			Moneague Training Camp	18°16′56″N 077°06′18″W	JM-0015
**Private airports**
Bath	Saint Thomas			Bath Airfield	17°56′24″N 076°18′27″W	JM-0016
Bog Walk	Saint Catherine			Tulloch Airfield	18°06′15″N 076°59′20″W	JM-0003
Discovery Bay	Saint Ann			Puerto Seco Airstrip	18°28′00″N 77°23′40″W	JM-0007
Ewarton	Saint Catherine			Ewarton Airstrip	18°10′26″N 077°04′07″W	JM-0004
Manchioneal	Portland			Manchioneal Airstrip	18°03′17″N 76°17′00″W	JM-0002
Nain	Saint Elizabeth			Nain Airstrip	17°58′38″N 77°36′25″W	JM-0010
Old Harbour Bay	Saint Catherine			Port Esquivel Airstrip	17°53′30″N 77°08′10″W	JM-0006
Williamsfield	Manchester			Kirkvine Airstrip	18°04′45″N 77°28′40″W	JM-0009
Duncans	Trelawny			Braco Airfield	18°28′35″N 77°29′25″W	JM-0012
**Closed**
Spanish Town	Saint Catherine			Caymanas Airfield	18°00′52″N 076°55′27″W	Closed
Vernam Field	Clarendon			Vernam Field	17°53′18″N 077°18′11″W	Closed
Rocky Point	Clarendon			Rocky Point Airstrip	17°46′37″N 077°15′36″W	Closed
Mandeville	Manchester		MVJ	Marlboro Airport (Marlborough Airport)	18°01′11″N 077°29′42″W	Closed

== See also ==
- Transport in Jamaica
- List of airports by ICAO code: M#MK - Jamaica
- Wikipedia: WikiProject Aviation/Airline destination lists: North America#Jamaica
