= T1 road (Jamaica) =

Highway in Jamaica

T1
- PJ Patterson Highway
- T1 highlighted in blue

Route information
- Maintained by TransJamaican Highway Limited / Jamaica Infrastructure Operators
- Length: 66 km (41 mi)
- Existed: 2003–present
- History: Completed in phases from 2003 to 2023; latest phase (May Pen–Williamsfield, past Porus) opened September 14, 2023

Major junctions
- West end: A2 near Porus, Manchester
- A1 (Spanish Town Bypass) near Spanish Town; Old Harbour; Freetown; Sandy Bay
- East end: Mandela Highway near Central Village, Saint Catherine

Location
- Country: Jamaica
- Parishes: Saint Catherine, Clarendon, Manchester

Highway system
- Roads in Jamaica
→ T2

T1, officially the PJ Patterson Highway, named after former Jamaican prime minister P. J. Patterson, is a tolled controlled-access highway forming the East–West Leg of Highway 2000, Jamaica's ongoing national highway development project. The highway runs for approximately 45 kilometres (28 mi) between the Mandela Highway near Kingston and a junction with the A2 near May Pen, in the parish of Clarendon. T1 is one of three component legs of the Highway 2000 project, alongside the Portmore Causeway (T2) and the Edward Seaga Highway (T3).

T1 was built in phases. The first phase, from Mandela Highway to Sandy Bay (33 km), opened in 2003, followed by the upgrade of the Portmore Causeway, completed in June 2006. A further phase extended the highway from Sandy Bay to May Pen, opening on August 15, 2012. A later extension, the May Pen–Williamsfield leg of the Southern Coastal Highway Improvement Project, running further west through Four Paths and past Porus toward Williamsfield, was officially opened on September 14, 2023, by Prime Minister Andrew Holness. Although open to traffic, this section remained toll-free at opening, with tolling initially scheduled to begin at the end of 2023. The highway is a four-to-six-lane controlled-access, tolled motorway with grade-separated interchanges, and is operated by TransJamaican Highway Limited under a concession agreement.

== History ==
The Highway 2000 project, of which T1 forms the initial leg, was conceived in the late 1990s under the administration of Prime Minister P. J. Patterson as one of the government's "Millennium Projects," and Patterson formally launched the project in September 1999. An international tender for the East–West Leg was held in 2001 and won by the French contractor Bouygues Travaux Publics, in partnership with the toll operator Vinci, under a build-own-operate-transfer public–private partnership.

T1 was built in phases. The first section, from the Mandela Highway to Bushy Park, opened in 2003 as Jamaica's first modern tolled highway, and was extended to Sandy Bay by 2004. The Portmore Causeway (T2) was brought into the concession in July 2006. A further phase, from Sandy Bay to May Pen, was completed on August 15, 2012. A later extension, running further west through Four Paths and past Porus to Williamsfield, opened on September 14, 2023.

The financing arrangement negotiated with Bouygues placed a substantial long-term burden on the Jamaican government: under the concession agreement, toll revenues from the highway go toward repaying the loans taken on by the state-owned National Road Operating and Constructing Company (NROCC) before any proceeds reach the government. In recognition of his role in initiating the project, the East–West Leg was later named the PJ Patterson Highway in his honor.

== Route description ==
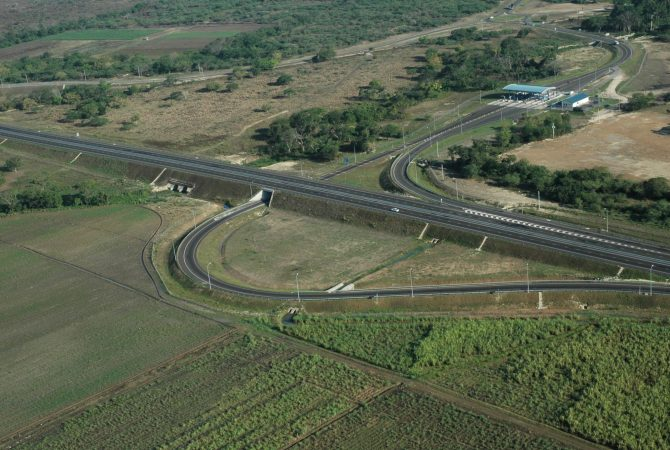
The Spanish Town Interchange on T1

T1 begins at an interchange with the Mandela Highway near Central Village, in the parish of Saint Catherine. Heading west, the highway passes the Spanish Town Interchange, providing access to Spanish Town via the A1 (Spanish Town Bypass), before passing Old Harbour and Freetown. West of Freetown, the highway crosses into the parish of Clarendon, passing near Sandy Bay before reaching the outskirts of May Pen.

In May Pen, the highway reaches the Mineral Heights/Halse Hall interchange, on the Alexander Bustamante Highway (A2). West of May Pen, T1 continues through the community of Toll Gate, meeting the Four Path–Toll Gate Road, before entering the parish of Manchester near Porus. T1 terminates at the Melrose Hill Bypass, an interchange with the A2/B5 just north of Porus, from which the A2 continues toward Williamsfield and Mandeville. In total, T1 runs for approximately 66 kilometres (41 mi) across the three parishes.

The highway is a four-to-six-lane, tolled, controlled-access motorway with grade-separated interchanges, and numerous toll plazas.

== Interchanges ==
The entire route is located in the parishes of Saint Catherine, Clarendon and Manchester.

T1 motorway
Parish	Town	mi	km	Destinations	Notes
Manchester	Porus	0.00	0.0	A2 – Porus, Williamsfield	Western terminus; continues as Melrose Hill Bypass
Clarendon	Clarendon Park	7.27	11.7	Local street towards Toll Gate town and Clarendon Park	Toll at the entrance on local street and toll on the road
Clarendon	May Pen	14.04	22.6	A2 – May Pen	
Clarendon		14.54	23.4		Bridge over the Rio Minho
Clarendon	Mineral Heights	16.28	26.2	May Pen -Lionel Town Road	East-west exit only and east-west entrance only
Clarendon	Sandy Bay	16.53	26.6	May Pen toll plaza	Immediately after the intersection in Mineral Heights
Saint Catherine	Freetown	23.25	37.4	A2 – Old Harbour, Sandy Bay	Partial connection
Saint Catherine	Old Harbour	25.48	41.0	South Street – Old Harbour Bay Road	
Saint Catherine	Vineyards	27.90	44.9	Vineyards toll plaza	
Saint Catherine	Spanish Town	35.30	56.8	Hill Run Road	Westbound exit only, eastbound entry only
Saint Catherine	Spanish Town	35.68	57.4	Access road to Spanish Town Bypass (A1 – A2)	Exit ramp toward Spanish Town has a toll; T1 mainline is toll-free at this point
Saint Catherine	Portmore	41.08	66.1		Entrance from Dyke Road and exit from Lakes Pen Road
Saint Catherine	Central Village	41.39	66.6	A1 – Spanish Town, Kingston	Eastern terminus, continues as the Mandela Highway
1.000 mi = 1.609 km; 1.000 km = 0.621 mi Incomplete access · Toll
