= Braco Airfield =

- IATA: none; ICAO: none

Summary
- Airport type: Private
- Serves: Rio Bueno, Jamaica
- Elevation AMSL: 18 ft / 5 m
- Coordinates: 18°28′35″N 77°29′25″W

Map
- Location of the airport in Jamaica

Runways
Direction	Length		Surface
Direction	m	ft	Surface
07/25	1,065	3,494	Grass
- Source: OurAirports Google Maps

Braco Airfield is a coastal airstrip between Rio Bueno and Duncans in the Trelawny Parish of Jamaica. The airstrip is 1 kilometre (0.6 mi) west of the Meliá Braco Village resort.

There are low hills west of the runway. East approach and departure may be over the water.

The Sangster VOR/DME (Ident: SIA) is located 24.5 nautical miles (45 km) west of the airstrip.

== See also ==
- Transport in Jamaica
- List of airports in Jamaica
