= Kirkvine Airstrip =

- IATA: none; ICAO: none; LID: JM-0009

Summary
- Airport type: Private
- Serves: Mandeville, Jamaica
- Elevation AMSL: 1,368 ft / 417 m
- Coordinates: 18°04′45″N 77°28′40″W

Map
- Location of the airport in Jamaica

Runways
Direction	Length		Surface
Direction	m	ft	Surface
15/33	640	2,100	Asphalt
- Source: OurAirports Google Maps

Kirkvine Airstrip is an airstrip serving the city of Mandeville in the Manchester Parish of Jamaica. The airstrip is 5 kilometres (3.1 mi) north of the city.

There is rising terrain northwest through east. There is a large hill off the end of Runway 33.

The Manley VOR/DME (Ident: MLY) is located 41.0 nautical miles (75.9 km) east of the airstrip. The Sangster VOR/DME (Ident: SIA) is located 35.9 nautical miles (66.5 km) northwest of the airstrip.

== See also ==
- Transport in Jamaica
- List of airports in Jamaica
