= Port Esquivel Airstrip =

- IATA: none; ICAO: none; LID: JM-0006

Summary
- Airport type: Private
- Serves: Old Harbour, Jamaica
- Elevation AMSL: 3 ft / 1 m
- Coordinates: 17°53′30″N 77°08′10″W

Map
- Location of the airport in Jamaica

Runways
Direction	Length		Surface
Direction	m	ft	Surface
14/32	650	2,133	Asphalt
- Source: OurAirports Google Maps

Port Esquivel Airstrip is an airstrip serving the town of Old Harbour in the Saint Catherine Parish of Jamaica. The airstrip is 6 kilometres (3.7 mi) southwest of Old Harbour.

South approach and departure are over the water.

The Manley VOR/DME (Ident: MLY) is located 20.6 nautical miles (38.2 km) east of the airstrip.

== See also ==
- Transport in Jamaica
- List of airports in Jamaica
