= Manchioneal Airstrip =

Airstrip in Manchioneal, Jamaica

Manchioneal Airstrip Hectors River Airstrip
- IATA: none; ICAO: none; LID: JM-0002

Summary
- Airport type: Private
- Serves: Manchioneal, Jamaica
- Elevation AMSL: 53 ft / 16 m
- Coordinates: 18°03′17″N 76°17′00″W

Map
- Location of the airport in Jamaica

Runways
Direction	Length		Surface
Direction	m	ft	Surface
13/31	430	1,411	Grass
- Source: OurAirports Google Maps

Manchioneal Airstrip is an airstrip serving the Caribbean coastal town of Manchioneal in the Portland Parish of Jamaica. The airstrip is 1 kilometre (0.62 mi) northwest of Manchioneal.

There is gently rising terrain immediately to the northwest. East approach and departure are over the water.

The Manley VOR/DME (Ident: MLY) is located 29.2 nautical miles (54.1 km) west-southwest of the runway.

== See also ==
- Transport in Jamaica
- List of airports in Jamaica
