= Nain Airstrip =

- IATA: none; ICAO: none; LID: JM-0010

Summary
- Airport type: Private
- Owner: Alpart
- Serves: Nain, Jamaica
- Elevation AMSL: 550 ft / 168 m
- Coordinates: 17°58′38″N 77°36′25″W

Map
- Location of the airport in Jamaica

Runways
Direction	Length		Surface
Direction	m	ft	Surface
12/30	500	1,640	Gravel
- Source: OurAirports Google Maps

Nain Airstrip is an airstrip serving the town of Nain and the Alpart alumina refinery in the Saint Elizabeth Parish of Jamaica. The airstrip is 2 kilometres (1.2 mi) northwest of Nain.

There is distant high terrain east of the airstrip.

The Sangster VOR/DME (Ident: SIA) is located 36.3 nautical miles (67.2 km) north-northwest of the runway.

== See also ==
- Transport in Jamaica
- List of airports in Jamaica
