= Bath Airfield =

Small Jamaican aerodrome

Hector’s River
- IATA: none; ICAO: none; LID: JM-0016

Summary
- Airport type: Private
- Serves: Bath, Saint Thomas Parish, Jamaica
- Elevation AMSL: 84 ft / 26 m
- Coordinates: 17°56′25″N 76°18′25″W

Map
- Location of the airport in Jamaica

Runways
Direction	Length		Surface
Direction	m	ft	Surface
09/27	910	2,986	Grass
- Sources: OurAirports Google Maps

Hector's River Airstrip (Local ID code: JM-0016) is an airstrip serving Bath, a village in the Saint Thomas Parish of Jamaica.

The runway is 4 kilometres (2.5 mi) east of Bath.

The Manley VOR/DME (Ident: MLY) is located 26.9 nautical miles (49.8 km) west of the airfield.

== See also ==
- Transport in Jamaica
- List of airports in Jamaica
