= Linval =

Linval is a given name for males. People named Linval include:

- Prince Jazzbo, born Linval Roy Carter, Jamaican reggae and dancehall DJ and producer
- Linval Dixon, Jamaican footballer
- Linval Joseph, American football defensive tackle
- Linval Laird, retired Jamaican athlete who specialised in the 400 metres
- Linval Thompson, Jamaican reggae and dub musician and record producer
