= Byron Lee =

Jamaican musician (1935–2008)

The Honourable Byron Lee OJ, CD
- Also known as: The Dragon
- Born: Byron Aloysius St. Elmo Lee; 27 June 1935; Christiana, Manchester, Jamaica
- Origin: Christiana, Jamaica
- Died: 4 November 2008 (aged 73) Kingston, Jamaica
- Genres: Ska; rocksteady; reggae; calypso; soca; mas
- Instrument: Bass guitar
- Formerly of: Byron Lee and the Dragonaires

Byron Lee OJ, CD, born Byron Aloysius St. Elmo Lee (27 June 1935 – 4 November 2008), was a Jamaican musician, record producer, and entrepreneur, best known for his work as leader of Byron Lee and the Dragonaires.

== Biography ==
Lee was born in Christiana, Manchester Parish, Jamaica, to a mixed-race Chinese-Jamaican mother, Evelyn Chung, and a Chinese father, Oscar Lee, a language teacher originally from Kowloon, Hong Kong. The family moved to the Mountain View Gardens area of Kingston when Lee was around 8 or 9 years old. He learned to play piano at a convent school in Mandeville, but put music on hold when he was selected to the Jamaica national football team. He taught himself to play bass on a homemade instrument, and around 1950, along with his friend Carl Brady, he formed the first incarnation of the Dragonaires, named after the college football team that they played for, at that time concentrating on mento. The band turned professional in 1956 and went on to become one of Jamaica's leading ska bands, continuing since and taking in other genres such as calypso, soca, and Mas.

Byron Lee is known to have introduced the electric bass guitar to Jamaica in late 1959 or 1960. However, the reason Lee began to use the electric bass as opposed to the double bass had nothing to do with sound. Rather, it was a way for Lee to avoid carrying the large and heavy double bass to the truck to move from gig to gig. The bass guitar gained popularity throughout the country and soon became the standard. The electric bass's louder, clearer, and more in-your-face sound soon changed the sound of Jamaican music entirely, especially after Skatalites bassist Lloyd Brevett took a liking to it.

He and his band, The Dragonaires, are featured in the first James Bond movie, Dr. No, set in and around Kingston, Jamaica in 1962. They are prominently seen, playing "Jamaica Jump Up" on the bandstand at Pussfeller's calypso bar.

Lee also worked as a producer, producing many of the ska singles by The Maytals, and his entrepreneurial skills led to him setting up the Byron Lee's Spectacular Show tour, which involved several Jamaican acts (including The Maytals) touring the Caribbean. He also became the head of distribution in Jamaica for Atlantic Records. Lee purchased the West Indies Records Limited (WIRL) recording studios from Edward Seaga after fire had destroyed the pressing plant on the same site, and renamed it Dynamic Sounds, soon having a new pressing facility built on the site. It soon became one of the best-equipped studios in the Caribbean, attracting both local and international recording artists, including Paul Simon and The Rolling Stones, who recorded their famous song "Angie" there. Lee's productions included Boris Gardiner's Reggae Happening, Hopeton Lewis's Grooving Out on Life, and The Slickers' "Johnny Too Bad". Dynamic also acts as one of Jamaica's leading record distributors.

In 1990, Lee inaugurated what became an annual event, Jamaica Carnival, held on Constant Spring Road, and attended by hundreds of thousands of people that united the "uptown" and "downtown" residents of Kingston, an event that Lee called "the happiest moment in my life". Lee had performed with the Dragonaires at carnivals around the Caribbean since the mid-1970s, and chose the location for the carnival to attract revellers from all of Jamaica's classes, stating: "The biggest problem was that most Jamaicans said it wouldn't work, that it isn't a carnival country, but I persisted 'cause I believed in it. I wanted carnival to go to the public. You always had other carnivals that were held mostly indoor, where persons had to pay to get in. I went to the people and choose Half-Way Tree where uptown and downtown meet. That is where the route will remain". In the early days of ska, Lee was credited in taking it from the ghettos and giving it appeal among Jamaica's "uptown" middle and upper classes. He has also been credited with taking soca in the opposite direction, popularising a genre that had previously only been enjoyed in Jamaica among the upper classes, with the island's working class.

Lee missed the Jamaica Carnival in 2007 as he was receiving treatment for bladder cancer after having surgery in Florida, and no longer appeared on stage with the Dragonaires, although he was still involved in the band's management, and was involved with the festival again in 2008. A concert was held in his honour on 30 June 2007, to celebrate his 50 years in the music industry, with artists performing including fellow cancer survivors Myrna Hague and Pluto Shervington. Proceeds went to the Jamaica Cancer Society.

Lee was awarded the Order of Distinction in 1982, upgraded to Commander level on 15 October 2007, in recognition of his "contribution in the fields of Music and Entertainment both locally and internationally".

== Death ==
In October 2008, after receiving treatment for several weeks in Florida, Lee returned to spend his final days in Jamaica. In a ceremony at the University Hospital of the West Indies on 26 October 2008, he was awarded the Order of Jamaica (OJ). Lee died from bladder cancer in Kingston on 4 November 2008, aged 73. In a statement on the day of Lee's death, the Prime Minister of Jamaica, Bruce Golding, said: "Jamaica, and indeed the world, has lost another great music pioneer with the passing this morning of Byron Lee, one of the greatest band leaders ever to grace the entertainment stages of the world".
