= Charly Black =

Musical artist

- Born: 6 April 1980 (age 46); Rio Bueno, Trelawny Parish, Jamaica
- Occupations: Singer; musician
- Children: 6
- Musical career
- Genres: Reggae; dancehall; reggae fusion; soca
- Instruments: Vocals
- Years active: 2004–present
- Labels: Unstoppable Entertainment; Pop Style Music; Allezgo productions

Desmond Méndez (born 6 April 1980), better known as Charly Black, alternatively known as Charly Blacks, and originally known as Tony Mentol, is a Jamaican reggae and dancehall singer, selector and singjay. He is best known for his track "Gyal You a Party Animal", which became popular outside Jamaica in regions including Mexico, South America, and Spain. The song was a hit in these regions, as well as in some parts of the Caribbean and Central America. It is also one of the most watched dancehall videos on YouTube with over 238 million views as of February 2022. Other songs include "Whine & Kotch" Feat. J Capri, "Girlfriend", "Bike Back", and "Hoist & Wine". Mendez has also collaborated with other music artists, including his collaboration with American Latin pop star Jencarlos Canela in the single "Pa Que Me Invitan".

== Life and career ==
Desmond Mendez was born in Rio Bueno, Jamaica on 6 April 1980. He started his ascent at singing competitions at the age of five. He attended Rio Bueno Primary and High School.

Mendez has been part of the Warlord International and Bass Odyssey sound systems. He made his recorded debut in 2004 with the single "Woman It's You". He eventually switched aliases to Charly Black and recorded a string of cuts for labels like Coppershot, M Bass, and VP, the last of which issued "Buddy Buddy" in 2008. in the year 2012 With the label of Head Concussion Records (company of the Jamaican producer Rvssian) he releases the song "Whine & Kotch" with the singer J Capri, having a great acceptance in the world of dancehall and being one of the most recognized songs of it. In 2014, he recorded his most successful single, "Gyal You a Party Animal", then simply known as "Party Animal". The song, based on Kurt Riley's Jambe-An riddim, gradually spread outside Jamaica to win over audiences across South America. It was licensed worldwide by Allezgo Productions and for the US by Casablanca Records in early 2016, followed by the release of a music video for the song on YouTube months later. It has since received over 100 million streams on Spotify.

The song has also been remixed by other foreign music artists, including Maluma, Daddy Yankee, and Jillionaire. However, Maluma announced via Instagram that he was unable to launch his remixed version due to legal rights issues.

=== Live performances ===
In May 2016, he performed in Victoria, Seychelles, and was warmly welcomed by critics.

Since the critical success of "Gyal You a Party Animal" later that year, Mendez has been more active on live performing. In October 2016, he made a live performance in Mexico, performing such songs including his signature "Gyal You a Party Animal", as well as Hoist & Wine. This performance was sponsored by the Hispanic Radio Network and station Los 40. He also appeared in San José, Costa Rica on 2 December of the same year, where "Gyal You a Party Animal" was certified Diamond in Central America, making him the first Jamaican music artist to be Diamond-awarded in the said region. In August 2024 he performed at Ruhr Reggae Summer (Mülheim an der Ruhr).

== Discography ==
=== Studio albums ===
- No Excuses (2023)

=== Compilation albums ===
- Multi-Talented (2013)
- Rio Bueno (2021)

=== EPs ===
- Best Whine Riddim (featuring Kooly Chat) (2011)

=== Singles ===
- "Woman It's You" (2004)
- "Buddy Buddy" (2008)
- "Rich This Year" (2009)
- "Fall in Love Again" (2010)
- "Whine & Kotch" (2012)
- "Too Blessed" (2012)
- "Bubble Dung" (2013)
- "Jamaican Everyday" (2014)
- "Bike Back" (2014)
- "Gyal You a Party Animal" (2015)
- "Energy Girls" (2015)
- "Girlfriend" (2016)
- "Hoist & Wine" (2016)
- "Big Bumper" (2016)
- "Just Do It" (2016)
- "Bruk Out" (2016)
- "Often" (2016)
- "VIP Girl" (2017)
- "Sidung" (2020)
- "Charly" (2021)

=== Collaborations ===
- "Pa Que Me Invitan" (with Jencarlos Canela) (2016)
- "Me lloras" (with Gloria Trevi) (2018)
