= Indecka =

- Born: Chevol Grant
- Origin: Kingston, Jamaica
- Genres: Reggae/Dancehall
- Occupations: Singer, Songwriter
- Years active: 2003–present
- Labels: Indecka music

Chevol Grant, better known by his stage name Indecka, is a Jamaican reggae and dancehall singer and songwriter. He is a follower of the Rastafarian Faith.

== Early life and career ==
Indecka was raised by his grandmother in Kingston, Jamaica. Indecka began singing at the age of 5. By age 15, he was writing poetry, and shortly after he began putting melodies to his written words.

In 2002 Indecka met Michael "Jah Mikes" Bell, the head producer at Yahbell Entertainment, and shortly after recorded his first song "Always Be There" for him. Since then, he has recorded for various producers, including Jami Dread from the Austria-based Lyrical Wars Records. In 2008 he started working with Julius "Zege" Mitchell, a producer/engineer for Sweat Boxx Productions out of Greater Portmore in Saint Catherine Parish, Jamaica. While working with Zege, Indecka began performing on various stage shows including the annual Sting music festival in 2009.

Indecka has released songs like "Rice and Peas"; "Jah Protect Me"; and "The Summer is on Again" across genres of music including Reggae and Dancehall.
