= Ewarton Airstrip =

- IATA: none; ICAO: none; LID: JM-0004

Summary
- Airport type: Private
- Serves: Ewarton, Jamaica
- Elevation AMSL: 600 ft / 183 m
- Coordinates: 18°10′25″N 77°04′10″W

Map
- Location of the airport in Jamaica

Runways
Direction	Length		Surface
Direction	m	ft	Surface
07/25	640	2,100	Asphalt
- Source: OurAirports Google Maps

Ewarton Airstrip is an airstrip serving the town of Ewarton and the WINDALCO bauxite mine in the Saint Catherine Parish of Jamaica.

There is distant rising terrain to the northwest.

The Manley VOR/DME (Ident: MLY) is located 22.1 nautical miles (40.9 km) southeast of the runway.

== See also ==
- Transport in Jamaica
- List of airports in Jamaica
