= Williamsfield =

Williamsfield may refer to places:

== In the United States ==
- Williamsfield, Illinois
- Williamsfield, Ohio
- Williamsfield Township, Ashtabula County, Ohio

== Elsewhere ==
- Williamsfield, Jamaica
