= Puerto Seco Airstrip =

- IATA: none; ICAO: none; LID: JM-0007

Summary
- Airport type: Public
- Serves: Discovery Bay, Jamaica
- Elevation AMSL: 30 ft / 9 m
- Coordinates: 18°28′00″N 77°23′40″W

Map
- Location of the airport in Jamaica

Runways
Direction	Length		Surface
Direction	m	ft	Surface
07/25	575	1,886	Grass
- Source: OurAirports Google Maps

Puerto Seco Airstrip is an airstrip serving the town of Discovery Bay in the Saint Ann Parish of Jamaica.

Northeast approach and departure are over the Caribbean.

The Sangster VOR/DME (Ident: SIA) is located 30.2 nautical miles (55.9 km) west of the runway.

== See also ==
- Transport in Jamaica
- List of airports in Jamaica
