= Tulloch Airfield =

- IATA: none; ICAO: none; LID: JM-0003

Summary
- Airport type: Private
- Serves: Bog Walk, Jamaica
- Elevation AMSL: 300 ft / 91 m
- Coordinates: 18°06′15″N 76°59′20″W

Map
- Location of the airport in Jamaica

Runways
Direction	Length		Surface
Direction	m	ft	Surface
08/26	540	1,772	Grass
- Source: OurAirports Google Maps

Tulloch Airfield is an airstrip serving the town of Bog Walk in the Saint Catherine Parish of Jamaica.

There is high terrain south through east of the airstrip.

The Kingston non-directional beacon (Ident: KIN) is located 10.5 nautical miles (19.4 km) southeast of Tulloch Airfield. The Manley VOR/DME (Ident: MLY) is located 15.9 nautical miles (29.4 km) southeast of the runway.

== See also ==
- Transport in Jamaica
- List of airports in Jamaica
