= Jamaica Urban Transit Company =

Public transport service

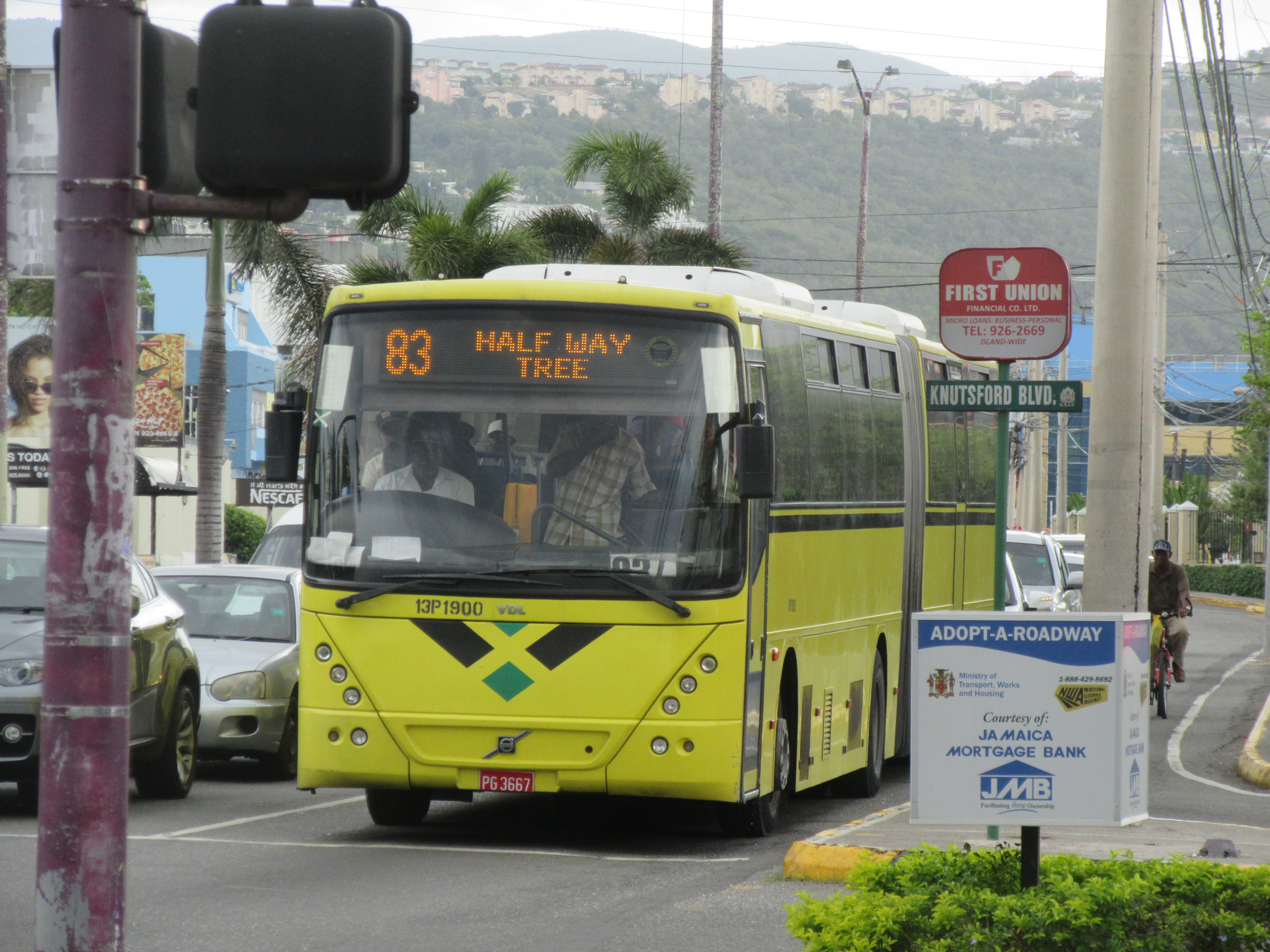
- JUTC bus in 2016
- Founded: 1999
- Headquarters: Spanish Town Depot
- Locale: Jamaica
- Service area: Kingston; Spanish Town; Portmore; Ocho Rios (minor services); Montego Bay (minor services)
- Service type: Bus rapid transit Light rail transit (planned)
- Hubs: Half Way Tree Transport Centre, Half Way Tree; North, West and South Parades, Kingston
- Stations: +5
- Fleet: +400
- Daily ridership: +100,000 (daily)
- Operator: Government of Jamaica
- Chief executive: Colin Fagan
- Website: https://jutc.gov.jm

The Jamaica Urban Transit Company (JUTC) is a public transport service operating within the Kingston Metropolitan Transport Region (KMTR), Spanish Town and Portmore owned by the Jamaican Government.

The company is headquartered in Spanish Town with its primary hubs being: Half Way Tree Transport Centre (in Half Way Tree, Saint Andrew); North, West and South Parades (NWS Parades) in Downtown, Kingston; and the Spanish Town Bus Terminal. Other main terminals/areas utilised by the JUTC include Papine, New Kingston, Cross Roads, Portmore Downtown and Spanish Town.

The Jamaica Urban Transit Company now has a fleet of approximately 400 buses. The buses are yellow with the Jamaican flag on the front of the bus. The older fleets are white and are currently being phased out. The buses had drivers and conductors to collect fare; however, with the new fleet in 2009, the roles of the conductor were merged with that of the driver. The buses now have automatic fare collection machines as of 2013, with the intention to implement a cash-less system. The JUTC also compete with the privately owned route buses and taxis; which operate on sub-franchised routes provided by the company. Legally, the JUTC is the only provider of transit services in the KMTR.

== Operations ==
The Jamaica Urban Transit Company operates over 70 routes across Kingston, Portmore and Spanish Town. Routes also travel to Clarendon and sub-suburban Saint Catherine. The company launched an Express Service operating on a different schedule and different fare structure.

=== Fares ===
==== Regular and Shuttle Services ====
Fare Class	Fare Type	Fare (JA$)	Previous Fare (JA$) prior to fare increase as of September 2014
Children (0–3)	Concession	Free	Free
Children (4–18) (in uniform); Disabled Individuals (with ID)	Concession	30.00	20.00
Children (4–18)	Full Fare	100.00	100.00
Adults; Senior Citizens (without ID)	Full Fare	100.00	100.00
Senior Citizens (with ID)	Concession	40.00	20.00

==== Express and Premium Services ====
Fare Class	Fare Type	Fare (JA$)	Previous Fare (JA$) prior to fare increase in September 2013
Children	Full Fare	160.00 (within Kingston); 200.00	90.00 (within Kingston); 100.00
Adults	Full Fare		90.00 (within Kingston); 100.00
Senior Citizens	Full Fare		90.00 (within Kingston); 100.00

=== Routes ===
The Jamaica Urban Transit Company operates three bus systems: Regular, Shuttles and Express.

==== Regular Routes ====
Route	Start	Via	End
1	Downtown	Marcus Garvey Drive, Portmore Toll Road, Naggo Head	Hellshire
1A	Half Way Tree	Hagley Park Road; Three Miles; Portmore Toll Road, Naggo Head	Hellshire
3	Downtown	Marcus Garvey Drive; Portmore Toll Road; Waterford Parkway, Passage Fort Drive; Gregory Park	Christian Gardens
3A	Half Way Tree	Hagley Park Road; Three Miles; Portmore Toll Road; Waterford Parkway; Passage Fort Drive; Gregory Park	Christian Gardens
3C	Downtown	Spanish Town Road; Three Miles; Portmore Toll Road; Waterford Parkway; Passage Fort Drive; Gregory Park	Christian Gardens
4	Cross Roads	Marescaux Road; Downtown; Marcus Garvey Drive; Portmore Toll Road; Waterford Parkway;Gregory Park	Christian Gardens
5	Downtown	Marcus Garvey Drive; Portmore Toll Road; Passage Fort Drive	Caribbean Estate
5A	Half Way Tree	Hagley Park Road; Three Miles; Portmore Toll Road; Passage Fort Drive	Caribbean Estate
6	Greater Portmore	Braeton Road; Naggo Head; Passage Fort Drive; Gregory Park; Mandela Highway;	Spanish Town
6A	Portmore Mall	Passage Fort Drive; Gregory Park; Mandela Highway;	Spanish Town
7	Downtown	Marcus Garvey Drive; Portmore Toll	Waterford
7A	Half Way Tree	Hagley Park Road, Three Miles, Portmore Toll	Waterford
8	Downtown	Marcus Garvey Drive; Portmore Toll Road; Westchester; Garveymeade	Naggo Head
8A	Half Way Tree	Hagley Park Road; Three Miles; Portmore Toll Road; Westchester; Garveymeade	Naggo Head
12	Downtown	Marcus Garvey Drive; Portmore Toll Road;Cumberland	Naggo Head
12A	Half Way Tree	Hagley Park Road; Three Miles; Portmore Toll Road, Cumberland	Naggo Head
13	Caribbean Maritime University	Sir Florizel Glasspolle Highway; Downtown; Portmore Toll Road; Marcus Garvey Drive; Portmore Toll; Naggo Head	Greater Portmore
15A	Cross Roads	Half Way Tree; Dunrobin Avenue; Washington Boulevard; Mandela Highway; Gregory Park; Newland Road; Monza/Daytona	Greater Portmore
16	Cross Roads	Marescaux Road; Marcus Garvey Drive;Portmore Toll Road; Naggo Head; Braeton Pkwy; Monza/Daytona	Greater Portmore
16A	Cross Roads	Half Way Tree; Dunrobin Avenue; Washington Boulevard; Mandela Highway; Gregory Park;Naggo Head	Greater Portmore
16B	Constant Spring	Dunrobin Avenue; Washington Boulevard; Mandela Highway; Gregory Park; Naggo Head	Greater Portmore
17	Downtown	Marcus Garvey Drive; Portmore Toll Road; Naggo Head	Greater Portmore
17A	Half Way Tree	Hagley Park Road; Three Miles; Portmore Toll Road; Naggo Head	Greater Portmore
18	Downtown	Marcus Garvey Drive; Portmore Toll road; Naggo Head; Braeton Road	Greater Portmore
18A	Half Way Tree	Hagley Park Road; Three Miles; Portmore Toll Road; Naggo Head; Braeton Road	Greater Portmore
19	UWI Backgate	Papine; Liguanea; Half Way Tree, Hagley Park Road, Three Miles, Portmore Toll, Naggo Head	Greater Portmore
20	Downtown	Marcus Garvey Drive; Portmore Toll Road; Portmore Pines;Monza/Daytona	Greater Portmore
20A	Half Way Tree	Hagley Park Road; Three Miles; Portmore Toll Road; Portmore Pines; Monza/Daytona	Greater Portmore
20C	Downtown	Spanish Town Rd; Three Miles; Portmore Toll Road; Portmore Pines, Monza/Daytona	Greater Portmore
21	Half Way Tree	Molynes Road; Washington Boulevard; Mandela Highway	Spanish Town
21B	Cross Roads	Half Way Tree; Molynes Road; Washington Boulevard; Mandela Highway	Spanish Town
22	Downtown	Spanish Town Road; Three Miles; Mandela Highway	Spanish Town
22A	Downtown	Marcus Garvey Drive; Three Miles; Spanish Town Road; Mandela Highway	Spanish Town
23A	Half Way Tree	Dunrobin Avenue; Washington Boulevard; Mandela Highway	Spanish Town
26	Half Way Tree	Hagley Park Road; Three Miles; Spanish Town Road; Mandela Highway	Spanish Town
27	Kitson Town	St John's Road	Spanish Town
30	Downtown	Spanish Town Road; Waltham Park Road; Molynes Road; Washington Boulevard; Pembroke Hall	Chancery Street
31	Downtown	Spanish Town Road; Three Miles; Weymouth Drive; Duhaney Drive; Perkins Boulevard	Chancery Street
31A	Downtown	Marcus Garvey Drive; Three Miles; Weymouth Drive; Duhaney Drive; Perkins Boulevard	Chancery Street
32	Downtown	Cross Roads; Half Way Tree; Dunrobin Avenue; Washington Boulevard; Duhaney Park	Coorville Gardens
32B	Half Way Tree (North Odeon)	Dunrobin Avenue; Washington Boulevard; Patrick City	Duhaney Park
33	Downtown	Slipe Pen Road; Lyndhurst Road; Half Way Tree; Dunrobin Avenue; Washington Boulevard, Six Miles	Ferry
44	Downtown	Cross Roads; Half Way Tree; Red Hills Road; Whitehall Avenue; Havendale	Great House Circle
46	Downtown	Cross Roads; Half Way Tree; Dunrobin Avenue;Red Hills Road; Chancery Street; Meadowbrook;	Great House Circle
47	Downtown	Slipe Pen Road; Lyndhurst Road; Half Way Tree; Molynes Road;	Chancery Street
49	Downtown	Cross Roads; Half Way Tree; Shortwood Road	Norbrook
50A	Half Way Tree	Hagley Park Road; Three Miles; Spanish Town Road	Seaview Gardens
50B	Downtown	Marcus Garvey Drive; Three Miles; Spanish Town Road	Seaview Gardens
52	Downtown	Cross Roads; Half Way Tree; Constant Spring; Stony Hill	Golden Spring
52A	Downtown	Cross Roads; Half Way Tree; Constant Spring; Stony Hill;Golden Spring	Temple Hall
53	Half Way Tree	Constant Spring; Manor Park; Stony Hill;	Above Rocks
54	Half Way Tree	Constant Spring; Manor Park; Stony Hill; Lawrence Tavern	Border
61	Downtown	East Street; Heroes Circle; Marescaux Road; Tom Redcam Drive; Old Hope Road; Liguanea; Papine	Gordon Town
66	Downtown	South Camp Road; Cross Road; Old Hope Road; Liguanea; Mona Road	Hermitage
68	Downtown	Cross Roads; Old Hope Road;Hope Pastures; Papine	UWI Back Gate
72	Half Way Tree	Hope Road; Liguanea; Mona Road	August Town
74	Downtown	Cross Roads; Half Way Tree;West Kings House Road; Old Church Road	Barbican
75	Papine	Liguanea; Hope Road; Half Way Tree; Molynes Road; Washington Boulevard	Ferry
75A	UWI Back Gate	Papine; Liguanea; Hope Road; Half Way Tree; Dunrobin Avenue; Washington Boulevard	Ferry
76	Downtown	Marescaux Road;Tom Redcam Drive; New Kingston; Lady Musgrave Road; East Kings House Road	Barbican
77	Downtown	Windward Road; Mountain View; Liguanea; Papine	August Town
78	Downtown	Cross Roads; Old Hope Road; Liguanea; Papine	August Town
83	Downtown	Windward Road; Mountain View Avenue; New Kingston	Half Way Tree
86	Downtown	South Camp Road	Cross Roads
88	Downtown	East Street; Deanery Road; Mountain View Avenue;	Cross Roads
89	Downtown	Upper Elleston Road; Deanery Road	Vineyard Town
97	Downtown	Windward Road; Sir Florizel Glasspole Highway	Eleven Miles
98	Downtown	Windward Road; Sir Florizel Glasspole Highway; Airport	Port Royal
99	Downtown	Windward Road; Sir Florizell Glasspole Highway	Harbour View

==== Shuttle Routes ====
Route	Start	Via	End
200	Downtown	Lower Church St; Port Royal Street; Beckon Street	Old Train Station
500	Downtown	Cross Road	Half Way Tree
800	Cross Roads	Old Hope Road, New Kingston,	Half Way Tree
900	Half Way Tree	Hope Road, Liguanea	Papine

==== Express Routes ====
Route	Start	Via	End
3Ax	Christian Gardens	Gregory Park; Portmore Toll Road; Three Miles; Hagley Park Road; Half Way Tree	New Kingston
8Ax	Naggo Head	Garveymeade; Westchester; Portmore Toll Road; Marcus Garvey Drive; Three Miles; Hagley Park Road; Half Way Tree	New Kingston
12Ax	Naggo Head	Cumberland; Portmore Toll Road; Marcus Garvey Drive; Three Miles; Hagley Park Road; Half Way Tree	New Kingston
16Bx	Greater Portmore	Naggo Head; Gregory Park; Mandela Highway; Washington Boulevard	Constant Spring
17Ax	Greater Portmore	Naggo Head; Portmore Toll Road; Three Miles; Hagley Park Road; Half Way Tree	New Kingston
17Ex	Greater Portmore	Naggo Head; Portmore Toll Road; Marcus Garvey Drive; Downtown; Marescaux Road	Cross Roads
19Ax	Greater Portmore	Naggo Head; Portmore Causeway; Three Miles; Hagley Park Road; Half Way Tree; Hope Road; Liguanea; Old Hope Road	Papine
19Bx	Greater Portmore	Braeton Parkway; Portmore Toll Road; Three Miles; Hagley Park Road; Half Way Tree; Hope Road; Liguanea; Old Hope Road	Papine
20Ax	Greater Portmore	Monza/Daytona; Portmore Pine; Naggo Head; Portmore Toll Road; Three Miles; Hagley Park Road; Half Way Tree	New Kingston
21Ax	Spanish Town	Mandela Highway; Washington Boulevard; Molynes Road; Half Way Tree; Hope Road; New Kingston	Cross Roads
22Ax	Spanish Town	Mandela Highway; Spanish Town Road; Three Miles; Marcus Garvey Drive	Downtown
22Ex	Spanish Town	Mandela Highway; Dyke Road; Portmore Toll Road; Marcus Garvey Drive	Downtown
22Bx	Spanish Town	Mandela Highway; Dyke Road; Portmore Toll Road; Marcus Garvey Drive; Downtown; Marescaux Road	Cross Roads
24Ex	Spanish Town	Mandela Highway; Washington Boulevard; Dunrobin Avenue; West Kings House Road; Waterloo Road; Hope Road; Liguanea; Old Hope Road; Papine	UWI Back Gate
25Ex	Spanish Town	Mandela Highway; Washington Boulevard; Dunrobin Avenue	Constant Spring
32Ax	Duhaney Park	Patrick City; Washington Boulevard; Dunrobin Avenue; Half Way Tree; New Kingston; Old Hope Road	Cross Roads
32Ex	Duhaney Park	Patrick City; Washington Boulevard; Dunrobin Avenue; Half Way Tree; Half Way Tree Road	Cross Roads
45Ex	Meadowbrook	Chancery Street; Red Hills Road; Half Way Tree; Hope Road; Liguanea; Old Hope Road; Papine	UWI Back Gate
50Ex	Seaview Gardens	Three Miles; Hagley Park Road; Half Way Tree; Hope Road; Liguanea	Papine
51Ex	Three Miles	Hagley Park Rd, Half Way Tree, Hope Road	Papine
53Ex	Above Rocks	Stony Hill, Constant Spring Road, Half Way Tree, Cross Roads	Downtown
54Ex	Border	Lawrence Tavern, Stony Hill, Golden Spring, Constant Spring	Downtown
73Ax	Half Way Tree	Hope Road; Liguanea; Papine	UWI Back Gate
75Ax	Six Miles	Washington Boulevard; Dunrobin Avenue; West Kings House Road; Hope Road; Liguanea; Old Hope Road; Papine	UWI Back Gate
75Ex	Six Miles	Washington Boulevard; Molynes Road; Half Way tree; Hope Road; Liguanea; Old Hope Road; Papine	UWI Back Gate
77Ex	Downtown	Mountain View Avenue; Old Hope Road; Liguanea; Papine	August Town
78Ex	Downtown	Cross Roads; Old Hope Road; Liguanea; Papine	August Town
83Ex	Half Way Tree	New Kingston; Trafalgar Road; Mountain View Avenue; Windward Road	Downtown
95Ex	Bull Bay	Sir Florizell Glasspole Highway; Windward Road; Mountain View Avenue; Old Hope Road; Liguanea;Papine	UWI Back Gate
97Ex	Bull Bay	Sir Florizel Glaspole Highway, Norman Manley Boulevard	Downtown
99Ex	Harbour View	Sir Florizel Glaspole Highway, Norman Manley Boulevard	Downtown

==== Premium Routes ====
Route	Start	Via	End
101	Constant Spring	Half Way Tree; Molynes Road; Washington Boulevard; Mandela Highway; Gregory Park; Naggo Head	Greater Portmore
102	Harbour View	Sir Florizel Glaspole Highway; Windward Road; National Heroes Circle; Cross Road; Half Way Tree; Hope Road; Liguanea; Papine	August Town
103	Spanish Town	Mandela Highway; Washington Boulevard; Molynes Road; Half Way Tree; Hope Road; New Kingston; Old Hope Road	Cross Roads
121	Innswood Village	Washington Boulevard, Molynes Road, New Kingston	Downtown
122	St Johns Heights	Washington Boulevard, Molynes Road, New Kingston	Cross Roads
123	Ensom Acres	Washington Boulevard, Molynes Road, New Kingston	Cross Roads
124	Ebony Vale	Molynes Road, New Kingston, Slipe Road	Downtown
125	Green Acres/Mercury Gardens	Washington Boulevard, Molynes Road, New Kingston	Cross Roads
126	Cross Roads	Washington Boulevard;Molynes Road; Half Way Tree,;New Kingston	White Waters
127	Cross Roads	Washington Boulevard, Molynes Road, New Kingston	Angels/Eltham
128	Papine	Washington Boulevard, Molynes Road, Half Way Tree, Hope Road	Angels
129	Downtown	Molynes Road, New Kingston, Slipe Road	Eltham/Angels
130	Downtown	Cross Roads; New Kingston; Half Way Tree; Washington Boulevard; Mandela Highway; Trans-Jamaica Highway. (Highway 2000)	Longville Park
131	Cross Roads	Downtown; Marcus Garvey Drive; Portmore Toll Road; Dyke Road; Trans-Jamaica Highway (Highway 2000)	New Harbour Village
132	Cross Roads	New Kingston; Half Way Tree; Washington Boulevard; Mandela Highway; Trans-Jamaica Highway (Highway 2000)	New Harbour Village
133	Downtown	Cross Roads; New Kingston; Half Way Tree; Washington Boulevard; Mandela Highway; Trans-Jamaica Highway (Highway 2000)	Claremont Heights
134	Downtown	Washington Blvd, Dunrobin Avenue, New Kingston	The Vineyards
136	Cross Roads	Trans-Jamaica Highway (Highway 2000), Washington Boulevard, Molynes Road, Half Way Tree, New Kingston	New Harbour Village 4
295	Half Way Tree	Mountain View Avenue, New Kingston	Harbour View
301	Cross Roads	Hellshire Main Road, Portmore Toll Road, Half Way Tree, New Kingston	Hellshire
303	Papine	Waterford, Portmore Toll Road, Half Way Tree, Hope Road	Christian Gardens
308	Papine	Garveymeade, Portmore Toll Road, Half Way Tree, Hope Road	Portmore Pines
312	Cross Roads	Portmore Toll Road, Hagley Park Rd, New Kingston	Cumberland
314	New Kingston	Portmore Toll Rd, Marcus Garvey Dr, Downtown, Cross Roads	Cumberland
315	Downtown	Braeton Parkway, Portmore Toll Road, Marcus Garvey Drive	Greater Portmore
316	Cross Roads	Hellshire Main Road, Mandela Highway, New Kingston	Greater Portmore
317	Cross Roads	Hellshire Main Road, Portmore Toll Road, Marcus Garvey Drive, Downtown	Greater Portmore
318	Cross Roads	Braeton Parkway, Half Way Tree, New Kingston	Greater Portmore
319	Papine	Hellshire Main Road, Portmore Toll Road, Hagley Park Road, Half Way Tree, Hope Road	Greater Portmore
320	Cross Roads	Braeton Parkway, Portmore Toll Road, Half Way Tree Road	Greater Portmore

== See also ==
- Transport in Jamaica
