= Manchester (Jamaica) Local Sustainable Development Plan =

The Manchester Local Sustainable Development Plan was prepared by the Manchester Parish Council (MPC) and the Manchester Parish Development Committee (MPDC), located in Mandeville, Jamaica, in Manchester Parish, and publicly presented to the community in July 2007. The Development Plan was completed after a thorough process of participation and citizen’s mobilization that took five years. This document is the first of its kind in the country and in the English speaking Caribbean. The Plan is based on the principles of community driven development, bottom-up democracy and local capacity building to achieve sustainable development.

The Plan is also part of the Local Government Reform initiatives, a national effort that seeks to decentralize certain government functions. The local planning approach follows in line with the tenets of Local Agenda 21, the global initiative to improve governance and quality of life at the community level. The plan also recognizes the United Nations’ Millennium Development Goals. The preparation of the plan involved different development agencies, local, national and international, and it is proposed as a model for this kind of developmental approach.

== Goals and Actions ==
The Plan was written to provide the Parish with proposed goals, objectives, actions, policy recommendation and implementation strategies inspired by the local residents’ visions that were gathered from a series of stakeholders meetings, community workshops and researches. This Local Sustainable Development Plan aims for a twenty-year multi-sectoral approach or collaboration between a myriad of sectors that will help to guide and achieve sustainable development and long-term planning for the region.

In terms of objectives, the Plan seeks to address the challenges experienced by the Parish as a whole in pertinent areas that includes housing provision, traffic congestion, waste generation, water shortage, education and the creation of economic opportunities. The plan therefore explores relevant issues such as Land Use Designations, Housing, Transportation, Waste Management, The Natural Environment, Energy, Water, Mining, Tourism, Agriculture, Social Services and Community participation and Local Governance, with regard to the principles of sustainability.

Manchester’s plan begin with a comprehensive vision for the future that clearly expresses that “the citizens of the parish imagine a future in which Manchester is known as a great place to live, work, play and learn, with lively and attractive towns, strong communities, and a scenic countryside.”

== Preparation of the Plan ==
The preparation of the plan has followed a systematic process. Each stage of planning, from building partnership to evaluation, builds upon the previous. Yet, because the plan must be updated, the process is also cyclical. As the plan is implemented, changing political priorities and local realities could mean that the Parish must adjust its course in order to achieve its vision.

The stages in the process were as follows:

1. Building and strengthening partnership. The PDC began by forming relationship with key agencies and individuals. Strengthening these partnerships has continued throughout the planning process.

2. Gathering community information. Community workshops engaged residents in collecting information on local geography, history, culture and economy.

3. Parish Profile. The Plan, completed and published in April 2004, is a comprehensive compilation of information containing almost everything one would need to know about the Parish.

4. Community Planning Workshops. Interactive workshops were held in communities across the Parish, in which citizens discussed issues concerning their communities and formulated visions for the future.

5. Sector Work Groups. Work groups were composed of experts and policy makers in specific fields like agriculture, infrastructure, mining and environment. Through a series of meetings, these groups discussed possible solutions for the challenges facing their sector.

6. Draft 1 of the Plan. The first Draft of Manchester’s plan was released in 2006 and is based on information from the community workshops and sectors work groups.

7. Stakeholder Meetings. Conversations with stakeholders further refined the direction of the plan.

8. Draft 2. The second draft of the plan presents a comprehensive vision and complete set of recommendations.

9. Land Use Survey. The data was used to analyse the current pattern of land use and provided assistance for policy development and land use proposals in the Manchester LSDP.

10. Community and Stakeholder Engagement. Workshops with communities and stakeholders will give everyone a chance to review Draft 2 and influence the final draft.

11. Final Plan. Responding to community and stakeholders input, the final draft will be the one to be implemented by all the various actors.

12. Monitoring and Evaluation. The Parish will need to monitor and evaluate its progress toward its vision. The plan should be updated every five years or so.

== Fundamental Principles of the Document ==
Manchester approach to the plan is based on these fundamental principles:

- The ultimate goal is sustainability. Manchester must provide for the present while ensuring a better quality of life for the future through proper management of its resources. This requires considering the connections between environmental, social, and economic forces.

- The plan must belong to the citizens. The intent of the plan is to improve the lives of residents. The plan will only be effectively if citizens are central in its creation and implementation.

- The plan should take a long-term and global perspective as well as a twenty-year, local perspective. The Parish must consider the entire range of relevant issues, from global trends to local realities. Likewise, the Parish must aim for short-term improvement while also looking much further into the future.

- Manchester can use growth and change to its advantage. The citizens of Manchester welcome to wealth brought by development, but they realise that growth can present challenges. The Parish must therefore learn to take advantage of the opportunities created by change.

The resulting plan follows these principles while responding to the changing environmental, economic, and developmental forces that continue to shape the region.

== The vision of the community ==
Manchester’s vision encompasses four main themes, which form the framework for the plan.

1. Cool, Clean and Green. The Parish will preserve its natural resources while building upon its cool climate, attractive environment and green vistas.

2. Growing and Diversifying the Economy. The Parish will grow by taking advantages of new economic opportunities in creative ways.

3. Creating strong and vibrant communities. The Parish’s communities will be desirable place to live, where civic pride and community spirit is sustained for generations to come.

4. Responsible and Creative use of space. The Parish will promote sustainable development and good design that leads to wise use of land.

== The plan's more relevant elements ==
The principal issues and chapters covered by the documents were:

- The Natural Environment: Cool, Clean, Green. The natural conditions and resources which Manchester has to work with. Conserving the natural environment, including land, water and mineral resources, protecting tourist areas and greening rural and urban communities;

- The Social and Cultural Environment: Creating Strong and Vibrant Communities. The needs for housing, education, health, safety, and other social and community needs and a protected and enhanced cultural heritage;

- The Economic Development Element: Growing and Diversifying the Economy. This part focuses on improving the productivity of traditional industries (Agriculture, Mining, Tourism) and building new industries that capitalize on opportunities as Manchester's strength in education and responses to climate change;

- The Built Environment: Responsible and Creative use of Space. Aims to accommodate and achieve the social and economic requirements presented in the other chapters. It covers land use, transportation, housing and urban design, water, waste management, energy, security and other aspects of infrastructure and utilities.

- Implementation and Recommendations.This chapter set forth infrastructure, development and program criteria and priorities; a guide to program planning and budgeting, monitoring and revision, community participation and continuing enhancement of local governance, with a focus o how local government reform can empower sustainability.
