= Floyd West =

Jamaican musician (born 1980)

- Also known as: Floyd West, Pied Piper
- Born: Floyd West; 13 December 1980 (age 45)
- Origin: Saint Catherine, Jamaica
- Genres: Reggae, Grass Root Reggae, reggae fusion, Jazz, Dancehall, dub poetry
- Occupations: Musician, songwriter
- Years active: 2006–present

Floyd West (born 13 December 1980), also known as the Pied Piper, is a contemporary reggae roots singer and songwriter from Jamaica. Born and raised in Portmore Saint Catherine, Floyd started music from an early age singing in a church choir. He was encouraged by his mother and sister who also sang in the local choir.

== Biography ==
Floyd attended Bridgeport High School before transferring to Kingston Technical High School. It was during his time in high school that Floyd discovered his love for music, dub and drama, and he won several awards at the Annual Jamaican Culture and Development Commission Festivals. After high school Floyd joined a band, known as the Gremlin Crew. He bounced around between several big studios such as Penthouse Records and Sly and Robbie where he found his mentor, Philip Linton, owner and operator of Arrows Studio. Floyd tried his hand at several jobs before receiving a break in music. In 2000 he enrolled briefly in the Jamaica Defense Force before leaving to continue his musical dream in 2005.

== Music career ==
Floyd's music is heavily influenced by jazz, reggae, dancehall and dub. In 2010, Floyd recorded a single, entitled "Corruption", for a label by Jamaican producer Shane Brown. In 2006, Floyd's debut album was released, also called Corruption. The single was responsible for his early popularity within Jamaica, followed by "Burning You Babylon" and "These Days". In January 2011, he released the music video for "Run Come", directed by Jamaican film director Mykal Cushnie.

In December 2010, Floyd performed at Sting, marking a turning point in his career. Floyd is now a regular performer at Jamnesia, alongside other popular acts such as Protoje, Blu Grass, Raging Fire, and No-Maddz, a group who appeared in a Puma advertisement.

== Discography ==
Albums

- 2006: Corruption

Singles

- 2006: "Corruption"
- 2006: "These Days"
- 2006: "Burning you Babylon"
- 2010: "Reasons"
- 2011: "Run Come"
