= Linval Dixon =

Jamaican footballer (born 1971)

Personal information
- Date of birth: 14 September 1971 (age 55)
- Place of birth: Old Harbour Bay, Jamaica
- Height: 6 ft 1 in (1.85 m)
- Position: Defender

Youth career
- Clarendon College

Senior career*
Years	Team	Apps	(Gls)
1995	Charleston Battery	12	(4)
1995–2002	Hazard United		
2002–2003	Charleston Battery	44	(0)

International career
1993–2003	Jamaica	127	(3)

Managerial career
- 2005–2006: Portmore United U-23
- 2007–2009: Portmore United
- 2009: Portmore United (assistant)
- 2010: Portmore United
- * Club domestic league appearances and goals

Linval Dixon (born 14 September 1971) is a Jamaican football coach and former player. A former defender, he played for American club Charleston Battery and Hazard United at club level. At international level, he made 127 appearances for the Jamaica national team. He has worked as head coach at Portmore United.

== Club career ==
Dixon was born in Old Harbour Bay, Saint Catherine, Jamaica. He attended Clarendon College where he played on the school's team. In 1995, he signed with the Charleston Battery of the USISL. He moved to Hazard United in the fall of 1995 and played for them until 2002 when he returned to the Battery for two seasons in the USL A-League. In 2003, Dixon and his teammates won the A-League championship.

== International career ==
Dixon has captained Jamaica and was a participant at the 1998 FIFA World Cup. He made his debut in 1991 and played his last international in 2004 against Venezuela, collecting over 90 caps, including 27 FIFA World Cup qualifying matches.

Scores and results list Jamaica's goal tally first, score column indicates score after each Dixon goal.

List of international goals scored by Linval Dixon
No.	Date	Venue	Opponent	Score	Result	Competition	Ref.
1	20 August 1995	Kingston, Jamaica	Zambia	—	3-1	Friendly	
2	27 February 1997	National Statdium, Kingston, Jamaica	Bermuda	1-0	3-2	1997 Caribbean Cup qualification	
3	29 October 1997	Basseterre, Saint Kitts and Nevis	Saint Kitts and Nevis	—	1-1	Friendly	

== Managerial career ==
In 2005, Dixon became the manager of Portmore United U23 team.

In 2007, he became the head coach of the club's senior team, with whom he won the 2007–08 National Premier League. At the end of the 2009 season, he stepped down to become an assistant manager. He returned to his position as head manager for the 2010 season.

== Honours ==
=== As manager ===
Portmore United

- National Premier League: 2007–08

== See also ==
- List of men's footballers with 100 or more international caps
