= T2 road (Jamaica) =

Highway in Jamaica

T2
- Portmore Causeway; Portmore Toll Road
- T2 highlighted in blue

Route information
- Maintained by TransJamaican Highway Limited
- Length: 6.5 km (4.0 mi)
- Existed: 2006–present
- History: Upgraded to a tolled 2×3-lane carriageway and opened in June 2006, as part of Highway 2000 Phase 1A

Major junctions
- East end: Marcus Garvey Drive near Kingston
- Dyke Road; Port Henderson Road
- West end: Dawkins Drive in Portmore

Location
- Country: Jamaica
- Parishes: Saint Andrew, Saint Catherine

Highway system
- Roads in Jamaica
← T1	→ T3

T2, also known as the Portmore Causeway or Portmore Toll Road, is a short tolled controlled-access highway in Jamaica, forming one of the two corridors of the TransJam Highways network, formerly known as the East–West Leg of Highway 2000. The highway runs for approximately 6.5 kilometres (4.0 mi) between the Mandela Highway near Kingston and Marcus Garvey Drive in Portmore, crossing Hunts Bay on a six-lane bridge. It is the shortest motorway in the national network, along with T1 and T3.

Originally an ordinary causeway connecting the town of Portmore to Kingston, it was widened into a tolled, dual three-lane carriageway and opened to traffic in June 2006 as part of Phase 1A of Highway 2000, becoming the third toll facility on the network after the Vineyards plaza (2003) and the Spanish Town plaza (2004). The Portmore section includes a six-lane bridge and a 21-lane toll plaza.

== History ==
The Portmore Causeway originated as a standalone connector road linking Kingston and Saint Andrew to the newly developing town of Portmore, on reclaimed land across Hunts Bay. As part of Portmore's development, a dyke was built to contain the Rio Cobre and the surrounding lowlands were filled using material dredged from the harbour and quarried from the Port Henderson Hills, allowing the causeway to be constructed across the bay. The causeway opened to traffic on January 21, 1970, built by contractor Moses Matalon, and served for decades as Portmore's principal link to Kingston, functioning as an alternate route to the Mandela Highway. The road supported the rapid growth of Portmore, whose population rose from fewer than 2,000 residents in the late 1960s to about 5,000 by 1970, and which continued expanding through subsequent decades with new housing schemes such as Bridgeport, Passage Fort, and Waterford.

As part of Phase 1A of the Highway 2000 project, the causeway was widened from its original configuration into a tolled, dual three-lane carriageway, and reopened to traffic in June 2006. This made it the third toll facility on the network, following the Vineyards plaza, which opened in 2003, and the Spanish Town plaza, which opened in 2004. The upgraded route, designated T2, together with T1, now forms the TransJam Highways network operated by TransJamaican Highway Limited.

== Route description ==
T2 begins at an interchange with Marcus Garvey Drive near Kingston, in the parish of Saint Andrew. Heading west, the highway crosses Hunts Bay on its six-lane bridge into the parish of Saint Catherine. On the western shore, the highway meets Port Henderson Road and Dyke Road before terminating at an interchange with Dawkins Drive in Portmore.

The highway is a tolled, dual three-lane carriageway, with its toll plaza located on the western side, near Portmore.

== Interchanges ==
The entire route is located in the parishes of Saint Catherine and Saint Andrew.

T2 motorway
Parish	Town	mi	km	Destinations	Notes
Saint Catherine	Portmore	0.00	0.0	Dawkins Drive	Western terminus
Saint Catherine	Portmore	0.12	0.2	Dyke Road	
Saint Catherine	Hellshire / Port Henderson	0.62	1.0	Port Henderson Road	
Saint Catherine	Port Henderson	0.99	1.6	Portmore toll plaza	
Saint Catherine		2.05	3.3	Bridge near Hunts Bay	Parish line between Saint Catherine and Saint Andrew
Saint Andrew	Kingston	4.04	6.5	Marcus Garvey Drive	Eastern terminus
1.000 mi = 1.609 km; 1.000 km = 0.621 mi Toll
