= Old Harbour, Jamaica =

Town in southern Jamaica

Coordinates: 17°56′00″N 77°07′00″W

Location of Old Harbour in Jamaica

Old Harbour (Jamaican Patois: Olaba) is a town in southern Jamaica, in southern St. Catherine parish near the island's southern coast. Nearby settlements and notable places include Old Harbour Bay, Longville Park, Free Town, McCooks Pen, Port Esquivel, Moores Pen and Little Goat Island.

== Transportation ==
T1, the PJ Patterson Highway, passes to the south of Old Harbour, while the A2 road crosses through the center of the town as Old Harbour Road. The Old Harbour interchange on T1 provides an exit serving the town, and also serves Old Harbour Bay.

=== Other transports ===
Old Harbour used to be served by a station on the national railway network. The nearby Port Esquivel is a major shipping hub for the exportation of bauxite and sugar. Port Esquivel is also the location of a tank farm constructed for ethanol but repurposed for petroleum distillates.

== See also ==
- Railway stations in Jamaica
