= Porus, Jamaica =

Porus
- Community
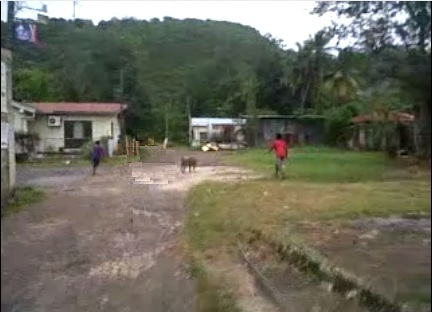
- An alley in Porus, Jamaica

- Location within Jamaica
- Coordinates: 18.0321582°N 77.412715°W
- Country: Jamaica
- Parish: Manchester
- Founded: 1840
- Founder: James Phillippo
- Elevation: 143 m (469 ft)

Population.
  - Estimate (2009): 6,003
- Time zone: UTC-5 (EST)

Porus is a village in Manchester, Jamaica, that overlooks a plain to the south, with hills behind it to the north. A tributary of the Rio Minho runs parallel to the main road, helping to keep the atmosphere cool.

== History ==
Porus was founded in 1840 by the missionary James Phillippo as a free village for ex-slaves following emancipation. It was his sixth such village. It was originally called Vale Lionel after the then Governor of Jamaica, Sir Lionel Smith, but was soon renamed "Porous", most probably after the porous soil in the vicinity. It was described as a "small estate" on the journey from Savanna-la-Mar to Kingston taken by M. G. Lewis, a plantation owner, in 1817.

In its early days, the village had a very small population, although it boasted a large coffee market. It is now a thriving community of predominantly small farmers and artisans.

Thomas Albert Samuel Manley, father of Norman Washington Manley, one of Jamaica's National Heroes, was born in Porus in 1852.

== Transport ==
=== Road ===
Porus is on the A2 road, which runs from Spanish Town in south central Jamaica to Savanna-la-Mar on the south-west coast.

=== Rail ===
From 1895 to 1992, Porus was served by Porus railway station on the Kingston to Montego Bay line. Although all services on the line have ceased, the extensive (for Jamaica) station buildings remain. Future generations are hoping to rebuild these services better than ever.

== Public amenities ==
There are seven schools, (Porus District of churches) churches, a post office, a police station, a comprehensive health clinic, and various small retail outlets.

== See also ==
- List of cities and towns in Jamaica
