= Lionel Town, Jamaica =

Jamaican municipality

Coordinates: 17.775°N 77.235°W

Location of Lionel Town in Jamaica

Lionel Town is a settlement in the Clarendon parish of Jamaica. It has a population of 5,416 as of 2009. Lionel Town has a Community Hospital. The town is named after the British colonial administrator General Sir Lionel Smith who was the island's governor at the time of emancipation in 1836.
