= Rio Bueno, Jamaica =

Village in Jamaica

Rio Bueno
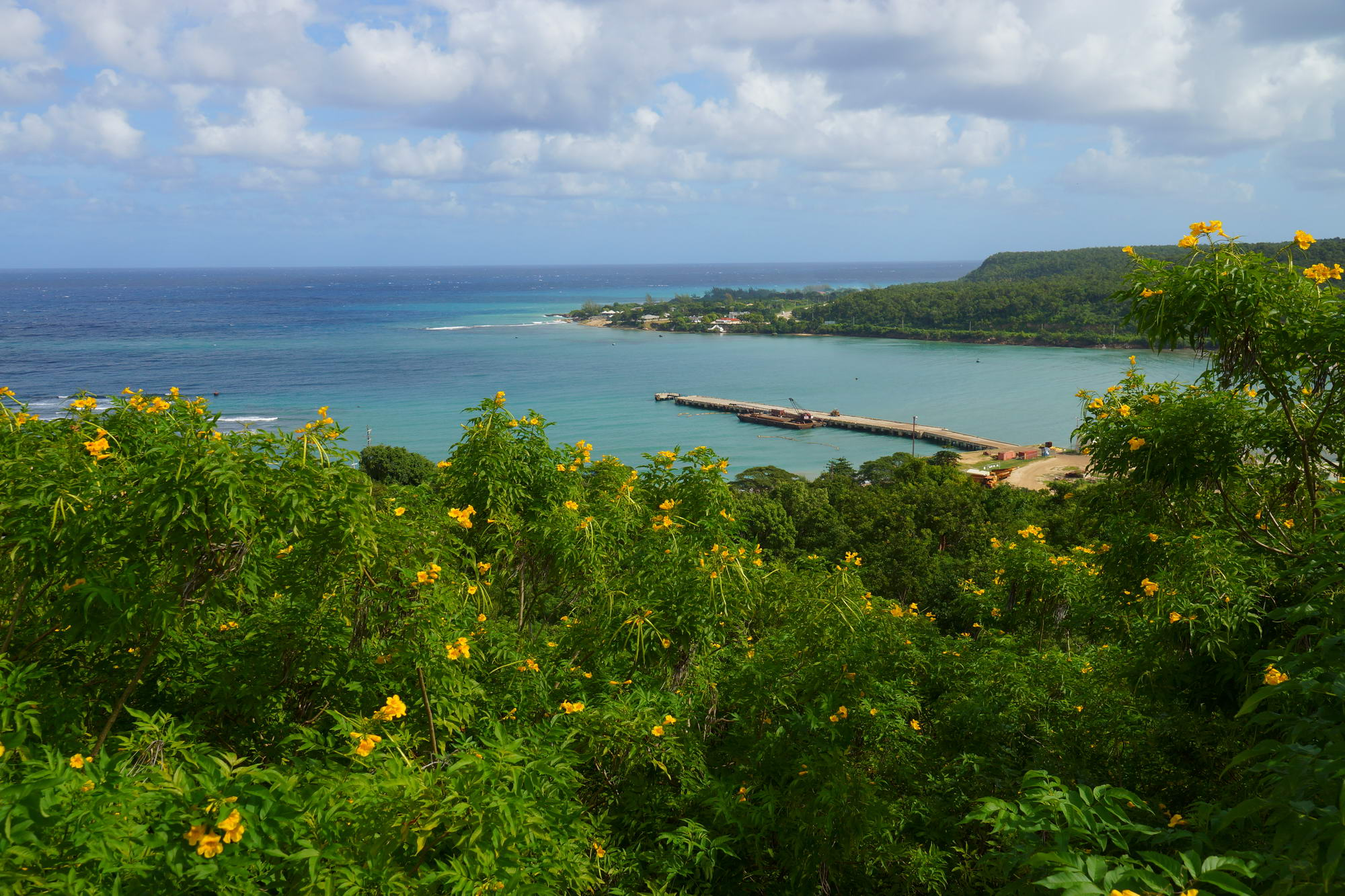

- Location within Jamaica
- Coordinates: 18°28′44″N 77°28′19″W
- Country: Jamaica
- Parish: Trelawny Parish

Population (2009)
  - Total: 1,096

Rio Bueno is a small seaside village on the border between the parishes of St Ann and Trelawny in northern Jamaica, and owes its importance, history and livelihood to the Rio Bueno Harbour, which is the deepest harbour in Jamaica, and perhaps one of the reasons why Columbus dropped anchor there on his first visit to Jamaica. It has a population of 1,096 as of 2009.

== History ==
The village sprung up during the early days of English Colonialism as a way stop for both maritime and overland visitors, and it traditionally housed taverns, guesthouses and inns. It used the postmark A70 when the post office opened in c. 1859. By the late 19th century the town was almost deserted, a shadow of its former self, but was then resurrected by the construction of a bauxite-shipping wharf in the mid-20th century.

The village retains its historic character, with its old fort, warehouses and churches situated along the water's edge, against the backdrop of the green hills of Trelawny.

== Churches and forts ==
Rio Bueno boasts many churches, two of which are of great historical importance to both Jamaica and the area. Baptist missionaries who broke away from the Church of England originally built the Rio Bueno Baptist church in 1829. The Rio Bueno Baptist church was, for a short while, the major place of worship and education for converted blacks living in the area. The humble meeting hall lasted only three short years before members of the Colonial Church Union, a band of vigilante white planters, merchants and estate workers intent on displacing the support base of the nonconformist missionaries, burnt it to the ground. The Baptists, however, were not to be underestimated, and by 1834 a new Baptist chapel was built. Both churches exist in harmony today, each relishing its colorful and longstanding history, both celebrating worship on Sunday mornings with their discrete congregations.

In the West end of Rio Bueno is the ruins of Fort Dundas. The fort dated from late 18th century when Jamaica's Governor, Lord Balcarres, commissioned it to defend Jamaica against the threat of attacks from Cuba. Fort Dundas got its name from the British Secretary of War at the time, Henry Dundas.
