= Christiana, Jamaica =

Settlement in Jamaica

Coordinates: 18.172°N 77.489°W

Location of Christiana in Jamaica

Christiana is a settlement in Jamaica. The town was originally called Struan Castle. During the early days of British colonial rule, it was a popular destination for British citizens due to the cool climate and the sometimes foggy weather.

== Notable people ==
- Roger Cross, actor are originally from this settlement
- Lila Iké, singer and musician
- Byron Lee, musician
