= Old Harbour Bay, Jamaica =

Settlement in Jamaica

Coordinates: 17.901°N 77.105°W

Location of Old Harbour Bay in Jamaica

Old Harbour Bay is a settlement in Jamaica. It has a population of 8,537 as of 2009.

Under Spanish Jamaica, Old Harbour was known as Esquivel.

Old Harbour Bay is located in St. Catherine Jamaica and comprises many smaller sub-divisions such as: Dagga Bay, Buddho, Crossroad, Blackwood Gardens Scheme, Settlement, Terminal, Salt Plane, Narine Lane (formerly known as Hellgate), Salt Gully, Bay Bottom, New Road, Capture Land, Kelly's Pen, Thompson Pen, Ghetto Lane, One Bump, McLeod Close (formerly known as 13th street), Panton Town and more
