= Manchester Parish =

Parish of Jamaica

Coordinates: 18°03′N 77°32′W

Manchester Manchesta
- Parish
- Manchester in Jamaica
- Country: Jamaica
- County: Middlesex
- Capital: Mandeville
- Major towns: Christiana; Porus; Williamsfield; Coleyville

Area
  - Total: 830 km^{2} (320 sq mi)
  - Rank: 6th

Population (2022)
  - Total: 193,694
  - Density: 230/km^{2} (600/sq mi)

The Parish of Manchester (Jamaican Patois: Manchesta) is a parish located in west-central Jamaica, in the county of Middlesex. Its capital, Mandeville, is a major business centre. Its St. Paul of the Cross Pro-Cathedral is the episcopal see of the Latin Catholic Diocese of Mandeville.

== History ==
Taino/Arawak settlement in the parish was substantiated when in 1792, a surveyor found three carvings, believed to be Amerindian Zemi, in a cave in the Carpenter's Mountains. They are now at the British Museum.

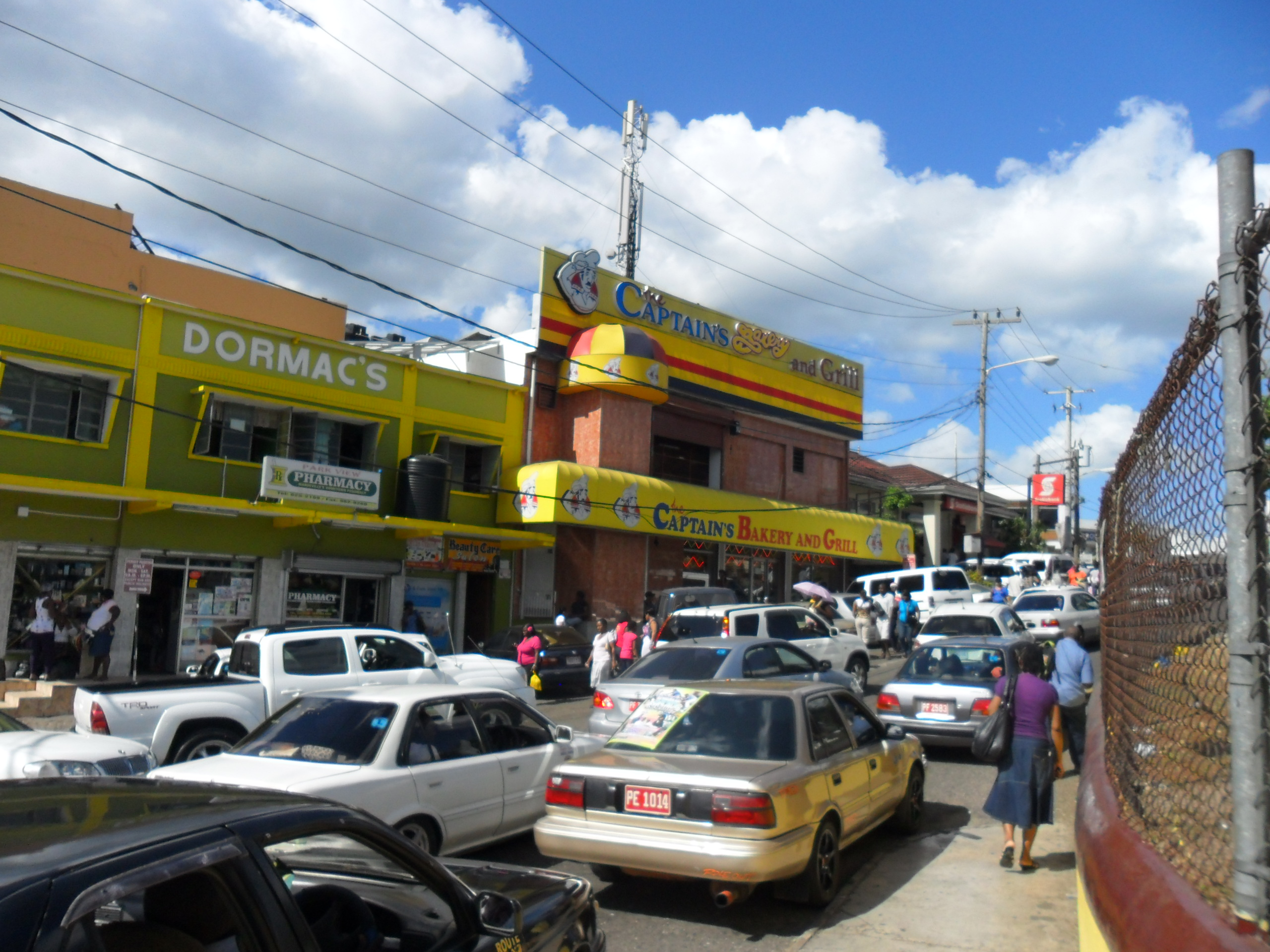
Park Crescent, Mandeville (2012)

Manchester was formed in 1814, by an Act of the House of Assembly, making it one of the newest parishes of Jamaica. It was formed as a result of the amalgamation of portions of the parishes St. Elizabeth, Clarendon and the entirety of Vere. The amalgamation was done in response to a petition from the inhabitants of Mile Gully, May Pen and Carpenters Mountain who complained that they were too far away from an administrative centre. Manchester was named in honour of William Montagu, 5th Duke of Manchester, the then Governor of Jamaica. He was governor for 19 years, setting the record as the longest-serving governor of the island. The capital town, Mandeville, established in 1816, was named after his eldest son, Lord Mandeville.

No sugar estates can be found in the parish; slaves worked on coffee plantations. After emancipation, the ex-slaves became independent coffee farmers. The irish potato was first introduced to Jamaica at Bethany, a town in the parish. Citrus also became an important crop, as in 1920, the citrus fruit ortanique, a cross between the orange and tangerine, was developed by Charles Jackson.

Many of Jamaica's businesses were started in Mandeville; the Mandeville Hotel, one of the oldest in the Caribbean, began operations in 1875. The first "Free Library" in Jamaica was established in 1938, and is the oldest Parish Library.

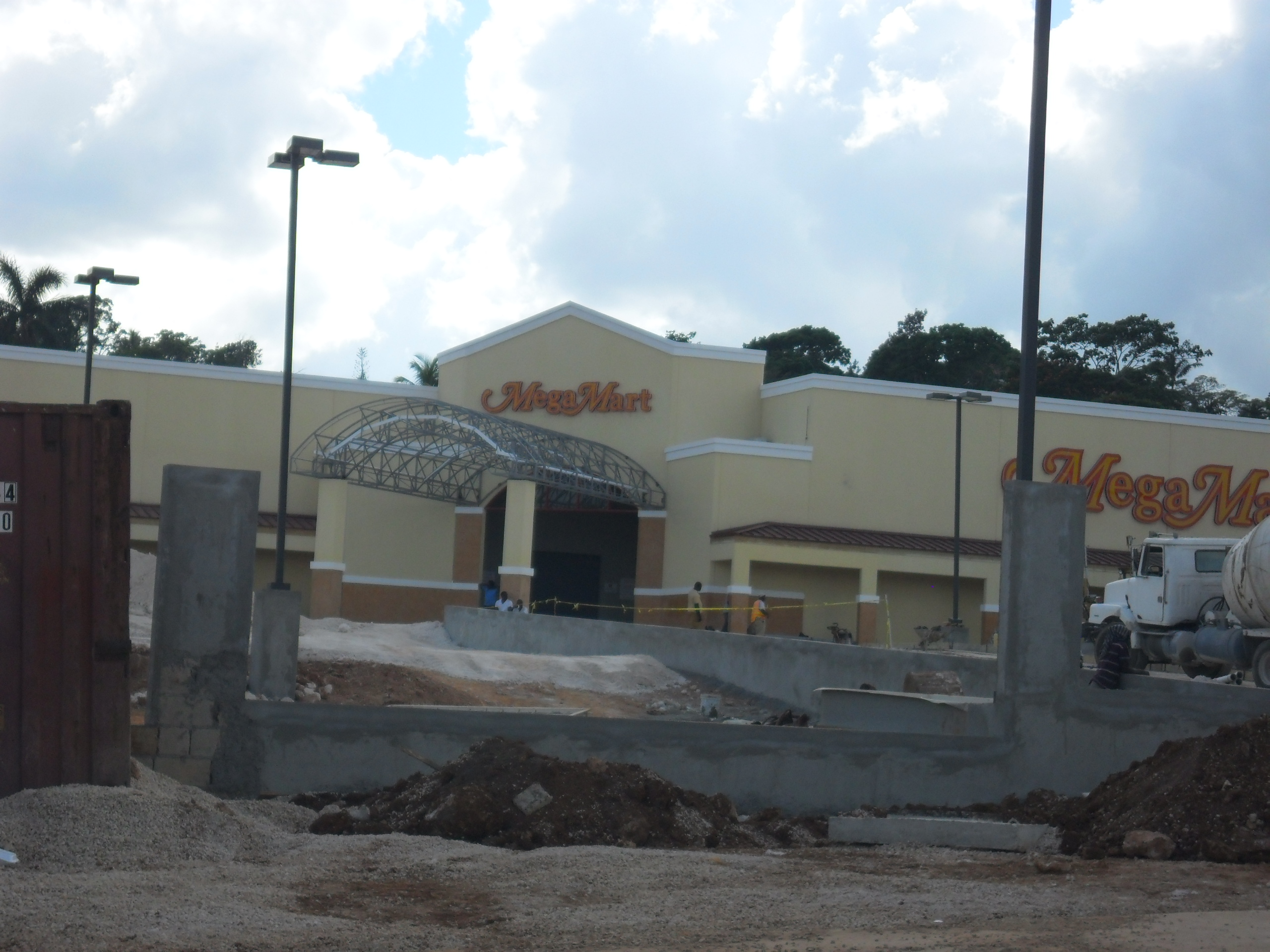
MegaMart, Mandeville under construction in December 2012.

The growth of the town was given a substantial stimulus when Alcan Bauxite Company opened operations there. It built houses for its then mostly expatriate staff. The relatively high wages lured many educated Jamaicans there. Mandeville continues to grow rapidly due to it being considered one of the most attractive towns in Jamaica and the cleanest of them all.

Mandeville boasts no fewer than 14 shopping centres, two hospitals (one public and one private), medical centres and many doctors. Next to Kingston, it provides the best medical services in the island, a major asset for tourism development.

== Population ==
The population of Manchester is 193,694 The Statistical Institute of Jamaica Census2022. Mandeville, the capital and chief town of the parish, has a Mayor, Donovan Mitchell and a deputy mayor, Rohan Kennedy. It has a population of over 30,485.

== Geography ==
Mandeville, the parish capital is located at latitude 17°51'N, longitude 77°38'W. Manchester is bordered by St. Elizabeth in the west, Clarendon in the east and by Trelawny in the north. Manchester covers an area of 830 km^{2}, making it Jamaica's sixth-largest parish. It has three mountain ranges — the Carpenters Mountains, the May Day Mountains, and the Don Figuerero Mountains. The highest point is 2,770 feet (840 m) above sea level in the Carpenters Mountains. Manchester is divided into four political districts (constituencies): North-West, North-East, Central and Southern Manchester.

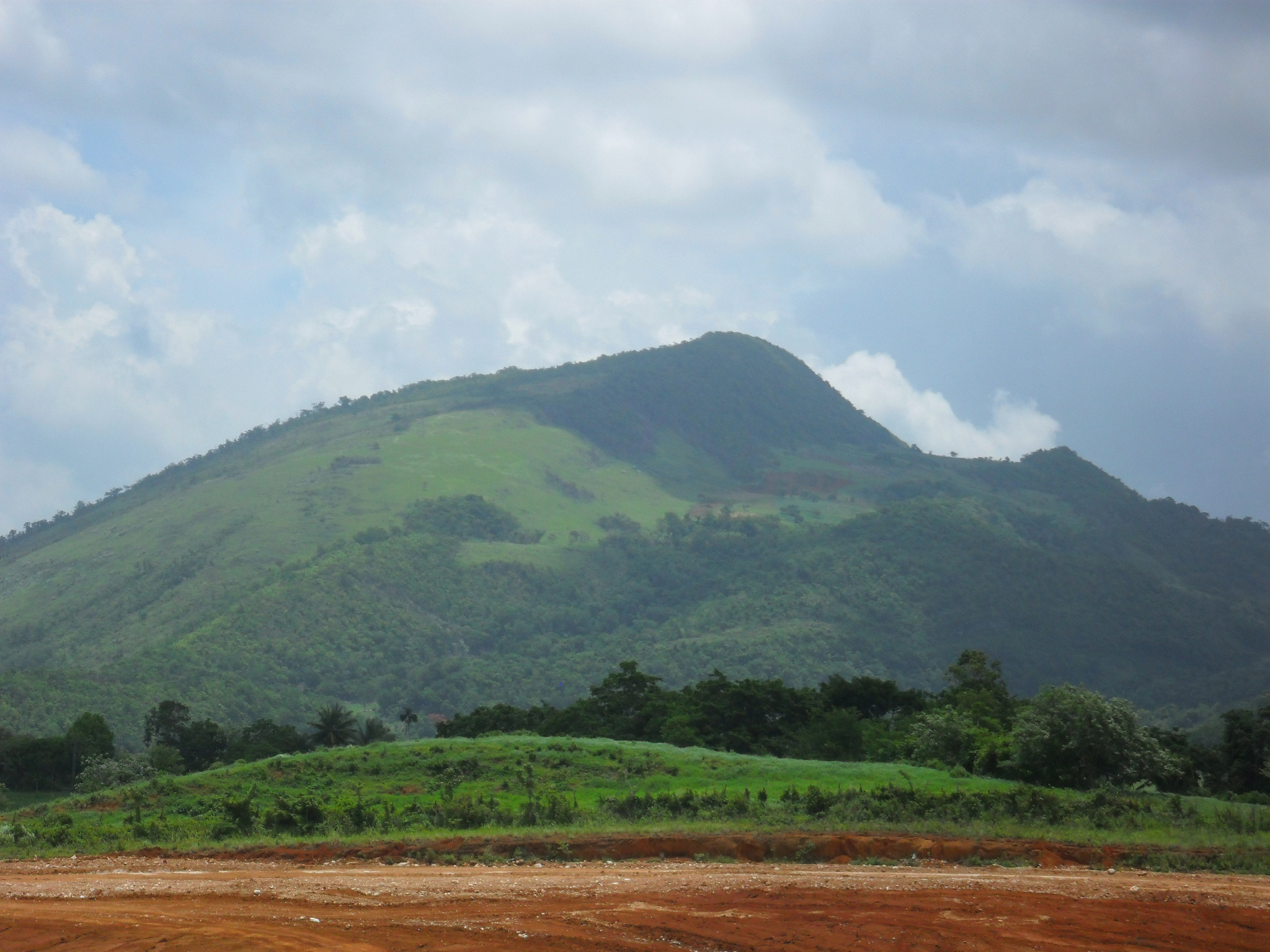
Mile Gully Mountain (2010)

Over 90% of the parish's surface is limestone so there is an abundance of cockpits, sinkholes, caves and underground passages. Gourie Cave, near Christiana, is the longest of the over 100 caves in the parish, as well as the longest known cave in Jamaica (3505m). Smokey Hole Cave, in Cross Keys, is the deepest known cave on the island (194m). Oxford Cave, near Auchtembeddie, in the NW part of the parish, is another of the major speleological sites found in Manchester, and was once noted as a roosting site for the now possibly extinct bat species Phyllonycteris aphylla. Manchester also has large bauxite deposits, with parts of the parish having been strip-mined as a result, notably in William's Field, Hope, and Blue Mountain.

The parish offers a variety of climate, vegetation and scenery. The capital, Mandeville, is situated at an elevation of 626 m (2,054 ft). The town is noted for its climate, and temperatures range from a low of 12.7 °C (55 °F) in December and January, to a high of 33 °C (91 °F) in July and August. There are very few rivers in the parish, and the existing ones are rather small; Alligator Hole River, Alligator Pond River, Gut River, Hector's River, Two Rivers, and Swift River. Hector's River runs along the border of Manchester and Trelawny, sinks at Troy where it flows underground for approximately six kilometers and rises below Oxford Cave as One Eye River. Despite this, water supply is generally scarce; the southern districts often suffer drought.

== Commerce ==
There is no large-scale cultivation of crops as the area is generally mountainous. Crops such as sugar cane require large tracts of flat land. Bananas, coffee and pimento, annatto, and ginger are grown, and the parish is noted for its citrus (including oranges, ortaniques, and grapefruit), much of which are exported. Christiana, 28 km (17 mi) north of Mandeville, is the second largest town of the parish. The Christiana Land Authority assists agricultural development in the region. Irish potato is grown considerably in the Christiana area and it is the centre of a large banana and ginger-growing district.

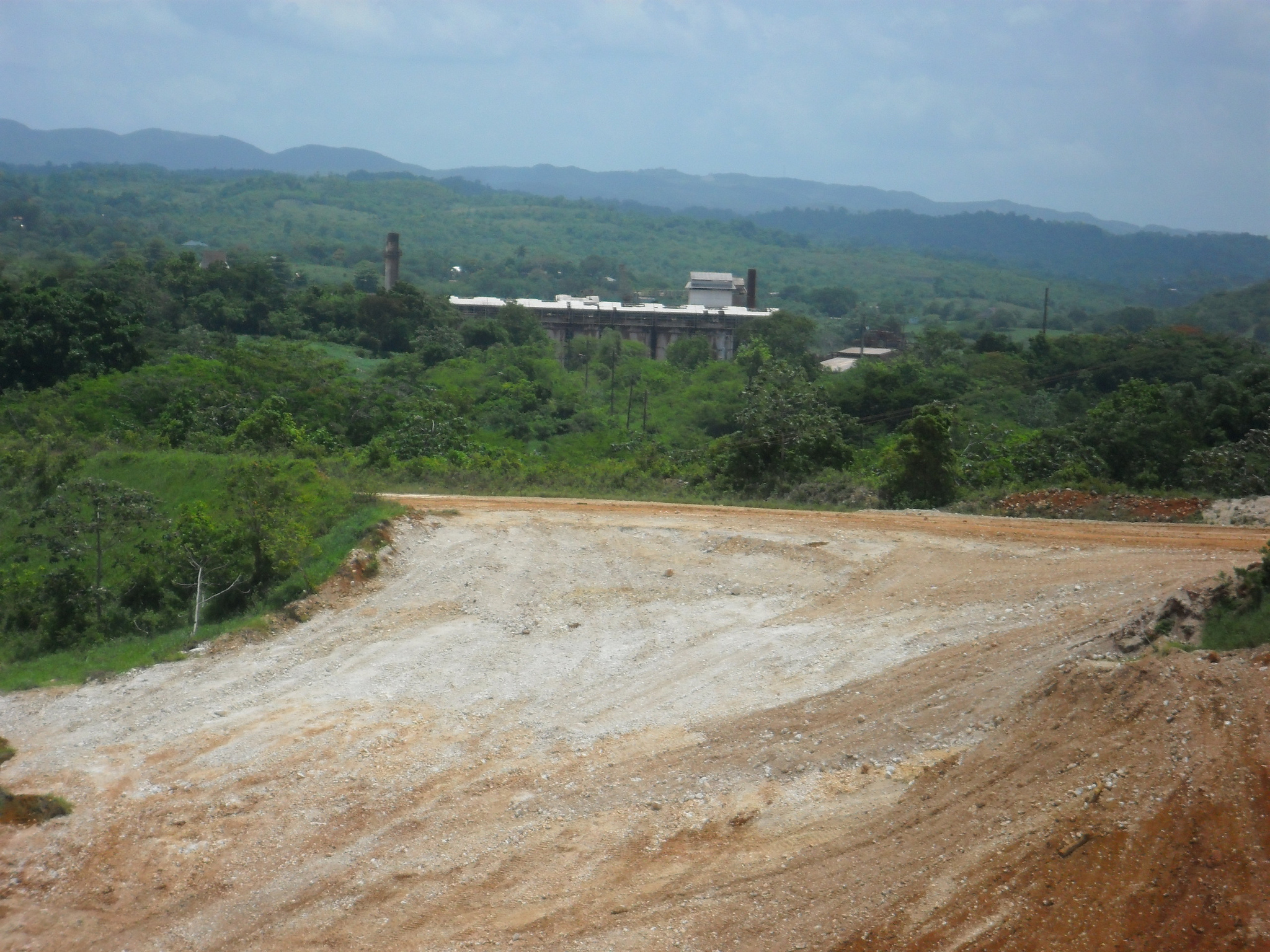
Windalco, Alumina plant in the background (Kirkvine, Manchester)

Manchester is a centre of the bauxite mining industry. The first bauxite mining companies were Alcan and Alpart. Alcan, a large world-renowned Canadian company, had a strong presence in the town and was one of the main employers. It lured many Jamaicans because of high salaries and the benefits offered. Alpart, short for Aluminum Partners of Jamaica, was initially formed as a joint venture of Kaiser Aluminum, Reynolds Aluminum, and Anaconda. It is still in operation in Nain St Elizabeth parish; however, it is now jointly owned by UC Rusal of Russia and Hydro Aluminum of Norway.

The parish created the Manchester Local Sustainable Development Plan in 2007 to improve the community over the next 20 years.

== Television ==
- ZQI-TV (TVJ) Channel 13, Spur Tree, Jamaica, Hype TV, CVM, NCU Television (Ch. 188- Flow)

== Special attractions ==
Captain Alexander Woodburn Heron's tomb at the top of Shooter's Hill, now called "Heron Hill" by the locals.

Roxborough Estate is the birthplace of Jamaican National Hero and its first premier, Norman Washington Manley.

== Education ==
=== High schools ===
Secondary high

- Belair High
- Bellefield High
- Bishop Gibson High (girls)
- Christiana High
- Cross Keys High
- DeCarteret College
- Manchester High
- May Day High
- Mile Gully High
- Mount St Joseph High School
- New Forest High
- Porus High
- Winston Jones High

Technical high

- Holmwood Technical High

Private high

- Sacred Heart
- St Michael's Institute
- Beaumont High
- Bethel Christian
- Victor Dixon High

=== Universities ===
There are several notable tertiary institutions, the Northern Caribbean University (NCU), a Seventh-day Adventist institution, formerly called West Indies College, the Church Teacher's College, Mandeville, The Catholic College, Knox Community College, Cobbla and Mandeville Campuses. There are also other religious-based institutions located in the parish: Regent College of the Caribbean (the former Jamaica Bible College) as well as Bethel Bible College.

== Notable people; Cultural Figures ==
- Donovan Bailey, retired Olympic sprinter
- Annastasia Baker, UK based Gospel, R&B, soul singer and songwriter
- Kemoy Campbell, distance runner, athlete
- Nesta Carter, athlete
- Alexander Worthy Clerk, Moravian missionary to the Gold Coast, now Ghana
- Ce'cile, musician
- Charmaine Crooks, Olympic athlete
- Paul R. Cunningham, Jamaican American surgeon
- General Degree, DJ
- Heavy D (born Dwight Arrington Myers), rapper
- Derrick Evans, "Mr. Motivator", fitness instructor
- Ijahman Levi, reggae musician
- Luciano, reggae musician
- Norman Washington Manley (1893 - 1969), Jamaica's first Premier and one of Jamaica's National Heroes.
- Winston McAnuff, reggae musician
- Pablo Moses, conscious roots reggae vocalist.
- Lovel Palmer, Jamaican and international footballer
- Sheryl Lee Ralph, actress and singer
- Ernest Ranglin OJ OD (born 19 June 1932), guitarist and composer, music director for Studio One and Island Records.
- Shenseea, dancehall musician
- Tony Rebel, reggae musician
- Garnett Silk, reggae musician
- Sherone Simpson, athlete
- Joy Spence, master blender
- Elaine Thompson, athlete
- Christopher Williams, athlete
