= Duncans, Jamaica =

Human settlement

Coordinates: 18°28′4″N 77°32′12″W

Location of Duncans in Jamaica

Duncans is a settlement in the Trelawny Parish in Jamaica. It has a parish courthouse.
