= Manchioneal, Jamaica =

Settlement in Portland, Jamaica

Coordinates: 18°02′19″N 76°16′53″W

Location of Manchioneal in Portland parish of Jamaica

Manchioneal is a settlement in Portland, Jamaica. It has a population of 2,292 as of 2009. It is located towards the eastern end in Portland Parish. The town got its name from the Manchioneel tree, a plant located exclusively along the coastline in the community. The major sources of income for residents are fishing and farming. The community has a bay (curve indentation of the coast) known as Manchioneal Bay, where fishing boats can be seen anchored along the shore. The community includes a school (Manchioneal Primary and Infant school), a post office, a police station and several churches. Major attractions in close proximity include Reach Falls and other nearby beaches.
