= Williamsfield, Jamaica =

Human settlement in Jamaica

Coordinates: 18.066°N 77.485°W

Location of Williamsfield in Jamaica

Williamsfield is a settlement in Manchester Parish, Jamaica.

== Williamsfield Estate ==
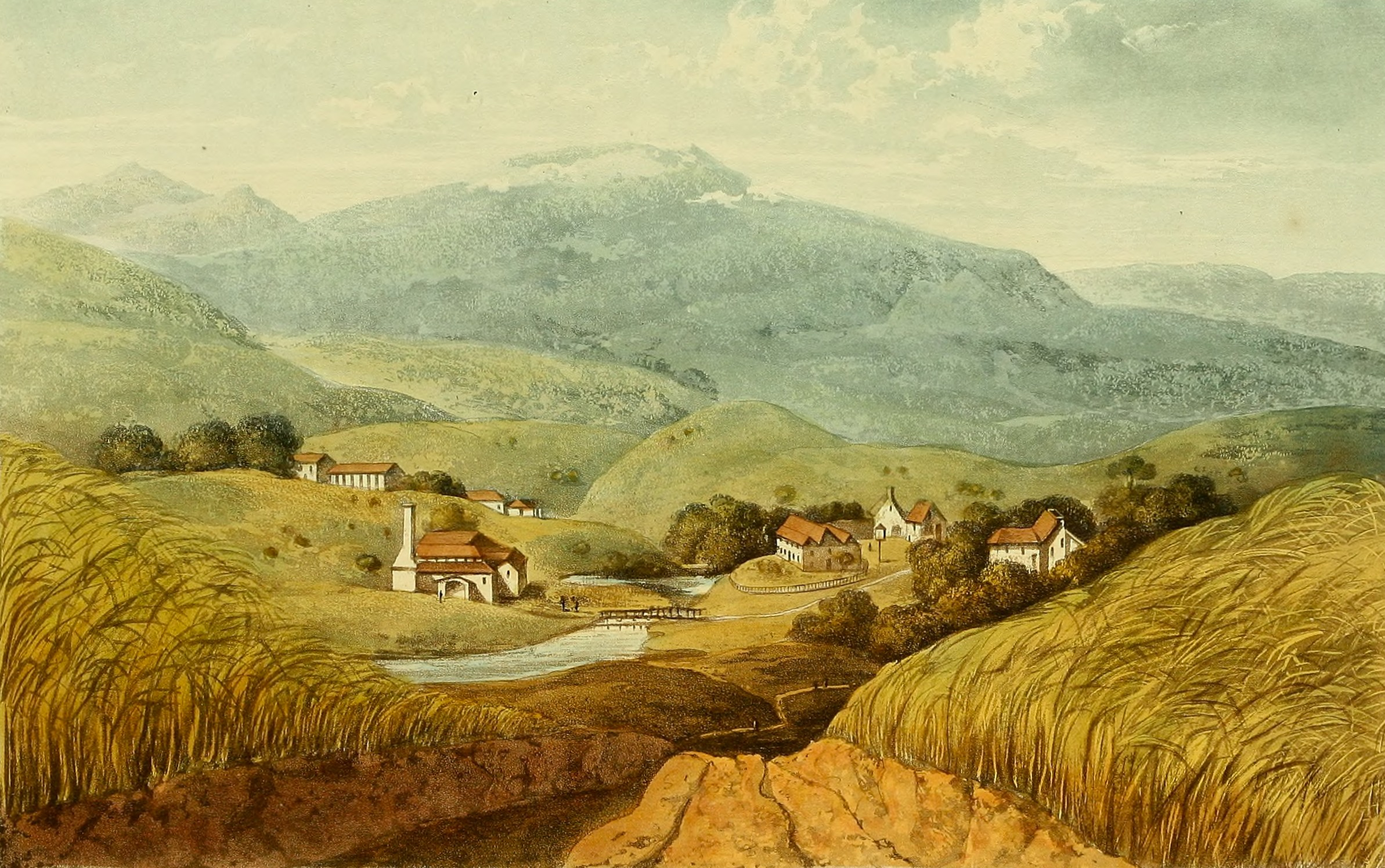
Illustration to A Picturesque Tour of the Island of Jamaica by James Hakewill

Williamsfield gets its name from the Williamsfield Estate which was a sugar plantation first established in the 1740s:

"according to what can be gathered from the old negroes (there being no early records), was first settled, nearly eighty years ago, by Mr. Needham, who was at that time a large proprietor in the Island; but while in its infancy (within three or four years after it was commenced), it was purchased by a Mr. Harvey, who came from Barbadoes, and was a merchant in Kingston"

== Demography ==
It has a population of 3,299 as of 2009.
