= Portmore, Saint Catherine =

Portmore 19
- City
- Nickname: Sunshine City
- Location within Jamaica
- Coordinates: 17.9499936°N 76.879921°W
- Country: Jamaica
- County: Middlesex
- Parish: Saint Catherine
- Founded: 1960
- Municipalities Act grants municipal status: 2003-05

Government

Population
  - Estimate (2011): 156,468
- Time zone: UTC-5 (EST)
- Area code: +1876
- Website: portmoremc.gov.jm

Portmore (Jamaican Patois: Puotmuor) is a city in southeastern Jamaica, located in the parish of St Catherine. It primarily serves as a commuter town for the capital city of Kingston.

== History ==
Portmore began as a large area for schematic residential development in the late 1960s, as the West Indies Home Contractors (WIHCON) organization built thousands of prototype housing units in an effort to alleviate the over-population of Kingston; the first was called Independence City.

Greater Portmore was developed in the early 1990s to address Kingston's housing crisis. Funded by the San Jose Accord, a Jamaica-Venezuela agreement, it used oil purchase loans to build 10,000 of 14,000 planned housing units in 1991, the largest in the English-speaking Caribbean. Michael Manley, then Prime Minister, secured the Accord, aligning with his social justice goals. The project reclaimed swamp land with canals to prevent flooding. It has amenities like malls and a library, remaining a key housing achievement.

Portmore was granted Municipality status in 2003 and has its own city council and mayor, following the British-based model of Jamaican local government. It now houses approximately 10% of the population of the Kingston Corporate Area.

On February 11, 2025, the Jamaican House of Representatives voted that Portmore be designated the 15th parish in Jamaica. This parliamentary action was ratified in the senate on February 28, 2025.

== Geography ==
Portmore is on the south coast in the Parish of St. Catherine. It is approximately 15 miles south-west of the capital of Kingston. It is divided into two regions, the plains to the north and the limestone hills of Hellshire to the south.

The most densely populated areas are located on low-lying reclaimed lands. Portmore consists of communities such as Old Portmore, Greater Portmore, Braeton and Hellshire. Portmore is one of the largest urban areas in St. Catherine with respect to human settlement, having a population 156,468(2001 census) and an annual growth rate of 4% since 1991. Greater Portmore is the largest housing development in the English-speaking Caribbean.

Portmore is built on a generally flat plain facing Kingston Harbour with an intricate canal system which prevents flooding. Much of the land is reclaimed swamp. Port Henderson Hill, formerly known as Salt Pond Hill, is visible from neighbouring parishes and was a possible Arawak grave site because the Arawak buried their dead in caverns, which Port Henderson Hill is riddled with. The most famous cave is named "Twin Sisters".

Formed through the amalgamation of various communities the city encompasses areas like Greater Portmore and even iconic destinations like Hellshire Beach. Some of the communities within Portmore include:

- Christian Gardens
- Caymanas Estate-Christian Pen
- Gregory Park
- Waterford
- Portsmouth
- Passage Fort
- Independent City
- Meadowvale
- Cedar Grove
- West Cumberland
- Cumberland
- Westchester
- Port Henderson-Fort Augusta
- Silverstone
- Portmore Pines
- Newland
- Naggo Head
- Southborough
- Westmeade
- Bridgeport
- Edgewater
- Bayside
- Braeton
- Caribbean Estates
- Old Braeton
- Monza
- Daytona
- Ascot
- Epsom
- Kensington
- West Aintree
- Belmont Park
- West Queens Park
- East Queens Park
- East Chedwin
- East Sabina
- West Sabina
- Hellshire

== Economy ==
While Portmore is not marketed as a tourist destination for the millions of incoming travelers to Jamaica every year, there are many places for entertainment, eating, relaxing and enjoyment such as beaches, restaurants, hotels and much more.

== Transportation ==
Portmore is connected to Kingston primarily via the Portmore Causeway (also known as the Portmore Toll Road or T2), a tolled roadway that crosses Kingston Harbour linking Newport West on the Kingston side to the Port Henderson area of Portmore in Saint Catherine Parish.

The causeway was originally built as the Cross Harbour Causeway, part of a 1967 land reclamation and development project intended to connect the newly developing Portmore area to Kingston. It rose out of the waters of Kingston Harbour and was officially opened to traffic on January 21, 1970, at the time considered a major infrastructural achievement for Jamaica.

As part of Phase 1A of the Highway 2000 project, the causeway was widened into a three-lane dual carriageway (six lanes total) and the adjoining Dyke Road was rehabilitated, with the upgraded corridor completed in June 2006. The upgraded route was subsequently brought into the TransJamaican Highway Limited (TJH) concession as T2, which also includes a large toll plaza serving traffic entering and leaving Portmore. T2 runs for approximately 6.5 kilometres (4.0 mi) between Dawkins Drive in Portmore and Marcus Garvey Drive in Kingston, crossing the parish line between Saint Catherine and Saint Andrew partway along its route.

Day-to-day toll operations along T2, as with the rest of the TransJamaican Highway network, are carried out by Jamaican Infrastructure Operators (JIO), while TJH holds the underlying concession, originally signed in November 2001 for 35 years and later amended and restated in January 2011.

In addition to the causeway, Portmore is served by local roads connecting it to nearby communities such as Greater Portmore and Waterford, as well as by public bus services operated by the Jamaica Urban Transit Company (JUTC), which run scheduled routes between Portmore and Downtown Kingston via the causeway.

== Sport ==
Portmore has a professional football team that plays in the top flight Jamaica National Premier League. It was originally Hazard United from May Pen but following its relocation is now called Portmore United F.C.

Since 2020, the tightly contested football match known as the Portmore derby involving Portmore United F.C. and Dunbeholden F.C.

Horse racing is popular and all major horse races are run at Caymanas Park located in north Portmore.

== Notable people ==
- Masicka (born 1993), dancehall singer and deejay
- Maalique Foster (born 1996), professional footballer
- Vybz Kartel (born 1976), dancehall singer and deejay
- Spice (born 1982), dancehall singer and deejay
- Popcaan (born 1988), dancehall singer and songwriter
- Floyd West (born 1980), contemporary Reggae roots singer and songwriter
