= Transport in Jamaica =

Transport in Jamaica consists of roadways, railways, ship and air transport, with roadways forming the backbone of the island's internal transport system.

== Roadways ==
The Jamaican road network consists of almost 21,000 kilometres of roads, of which over 15,000 kilometres are paved. The Jamaican Government has, since the late 1990s and in cooperation with private investors, embarked on a campaign of infrastructural improvement projects, one of which includes the creation of a system of freeways, the first such access-controlled roadways of their kind on the island, connecting the main population centres of the island. This project has so far seen the completion of 33 kilometres of freeway.

The Highway 2000 project, which seeks ultimately to link Kingston with Montego Bay and the north coast, is currently undergoing a series of phases/legs. Phase 1 is the highway network between Kingston and Mandeville, which itself has been divided into sub-phases: Phase 1a (Kingston-Bushy Park (in actuality, Kingston-Sandy Bay) highway and the upgrade of the Portmore Causeway), which was completed June 2006, and Phase 1b (Sandy Bay-Williamsfield). Phase 2a is the highway between Old Harbour and Ocho Rios, and Phase 2b is the highway between Mandeville and Montego Bay.

total: 18,700 km (11,620 mi).
paved: 13,100 km (8,140 mi).
unpaved: 5,600 km (3,480 mi) (1997 est.).

== Buses ==
The Jamaica Omnibus Service (JOS) was a municipal bus system that served the Kingston metropolitan area that ran from 1953 to 1983. After being run by British Electric Traction, the JOS was nationalised by the Jamaican government in 1974. It was replaced by a hodgepodge of privately operated buses, and a national bus system called the Jamaica Urban Transit Company (JUTC) was established in 1998 after complaints. The JUTC presently oversees more than 70 routes in areas including Kingston and Spanish Town.

Coaches are a notable means of travel in Jamaica; a popular privately operated coach service is the Knutsford Express. The JUTC also provides charter buses. As for minibuses and route taxis, PPV number plates indicate licensed public transport, whereas JUTA plates indicate tourist routes.

Having been proposed in 2019, the JUTC began testing floating solar electric buses in 2022, hoping to gradually introduce electric buses into the fleet and eventually phase out diesel buses.

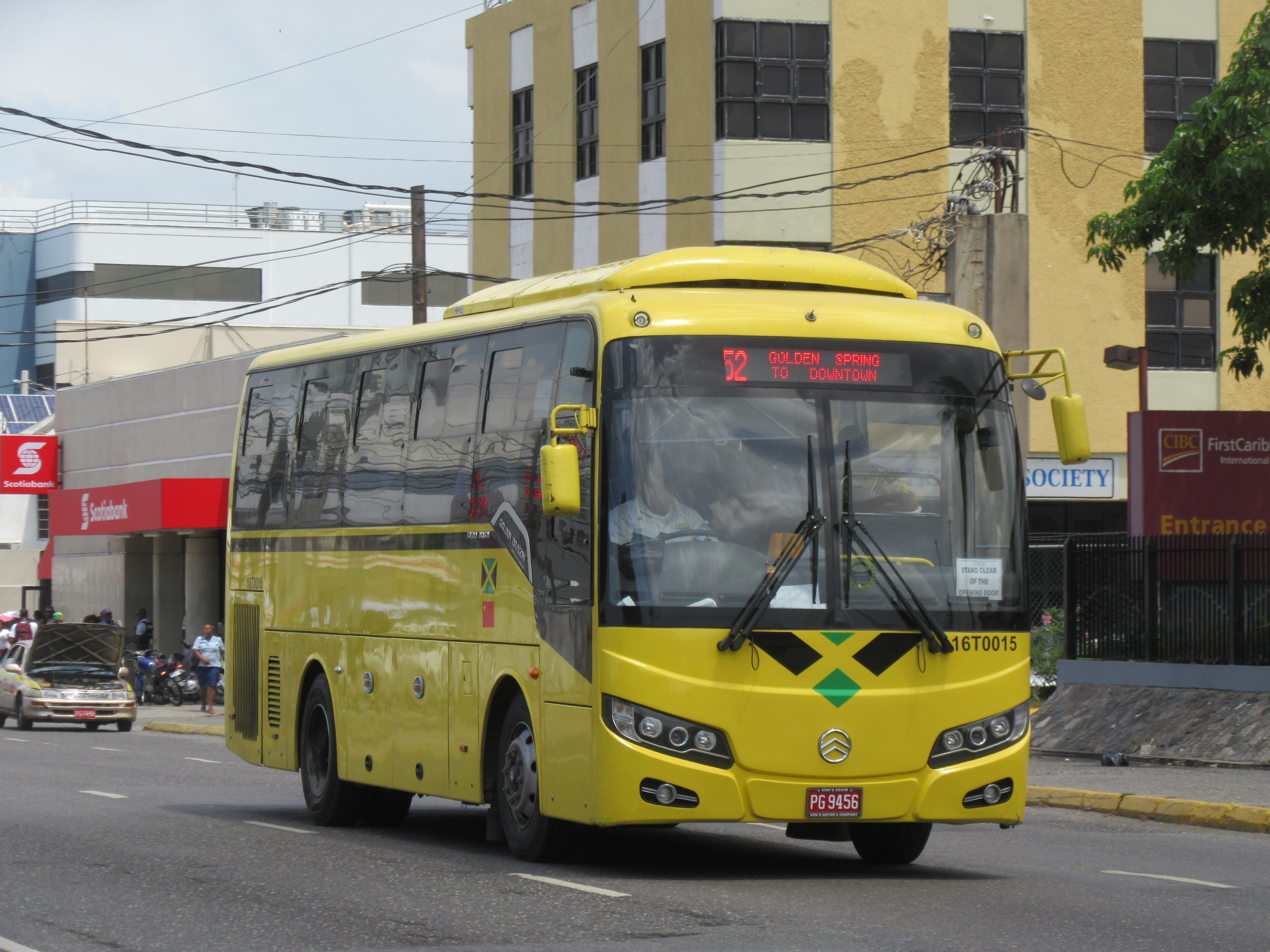
JUTC bus, 2016

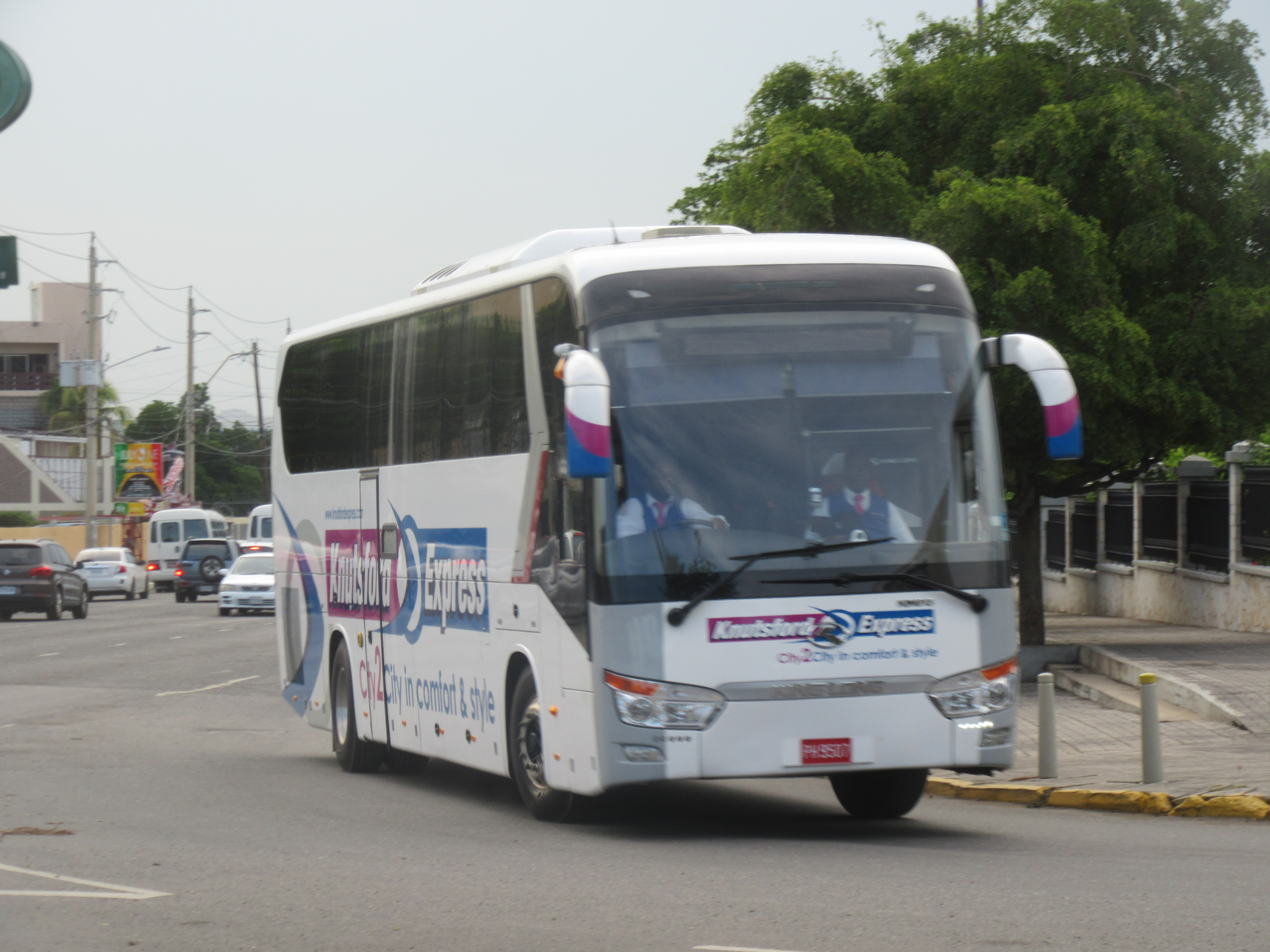
Knutford Express, 2018

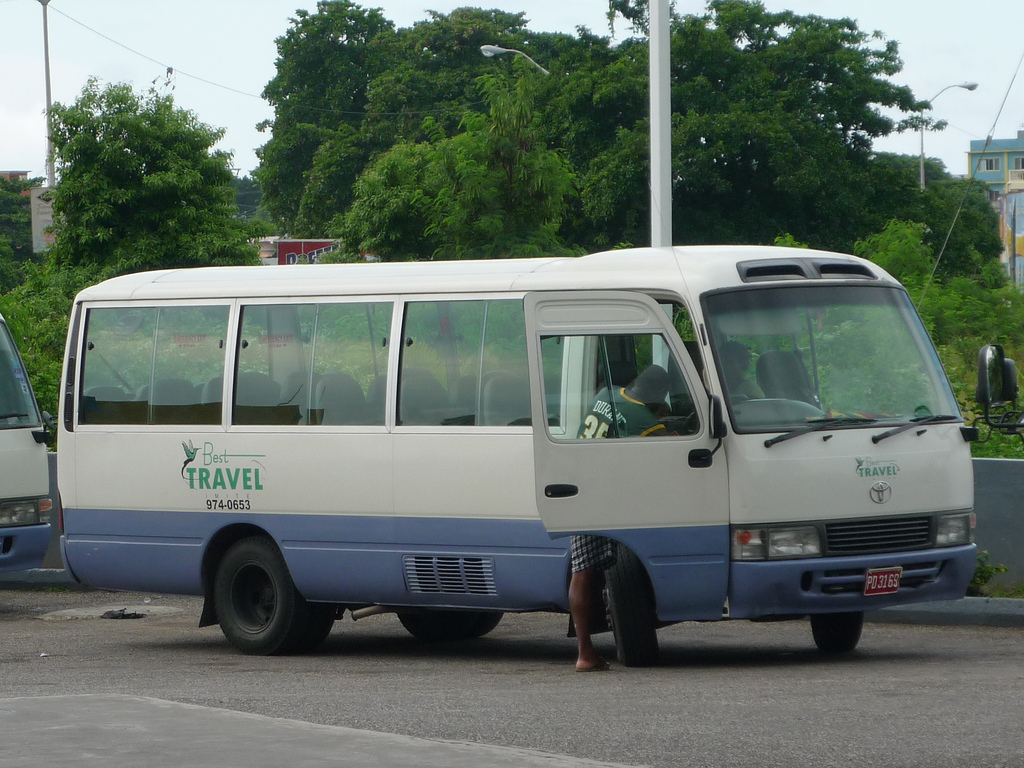
Minibus in Ocho Rios, 2009

== Railways ==
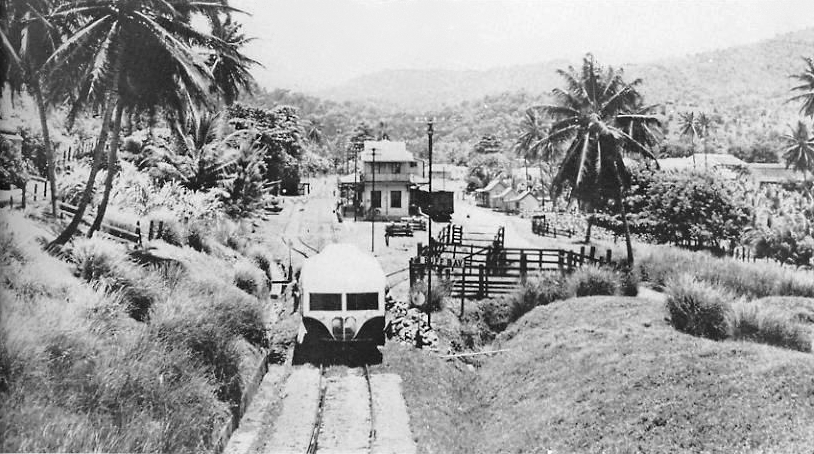
A motorized railcar leaving Buff Bay station, in 1960

Railways in Jamaica, as in many other countries, no longer enjoy the prominent position they once did, having been largely replaced by roadways as the primary means of transport. Of the 272 kilometres of railway found in Jamaica, only 57 kilometres remain in operation, currently used to transport bauxite.

In 2008, with increasing traffic congestion, moves are being made to reconstruct old railway lines.

total: 370 km
standard gauge: 370 km 1,435 mm (4 ft 8 1/2 in) gauge. Of these, 207 km belong to the Jamaica Railway Corporation in common carrier service but are no longer operational. The other 163 km is privately owned and used to transport bauxite.

== Air Transport ==
There are two international airports in Jamaica with modern terminals, long runways, and the navigational equipment required to accommodate the large jet aircraft used in modern air travel: Norman Manley International Airport in the capital, Kingston and Sangster International Airport in the resort city of Montego Bay. Both airports were once home to the country's (now defunct) national airline, Air Jamaica. In addition there are local commuter airports at Tinson Pen (Kingston), Port Antonio, Ocho Rios, Mandeville, and Negril that cater to internal flights only. The Ian Fleming International Airport opened in February 2011 to serve the Ocho Rios - Port Antonio area. Many other small, rural centres are served by private fields on sugar estates or bauxite mines.

== Ports and Shipping ==
Owing to its location in the Caribbean Sea in the shipping lane to the Panama Canal and relative proximity to large markets in North America and emerging markets in Latin America, Jamaica receives high container traffic. The container terminal at the Port of Kingston has undergone large expansion in capacity in recent years to handle growth both already realised as well as what is projected in coming years.

There are several other ports positioned around the island, including the alumina ports, Port Esquivel in St. Catherine (WINDALCO), Rocky Point in Clarendon and Port Kaiser in St. Elizabeth. Port Rhoades in Discovery Bay is responsible for transporting bauxite dried at the adjacent Kaiser plant. Reynolds Pier in Ocho Rios is responsible for exporting sugar. Montego Freeport in Montego Bay also handles a variety of cargo like (though more limited than) the Port of Kingston, mainly agricultural products. Boundbrook Port in Port Antonio exports bananas. There are also three cruise ship piers along the island, in Ocho Rios, Montego Bay and Port Antonio.

The Kingston port is situated in the Kingston Harbour, which is the 7th largest natural (i.e. not man made) harbour in the world.

== Merchant marine ==
- Total: 1 ship of over 1,000 GT: 1,930 GT/3,065 tonnes deadweight (DWT).
- Ships by type: petroleum tanker 1 (1999 est.).

== Lighthouses ==
As the island is a large exporter of bauxite, there is considerable freighter traffic. To aid navigation, Jamaica operates nine lighthouses

- Onshore: 7.
- Offshore: 2.

== Pipelines ==
Petroleum products: 10 km (6 mi).
