= Caribbean Maritime University =

Coordinates: 17.9461°N 76.7705°W

- CMU official logo
- Other names: CMU
- Motto: Redefining maritime excellence through innovation and technology.
- Type: Public, Private
- Established: 1980; 46 years ago
- Chancellor: HRM Drolor Bosso Adamtey I
- President: Professor Andrew Spencer
- Students: 3,000+
- Location: Kingston, Jamaica
- Campus: Palisadoes Park - Norman Manley Highway, Montego Bay Campus (Sam Sharpe (Western)), Port Royal(Customs and Immigration Faculty)
- Language: English
- Colors: Navy blue, Maroon, white and gold
- Website: cmu.edu.jm

The Caribbean Maritime University is a Jamaican higher education institution specialising in maritime education and training. Its primary campus is located on the Palisadoes, overlooking Kingston Harbour, with secondary campuses in Port Royal and in Montego Bay.

== History ==
=== The first two decades, 1980–2001 ===
In 1979, the governments of Jamaica and Norway formed a joint committee to examine the feasibility of opening a merchant marine training school in Jamaica. In an agreement signed on 2 May 1980, the Norwegian government granted 9 million Norwegian krone (3.1 million Jamaican dollars) for the development of the maritime sector, specifically for maritime training. The purpose of the institute was to train officers for the Jamaican merchant marine, a small fleet of ships owned by the government. Formally, these ships came under Jamaica Merchant Marine Limited and Jamaica Merchant Marine Atlantic Line Limited.

The Jamaica Maritime Training Institute (JMTI) began its first semester on 15 September 1980, with a student population of 16. It was located on Norman Road in Kingston, Jamaica. The institute was originally staffed by five Norwegian lecturers, and its first directors were from Norway. By 1983, the student population had grown to 26, with half engaged in nautical training and the other half in marine engineering. Only two students in the initial cohort were female. In 1985, the JMTI moved to Palisadoes Park, between the Royal Jamaica Yacht Club and Gun Boat Beach. It had a student population of 64 in 1990, at which point it announced a program of "Jamaicanisation" to reduce the reliance on Norwegian staff.

In the early 1990s, JMTI collaborated with the Human Employment and Resource Training Trust/National Training Agency (HEART/NTA) to provide training for ratings. It also began offering an expanded curriculum to parts of the maritime industry that were not seafarers, which it did in collaboration with the Pacific Maritime Training Institute, a campus of the British Columbia Institute of Technology (BCIT) in Canada.

The first two decades brought challenges, including the lack of sea time for cadets, and difficulties in finding qualified staff to teach. A solution to the latter problem was devised as promising candidates were fast-tracked through a Norwegian teaching program before joining the Institute. In 1994, a Diploma in International Shipping and Logistics was introduced in collaboration with BCIT, and in 1996 an Associate of Applied Science Degree in Industrial Systems, Operations and Maintenance was introduced in collaboration with the University of Technology in Jamaica. Further diplomas in transport, logistics, and marine engineering were also launched.

In January 1993, the Jamaica Maritime Institute Act was passed through the Parliament of Jamaica, providing a statutory basis for the Institute. Its name was legally changed to Jamaica Maritime Institute (JMI). The functions were set out: to provide training for officers and ratings, to provide training for shore-based industries, to hold examinations, to make awards, and to provide a resource centre "with a view to the development and maintenance of a vibrant shipping industry in the Caribbean region." In 2001, the act was amended to change the name to the Caribbean Maritime Institute (CMI), a decision made to reflect the regional nature of the student body and the training.

=== Caribbean Maritime Institute, 2001–2017 ===
Around the year 2000, the Institute began offering the Caribbean Diploma in Shipping Logistics as a distance-learning course to students from six Caribbean countries, through a collaboration with the University of the West Indies (UWI) Distance Education Centre and the Caribbean Shipping Association. 26 of the original 31 cohort graduated. In 2005, the student population of CMI was 394. The Institute's facilities were heavily damaged by Hurricane Dean in 2007. In 2008, the CMI planned to launch a Master of Science degree in International Shipping Management and Logistics, in collaboration with the Cyprus International Institute of Management. The Institute built up a number of international partnerships, for which it was praised by the Governor-General.

=== Caribbean Maritime University, 2017 onwards ===
In 2017, the Caribbean Maritime Institute was renamed the Caribbean Maritime University (CMU). In 2019, the president, Fritz Pinnock, was arrested on corruption and fraud charges; he resigned in April 2022. Andrew Spencer was appointed as president to replace him, having most recently been deputy director of the Mona School of Business and Management at the University of the West Indies.

== Buildings and sites ==
The main campus of the CMU has been at Palisadoes Park, on the Palisadoes, since 1985. There is also a campus at Port Royal, which delivers Bachelor of Science courses. CMU operates satellite locations at Sam Sharpe Teachers College, Montego Bay, Knox Community College, Mandeville, and Moneague College, Moneague. At the satellite locations, CMU delivers specific undergraduate programs.

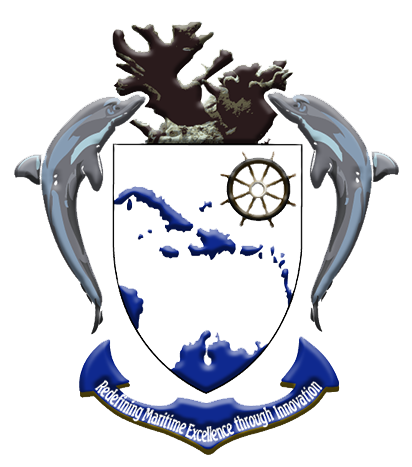
Former Logo

== Organisation ==
=== Leadership and governance ===
==== List of directors/presidents ====
- Michael Rodriguez, 1992–2006
- Fritz Pinnock, 2006–2022
- Andrew Spencer, 2022–present

Under the Caribbean Maritime University Act, CMU has a Council and Academic Board. The former is the ultimate authority in the governance of the university, while the latter holds responsibility for academic affairs.

=== Faculties ===
CMU has four faculties:

- Faculty of Engineering and Applied Technology (FEAT): industrial systems, industrial automation, mechatronics, marine biotechnology, artificial intelligence and computer studies
- Faculty of Marine and Nautical Sciences (FMNS): nautical studies, marine engineering, marine transport
- Faculty of Shipping and Logistics (FSL): shipping, logistics, port management, and customs
- Faculty of General Studies (FGS): language, communication, and humanities
