= T3 road (Jamaica) =

Highway in Jamaica

T3
- Edward Seaga Highway
- T3 highlighted in blue

Route information
- Maintained by Jamaica North South Highway Company Limited (JNSH), a subsidiary of China Harbour Engineering Company (CHEC)
- Length: 66.47 km (41.30 mi)
- Existed: 2016–present
- History: The North-South Leg of Highway 2000 was constructed from 2012 to 2016 and renamed in honor of Edward Seaga in June 2018

Major junctions
- South end: Mandela Highway near Central Village, Saint Catherine
- Angels; Linstead/Ewarton; Golden Grove/Claremont; Moneague
- North end: A3 at Drax Hall, Saint Ann

Location
- Country: Jamaica
- Parishes: Saint Catherine, Saint Ann

Highway system
- Roads in Jamaica
← T2

T3, officially the Edward Seaga Highway, named after former Jamaican prime minister Edward Seaga, is a tolled controlled-access highway forming the North–South Leg of Highway 2000, Jamaica's ongoing national highway development project. The highway runs for approximately 66.47 kilometres (41.30 mi) between the Mandela Highway near Central Village, in the parish of Saint Catherine, and a junction with the A3 at Drax Hall, in the parish of Saint Ann. T3 is one of three component legs of the Highway 2000 project, alongside the East–West Leg (T1) and the Portmore Causeway (T2).

Before the construction of T3, the main route between Kingston and Ocho Rios was the A1, a winding, mountainous road that climbed over Mount Rosser, passed through the Bog Walk Gorge, and crossed the historic Flat Bridge, resulting in considerably longer travel times. Construction of the North–South Leg began in December 2012, undertaken by the Chinese firm China Harbour Engineering Company (CHEC) and financed by a $425.5 million loan from the China Development Bank. The first section to open to traffic was the 19.3 km Mount Rosser Bypass, on August 5, 2014; toll collection began on September 6, 2015, and the highway was officially opened in full on March 23, 2016.

The North–South Leg was renamed the Edward Seaga Highway in June 2018, in honor of former prime minister Edward Seaga, during an official ceremony held at Unity Valley, Moneague, in Saint Ann Parish, with Prime Minister Andrew Holness presiding. The highway is a four-to-six-lane controlled-access, tolled motorway with grade-separated interchanges, including those at Angels, Linstead/Ewarton, Golden Grove/Claremont, and Moneague, as well as a rest stop and service area at Unity Valley.The highway is operated by the Jamaica North South Highway Company Limited (JNSH), a subsidiary of CHEC.

== Route description ==
Diagrammatic sign of an exit towards Angels in T3 motorway

T3 begins at a directional interchange with the Mandela Highway near Central Village and Caymanas, in Saint Catherine Parish, just north of Spanish Town. From there, the highway heads north through mostly rural and forested terrain, running along the eastern edge of the Caymanas area before reaching the Angels interchange, which provides access to the A1 and the community of Angels.

North of Angels, T3 runs roughly parallel to the A1 and the Rio Cobre, passing near Bog Walk before curving northwest through the Mount Rosser Bypass, a mountainous section built to avoid the steep grades and hairpin turns of the original A1 route over Mount Rosser. The highway then reaches the Linstead/Ewarton interchange, providing access to the towns of Linstead and Ewarton.

Continuing north, T3 climbs through the interior highlands of Saint Catherine and Saint Ann parishes, reaching the Golden Grove/Claremont interchange, which connects to the Golden Grove–Drax Hall Road, the community of Golden Grove (Lydford), and Claremont. The highway then passes near Faith's Pen, a well-known roadside food stop along the corridor, before reaching the Moneague interchange, near the town of Moneague, which includes a rest stop and service area at Unity Valley.

From Moneague, T3 descends toward the north coast through the community of Governors Hill, before terminating at a directional interchange with the A3 (Northern Coastal Highway) at Drax Hall, in Saint Ann Parish, between St Ann's Bay and Ocho Rios. At this northern terminus, T3 also crosses the original A1 road, which continues along the coast toward Ocho Rios and Montego Bay.

== History ==
Before the construction of T3, the main route between Kingston and the north coast was the A1, a winding, mountainous road that climbed over Mount Rosser, passed through the Bog Walk Gorge, and crossed the historic Flat Bridge over the Rio Cobre. This route was notoriously slow and prone to landslides and flooding, particularly in the gorge section, leading to frequent closures and long detours for traffic travelling between Kingston and Ocho Rios.

Planning for a controlled-access North–South Leg of Highway 2000 to bypass this route dates back to the original conception of the Highway 2000 project in the late 1990s, though construction did not begin until over a decade later. In December 2012, work began on the new highway, undertaken by the Chinese state-owned firm China Harbour Engineering Company (CHEC) and financed through a $425.5 million loan from the China Development Bank.

The highway was completed in phases. The first section to open, a 19.1 km stretch from the Linstead Bypass to Moneague that included the Mount Rosser Bypass, opened to traffic on August 5, 2014, initially without a connection to the old A1 at Mount Diablo Road. The remaining sections, from Caymanas to Linstead and from Moneague to Ocho Rios, were completed by December 2015 and opened to traffic in March 2016, completing the full length of the North–South Leg. Toll collection on the completed highway began on September 6, 2015, ahead of the final phases opening to traffic.

Upon completion, the North–South Leg was operated by the Jamaica North South Highway Company Limited (JNSH), a subsidiary of CHEC, under a concession agreement with the Jamaican government. In June 2018, the highway was renamed the Edward Seaga Highway, in honor of former prime minister Edward Seaga, during an official ceremony held at Unity Valley, Moneague, in Saint Ann Parish, with Prime Minister Andrew Holness presiding.

== Interchanges ==
The entire route is located in the parishes of Saint Catherine and Saint Ann.

T3 motorway
Parish	Town	mi	km	Destinations	Notes
Saint Catherine	Central Village	0.00	0.0	Mandela Highway	Southern terminus
Saint Catherine	Caymanas	0.31	0.5	Caymanas Park toll plaza	
Saint Catherine	Angels	5.47	8.8	Access road to A1 – Angels, Bog Walk	Toll plaza at entrance
Saint Catherine	Bog Walk	6.52	10.5	Bridge over Rio Cobre	
Saint Catherine	Linstead	16.65	26.8	Access road to A1 – Linstead, Moneague	Toll plaza at entrance
Saint Ann	Moneague	26.66	42.9	A1 – Linstead, Moneague	Rest stop
Saint Ann	Golden Grove	32.87	52.9	Access road to A1 – Golden Grave, Drax Hill	Toll plaza at entrance
Saint Ann	Golden Grove	33.93	54.6	Mammee Bay toll plaza	
Saint Ann	Drax Hall	41.30	66.47	A3 – Drax Hall Roundabout	Northern terminus
1.000 mi = 1.609 km; 1.000 km = 0.621 mi Toll
