= Highway 2000 (Jamaica) =

Highway system in Jamaica

- Edward Seaga Highway, PJ Patterson Highway
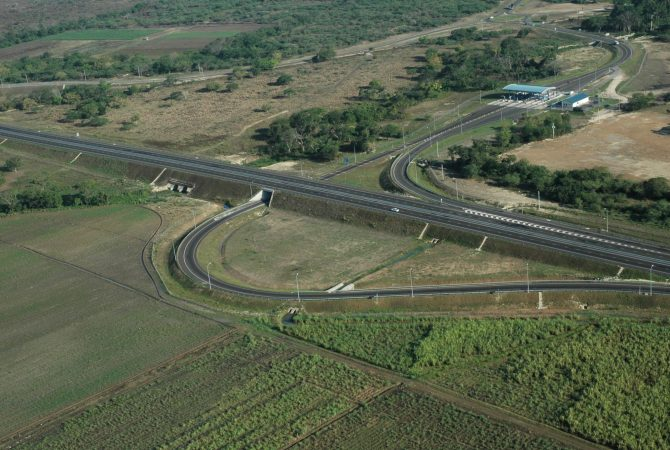

Route information
- Maintained by Jamaica Infrastructure Operator (JIO)
- Length: 149.7 km (93.0 mi)
- Existed: 2003–present
- Component highways: T1, T2, T3

Major junctions
- From: Mandela Highway (T1 and T3) Dyke Road (T2) Port Henderson Drive (T2) Dawkin Road (T2)
- North-South Leg: Mammee Bay Interchange; Lydford/Golden Grove Interchange; Unity Hall Interchange; Linstead Interchange; Angels Interchange; Mandela/Caymanas Interchange; East-West Leg: Mineral Heights Interchange; May Pen Interchange; Toll Gate Interchange; Porus/Williams Field Interchange; Vineyards/ Old Harbour Interchange; Spanish Town Interchange; Portmore Interchange
- To: Melrose Bypass (T1) (as of August 2023) Glenmuir Road Round-a-bout (T1) (since 2012) Marcus Garvey Drive (T2) Mammee Bay/ Ocho Rios (T3)

Location
- Country: Jamaica

Highway system
- Roads in Jamaica

Highway 2000 is a highway system in Jamaica connecting Kingston, with Ocho Rios and a planned connection to Montego Bay, passing through the parishes of St. Catherine, Saint Ann, Clarendon and proposed sections through St. James, Saint Elizabeth, Westmoreland, Hanover.

The National Road Operating and Constructing Company (NROCC) is the state-owned entity responsible for overseeing the highway's operation. The East-West Leg is managed by TransJamaican Highway Limited (TJH) and Jamaica Infrastructure Operators (JIO), while the North-South Leg is operated by the Jamaica North South Highway Company Limited (JNSH), a subsidiary of China Harbour Engineering Company Limited (CHEC). The highway was through contractors CHEC and Bouygues Construction.

The highway is a four-to-six lane controlled-access, tolled motorway with grade-separated interchanges and intersections built according to modern international standards. Tolling of the highway is governed by a Tolling Policy.

The highway was built on a phased basis. Phases 1A and 1B are considered as the East-West Leg (T1) and Portmore Causeway (T2). Phase 2A is considered as the North-South Leg (T3).

On September 15, 2009, Jamaica's then prime minister, Bruce Golding, announced to Parliament that Highway 2000 was to be renamed in honour of Usain Bolt, however, Bolt decided to reject the honour.

== History ==
The Highway 2000 construction project was initialized by Government of Jamaica (former Prime Minister P.J. Patterson) in September 1999. The main objective of this project was to upgrade Jamaica's infrastructure, provide economic opportunities for growth and create jobs. The Project is a public-private partnership structured to maximize operational efficiency and minimize costs. The project is still ongoing, with the direct link to Montego Bay yet to be determined.

The intention of connecting Jamaica via such a comprehensive highway system, was first expressed and clearly defined in the Jamaican Transportation Survey of 1968/69; much of the current Highway 2000 alignments were proposed and defined therein, including the phase 1, East-West Leg and Portmore Causeway, phase 2, North-South Leg as well as a proposal to connect the East-West Leg to Montego Bay. The proposed highway system was also included and adopted in the National Physical Plan for Jamaica 1970-90 with suggestions to have an alternate North-South Leg from May Pen to Discovery Bay as opposed to the one actually constructed (at present) from Caymanas to Ocho Rios. The NPP was a non-partisan Plan for Jamaica, first conducted under the United Nations Special Fund Project "Assistance in Physical Planning". The plan was drafted by the then Town Planning Department (now NEPA) of the Ministry of Finance and Planning, and vetted by the then Prime Minister of Jamaica, Hugh Shearer, as well as then Minister of Finance and Planning, Edward Seaga.

== Phases ==
The project is divided into two phases, with the second phase being further divided into two.

=== Phase 1A (~46 km) ===
- Bushy Park to Sandy Bay (13 km) - completed February 2004
- Kingston to Bushy Park (21 km) - completed December 2004
- Portmore - Kingston Causeway (5 km) - completed July 2006

=== Phase 1B (~10.5 km) ===
- Sandy Bay to May Pen (10.5 km) - completed August 15, 2012

=== Phase 1C (~27.5 km) ===
- May Pen to Williamsfield (27.5 km)— completed September 15, 2023

=== Phase 2A (~67 km) ===
The 67 km, Highway 2000 North-South Leg, has reduced travel time from Kingston to the North Coast town of Ocho Rios and the city of Montego Bay significantly. The construction took place in 3 phases:

1. Mount Rosser Bypass (19.3 km) - completed August 5, 2014

2. Caymanas to Linstead (May 2013 to December 2015) - Opened March 2016

3. Moneague to Ocho Rios (June 2013 to December 2015) - Opened March 2016

=== Phase 2B ===
Williamsfield to Montego Bay—general alignment not yet clearly defined

== Route Information ==
=== Saint Ann ===
The highway's North-South Leg begins in St. Ann at the Mammee Bay interchange which links T3 with the Northern Coastal Highway (which links Mammee Bay/Ochi Rios with Montego Bay). The highway cuts through the interior of the parish and has 2 additional interchanges (Lydford and Unity Valley) which have tolled on/off ramps and a rest stop at Unity Valley. The highway then transitions into St. Catherine (January 9, 2026 01:00:00am - 23:59:59pm).

=== Saint Catherine ===
The highway's North-South Leg and East-West Leg run through the parish of St. Catherine. The highway's significance is especially seen in the parish. The predecessor of the North-South Leg - T3 (Mammee Bay to Caymanas) was the A1, which involved passing through Mount Rosser, the Bog Walk Gorge and over The Flat Bridge. These areas were notorious for their particularly long travel times, in addition to the winding path through Mt. Rosser and the inaccessibility of the Bog Walk Gorge (which runs parallel to the Rio Cobre river) and Flat Bridge during adverse weather conditions. The highway bypasses these areas via the Mt. Rosser Bypass and the Linstead to Angels section of the highway and minimizes the total journey time from Kingston to Ocho Rios from over 2 hours to under an hour.

The East-West portion of the highway (T1) goes from the Vineyards Toll Booth (in the Parish) to Mineral Heights/Glenmuir road toll booth in Clarendon.

The T2 or Portmore Causeway goes from the parish of Kingston and into St. Catherine (more specifically, Portmore) (March 17, 2026 01:00:00am - 23:59:59pm).

=== Kingston ===
The Highway's T2 leg called the Portmore Causeway begins on Marcus Garvey Drive and ends on Dawkins Drive (for northwest and southwest bound traffic) and Dyke Road (which carries traffic North and links the causeway with T1 by circumnavigating the periphery of the heavily populated Kingston conurbation of Portmore).

=== Saint Andrew ===
Though the highway has no formal presence in the parish of St. Andrew, the Washington Boulevard leads onto Mandela Highway and vice versa - after the interchange leading to either New Kingston (Uptown, located in St. Andrew) or Downtown & the Airport (located in Kingston Parish). Mandela Highway has on and off ramps to all sections of the highway.

=== Clarendon ===
The highway's East-West Leg (T1) runs through Clarendon, connecting the parish with St. Catherine and Manchester. A significant interchange is located at the Mineral Heights/Glenmuir Road, where a toll booth marks the primary entry and exit point for vehicles. This section of the highway is crucial for enhancing transportation across the island, particularly for those traveling between Kingston and the western regions.

The highway's presence has accelerated residential development, especially in the parish capital, May Pen, which is increasingly becoming a commuter town for people working in Kingston and other urban centers.

=== Manchester ===
In Manchester, the highway's East-West Leg (T1) continues from Clarendon and provides a vital link to the western parts of Jamaica, and is proposed to be extended to Montego Bay, a major tourism hub. The entry of the highway into Manchester reduces travel time significantly, making it more convenient for commuters traveling between the southern and northern coasts, particularly from Kingston to Mandeville, the capital of Manchester. The completion of this highway section has enhanced the connectivity between central and western Jamaica, benefiting both residents and visitors.

=== St. James ===
TBD
