= Rio Cobre Dam =

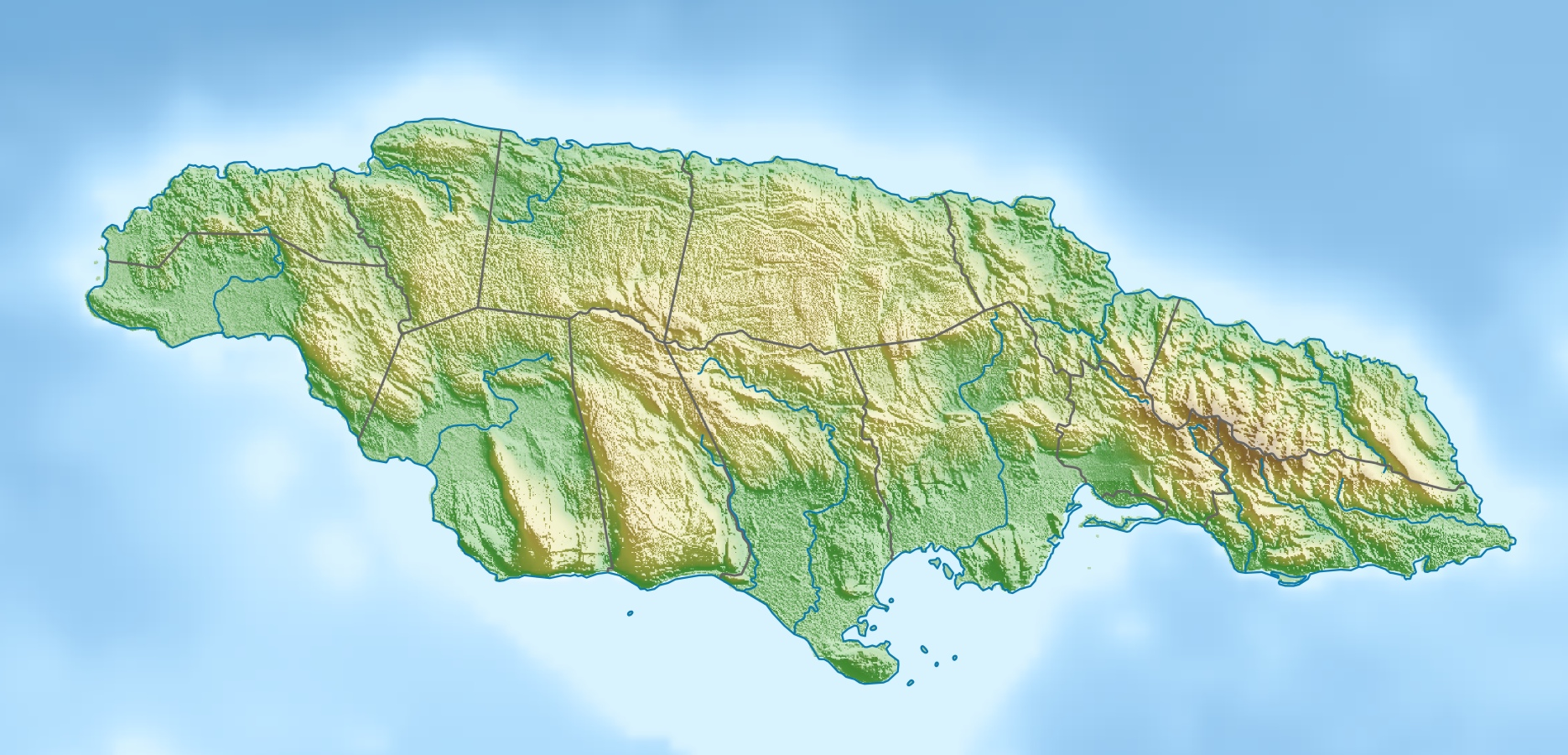
- Location within Jamaica
- Country: Jamaica
- Location: Spanish Town, Saint Catherine Parish
- Coordinates: 18°2′40.22″N 76°58′49.64″W
- Purpose: Irrigation
- Status: Operational
- Construction began: 1872
- Opening date: 1876; 150 years ago
- Owner: National Irrigation Commission

Dam and spillways
- Type of dam: Gravity, diversion
- Impounds: Rio Cobre
- Height: 9 m (30 ft)

The Rio Cobre Dam is a diversion dam on the Rio Cobre near Spanish Town in Saint Catherine Parish, Jamaica. It is owned by the National Irrigation Commission. The primary purpose of the dam is to divert water into a canal on its right bank for the irrigation of up to 12,000 ha (30,000 acres) to the south. It also provides municipal water to Spanish Town. The scheme contains more than 48 km (30 mi) of canals and waters sugar cane, bananas and cattle.

Plans for the scheme began with then Governor of Jamaica John Peter Grant in 1870. Construction began at the end of 1872 and by June 1876 the dam and canals were complete.

In the late 1800s the West India Electric Company constructed a 900 kW hydroelectric power station upstream at Bog Walk to power a tram system in Kingston. On 24 June 1904, while workers were cleaning the station's penstock, water was accidentally released down it killing 33 of them. The power station was closed in 1966, 62 years after the accident but, the dam, the ruins of the turbine house and some of the concrete supports of the penstock still exist today.

== See also ==
- Hermitage Dam
