= Cagway Bay =

Bay in Jamaica

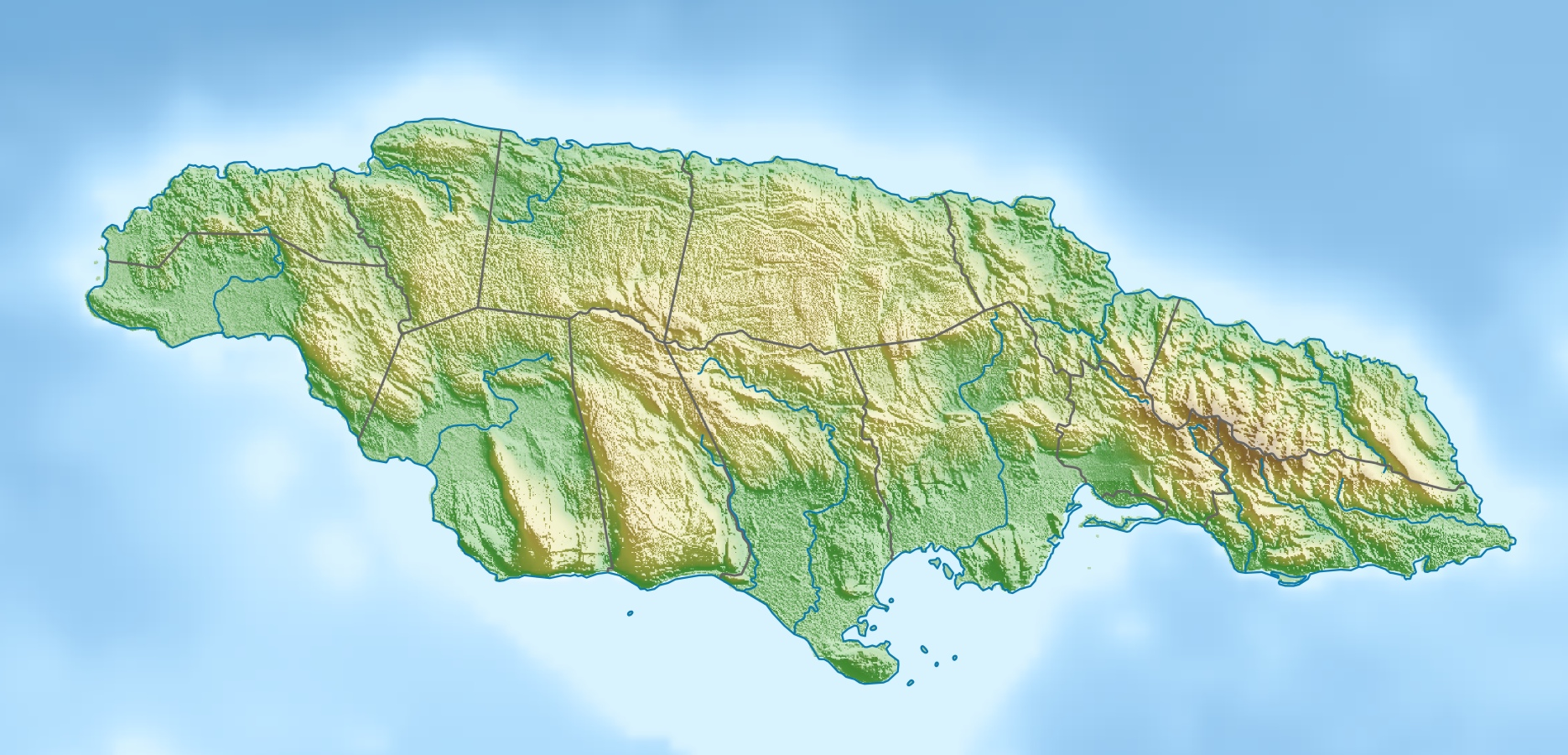
- Location in Jamaica
- Location: Kingston Harbour
- Coordinates: 17.9564°N 76.8405°W
- Basin countries: Jamaica

Cagway Bay as the English called it following their arrival in Jamaica during the invasion of 1655 had been known to the earlier Taino and Spanish occupiers as Caguay or Caguaya bay.

The bay in turn got its name from the Taino name for the sand spit now known as the Palisadoes which protects the bay or, as it is now known as, Kingston Harbour. Edward Long argued in his 1744 History of Jamaica argues that the names were "a corruption of caragua, the Indian name for coratoe, or great aloe, which overspreads the adjacent Saltpan Hill".

== See also ==
- Port Royal
