= Hermitage Dam =

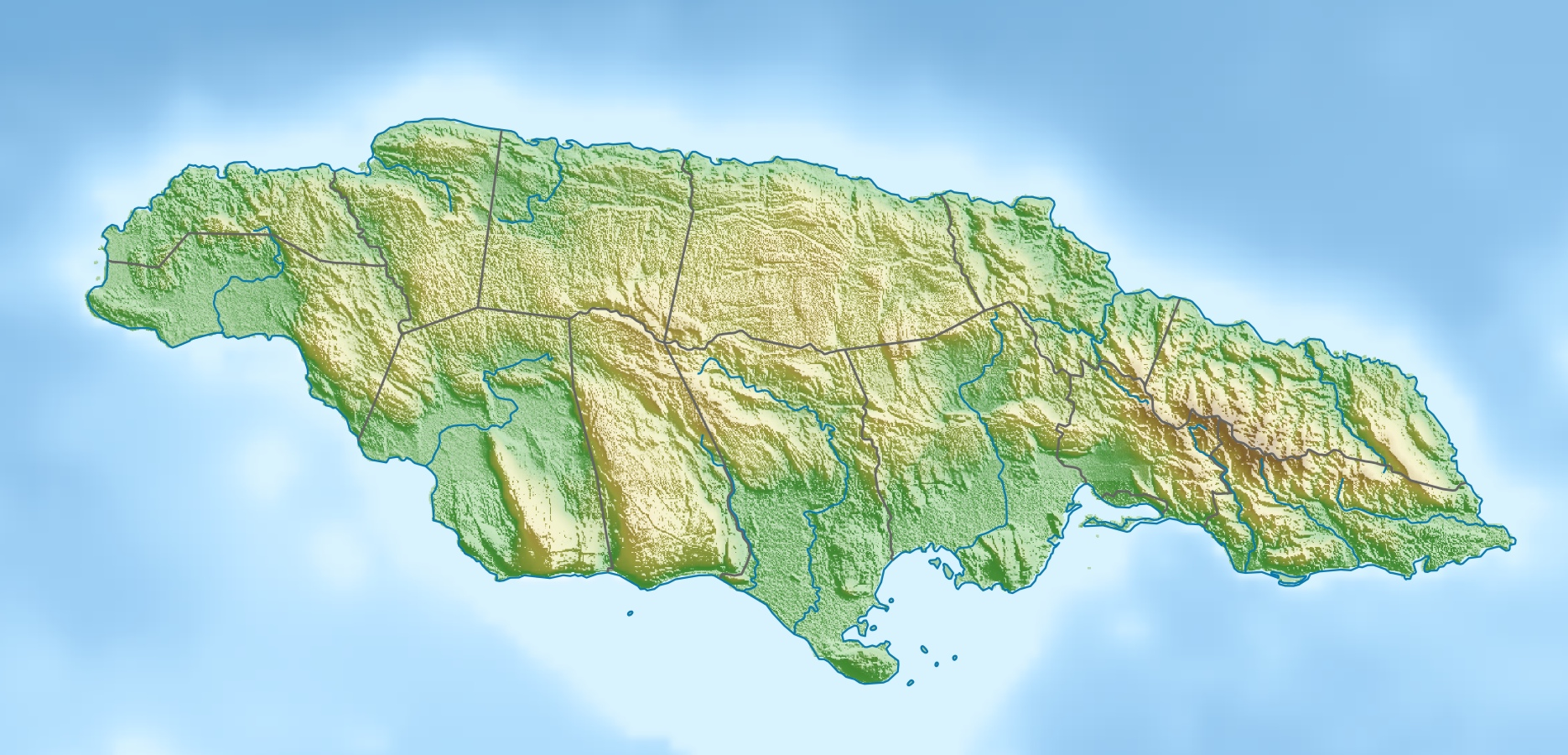
- Location within Jamaica
- Country: Jamaica
- Location: Stony Hill, Saint Andrew Parish
- Coordinates: 18°5′2.45″N 76°46′12.83″W
- Purpose: Municipal water
- Status: Operational
- Construction began: 1924
- Opening date: 1927; 99 years ago
- Owner: National Irrigation Commission

Dam and spillways
- Type of dam: Gravity
- Impounds: Wag Water River
- Height: 43 m (141 ft)
- Length: 142 m (466 ft)

Reservoir
- Creates: Hermitage Reservoir
- Total capacity: 1,740,000 m^{3} (1,410 acre⋅ft)

The Hermitage Dam is a concrete gravity dam on the Wag Water River near Stony Hill in Saint Andrew Parish, Jamaica. The primary purpose of the dam is to provide municipal water to nearby Kingston and Saint Andrew Parish. Construction on the dam began in 1924 and it was inaugurated on 4 May 1927. The dam is owned by the National Water Commission.

== See also ==
- Rio Cobre Dam
