= Flat Bridge =

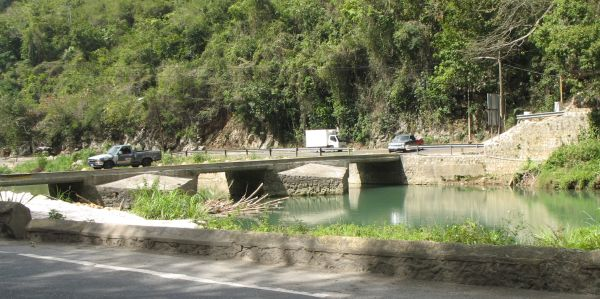
- Coordinates: 18°03′40.50″N 76°59′04″W
- Carries: 1 lane
- Crosses: Rio Cobre
- Locale: Jamaica, St. Catherine Parish

Characteristics
- Design: Beam Bridge
- Total length: 45 metres (148 ft)
- Width: 4 metres (13 ft)
- Longest span: 32 metres (105 ft)
- Clearance above: unlimited

History
- Opened: around 1770; 256 years ago

Statistics
- Toll: none

Location
- Interactive map of Flat Bridge

The Flat Bridge is a beam bridge across the Rio Cobre on the A1 road connecting the Jamaican capital Kingston, with the north coast tourist areas of Dunn's River and Ocho Rios. It is one of the oldest bridges in Jamaica.

== History ==
While it cannot be positively ascertained when this bridge was built, it was definitely constructed after 1724. Edward Long describes it in his History of Jamaica printed in 1774:

This bridge is flat and composed of planks on frame of timberwork which rests upon two piers and two buttresses projecting from the banks, constructed with piles and braces interlaced with masonry.

When the bridge was being constructed, the sixteen plantations in the Bog Walk area were obliged to send one slave in every fifty to work on the River Road, sometimes called Sixteen Mile Walk. Gravel, marl, lime, sand and stone had to be dug. Slaves often lost their lives as they performed dangerous tasks in the Gorge. Contracts for timber and for masons to work on the bridge were authorized at vestry meetings.

Between 1881 and 1915, the floor of the bridge was washed away and later re-floored with iron girders and buckle plates taken from the original flooring of the May Pen bridge. Today, the bridge of three spans is supported by two piers and two abutments. In the 1930s it had metal handrails and later wooden ones, but these were devoured by the river at different times. Hemispheres of stone are now the only protection on the bridge itself.

== Traffic ==
Flat Bridge is a part of the busy A1 road and carries a single lane so traffic is managed by traffic lights.

The bridge is often flooded after heavy rains. In such times, motorists are advised to take alternative routes through Barry and Sligoville.
