= Moneague =

- Small Town
- View of the destruction on Moneague lake during the 2006 flood

- Location within Jamaica
- Coordinates: 18°16′11″N 77°06′56″W
- Country: Jamaica
- Parish: Saint Ann

Moneague is a small town in Saint Ann, Jamaica on the main road between Kingston and Ocho Rios.

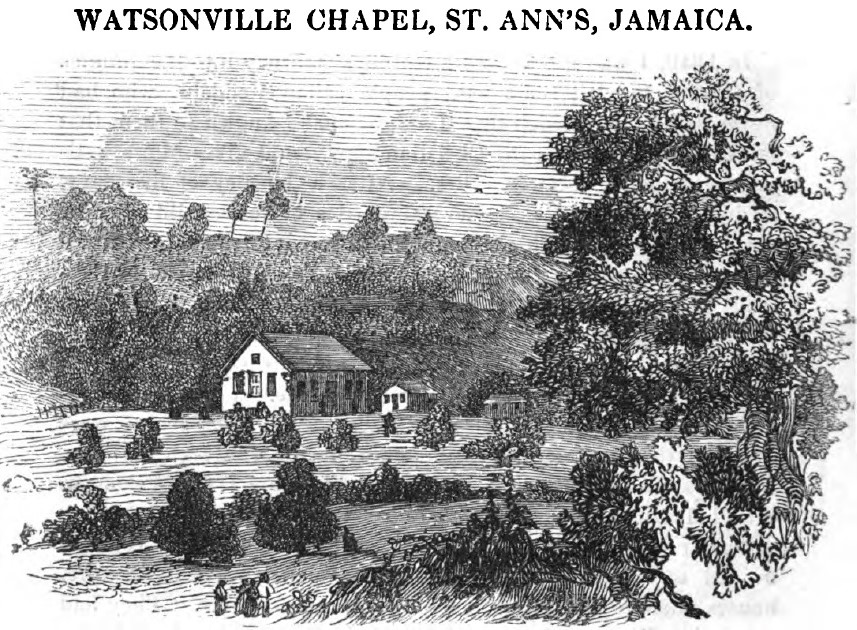
Watsonville Chapel, St. Anns's Jamaica (1850)

In the colonial days, the town prospered as a stopover for the rich English on their journey.

Moneague is the location of the Jamaica Defence Force Moneague Training Camp originally developed by the British for the West India Regiment. This facility includes an airstrip.

The main attractions in the town are Moneague College (which is housed in the former colonial-era Moneague Hotel) and Moneague Lake. In 2006, the lake became the subject of headline news as it flooded its banks, destroying much local property.

== Transportation ==
Moneague is served primarily by the A1, which passes directly through the town along Main Street, connecting it to Ocho Rios to the north and Linstead and Spanish Town to the south.

To the west and south of the town, T3, the Edward Seaga Highway, bypasses Moneague, heading towards nearby towns such as Linstead and Golden Grave. A rest stop and service area serving the highway is located at the United Valley/Moneague interchange, which is connected to an access road that charges a toll at the entrance to the highway. This access road connects with the A1 (Linstead-Moneague road).
