= Wag Water River =

Coordinates: 18°16′N 76°47′W

Location
- Country: Jamaica

The Wag Water River (correct name is Agualta River) is one of Jamaica's rivers. It is dammed by the Hermitage Dam.

== See also ==
- List of rivers of Jamaica
