= Moneague College =

College in Moneague, Saint Ann, Jamaica

Coordinates: 18.2767°N 77.1144°W

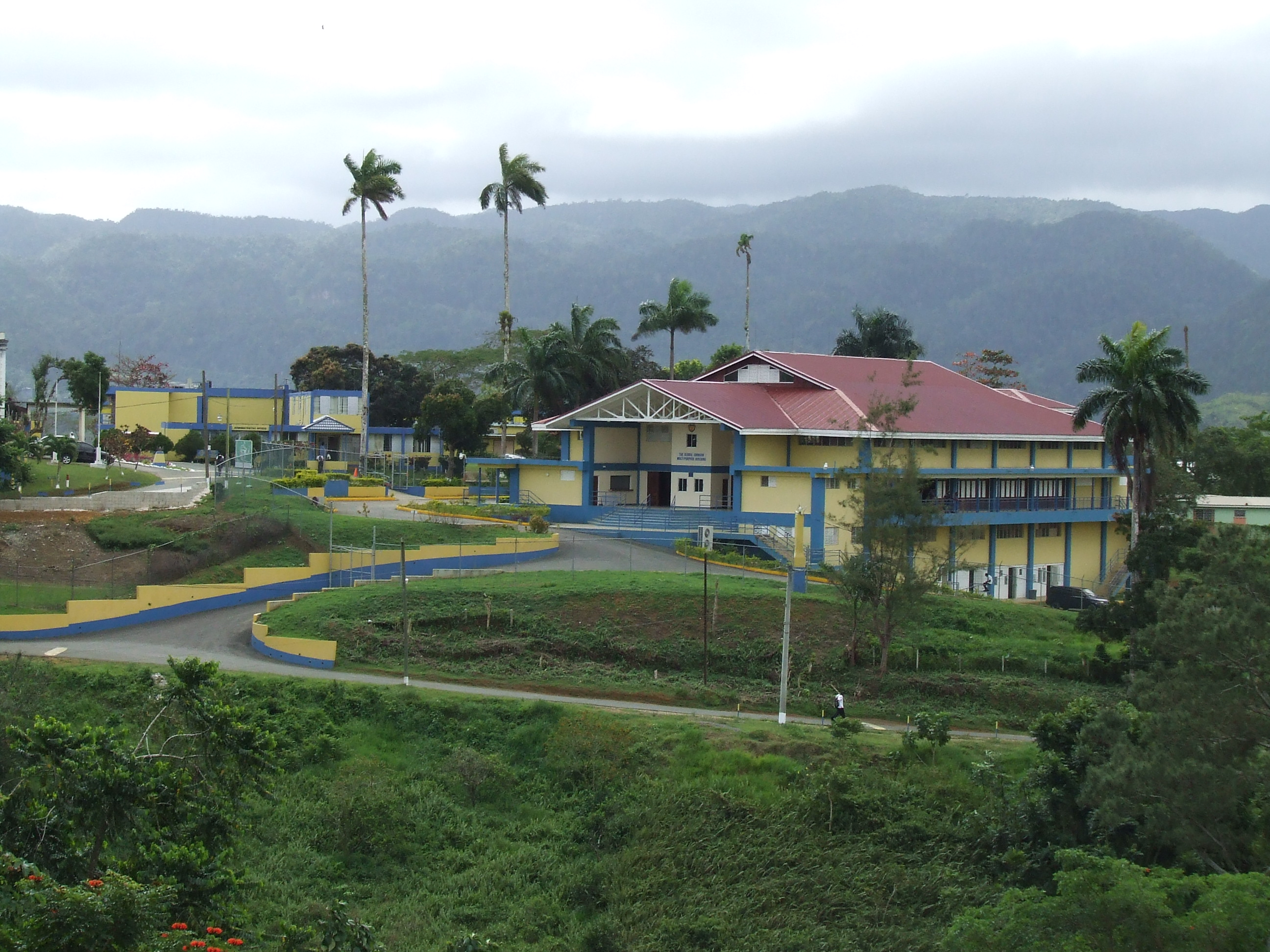
The Gloria-Johnson Multipurpose Building

Moneague College is a multidisciplinary institution located in Moneague, Saint Ann, Jamaica on the main road between Kingston and Ocho Rios. The college is partly situated in the former colonial-era Moneague Hotel.

== History ==
The Moneague Hotel was built in 1891 (135 years ago). During World War II it was used as a soldiers' camp. In 1956, Dr Aubrey Phillips founded Moneague College on the site of the former hotel. The college has expanded today. The original hotel building that was once used for student accommodation and administrative offices was gutted by fire and is awaiting reconstruction.

Moneague College has expanded beyond a teacher training institution to a multi-disciplinary college, offering certificates, associate degrees and degrees in many areas, such as Tourism and Hospitality Management, Business Studies, Management Information Systems, Environmental Studies, Psychology and more. The college also has Pre- University Arts and Science and Continuing Education programmes.
