= Jamaica Social Investment Fund =

The Jamaica Social Investment Fund was established in 1996 as a component of the Government of Jamaica's national poverty alleviation strategy. It was designed to channel money - through loans and grants - into some of the island nation's small-scaled community based projects. It is a temporary organization, originally intended to run until 2000, but presently has agreements that it will continue until 2013.

== See also ==
- Government of Jamaica
