= Royal Jamaica Yacht Club =

Yacht club

- Burgee

- Ensign of the Royal Jamaica Yacht Club
- Short name: RJYC
- Founded: 1884
- Location: Port Royal, Jamaica
- Commodore: David Allen
- Website: www.rjyc.org.jm

The Royal Jamaica Yacht Club was established in 1884, and following by the Prince of Wales, the future King Edward VII, received a Royal Charter from Queen Victoria on the 29th of November 1889. The Commodore of the club was always the Governor of Jamaica until the 1962 independence of Jamaica, following which the Commodore was elected from club members.
