= Dunn's River Falls =

Waterfall in Jamaica

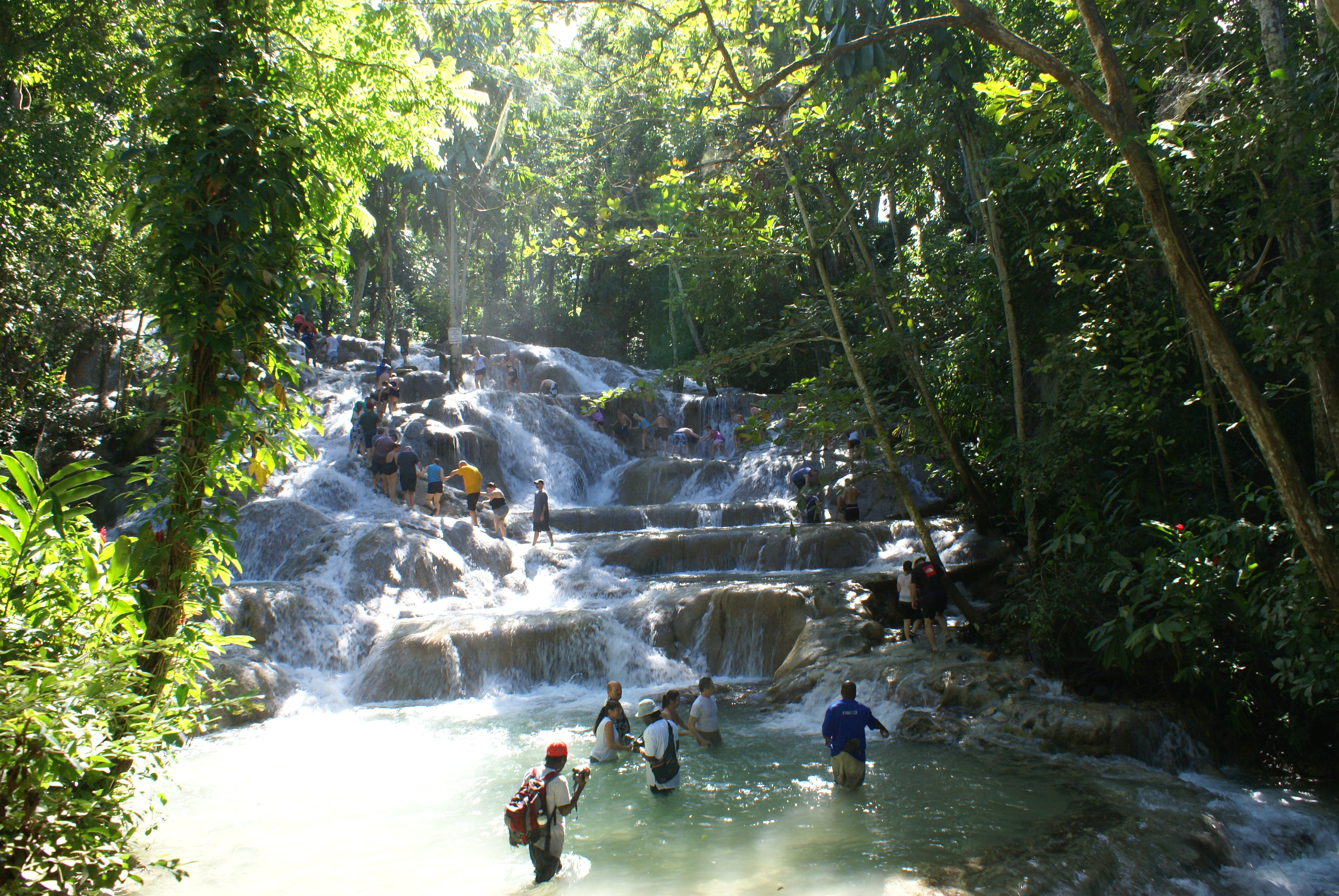
- Tourists climb the falls, holding hands and following the directions of guides for safety. Guides are wearing blue shirts.

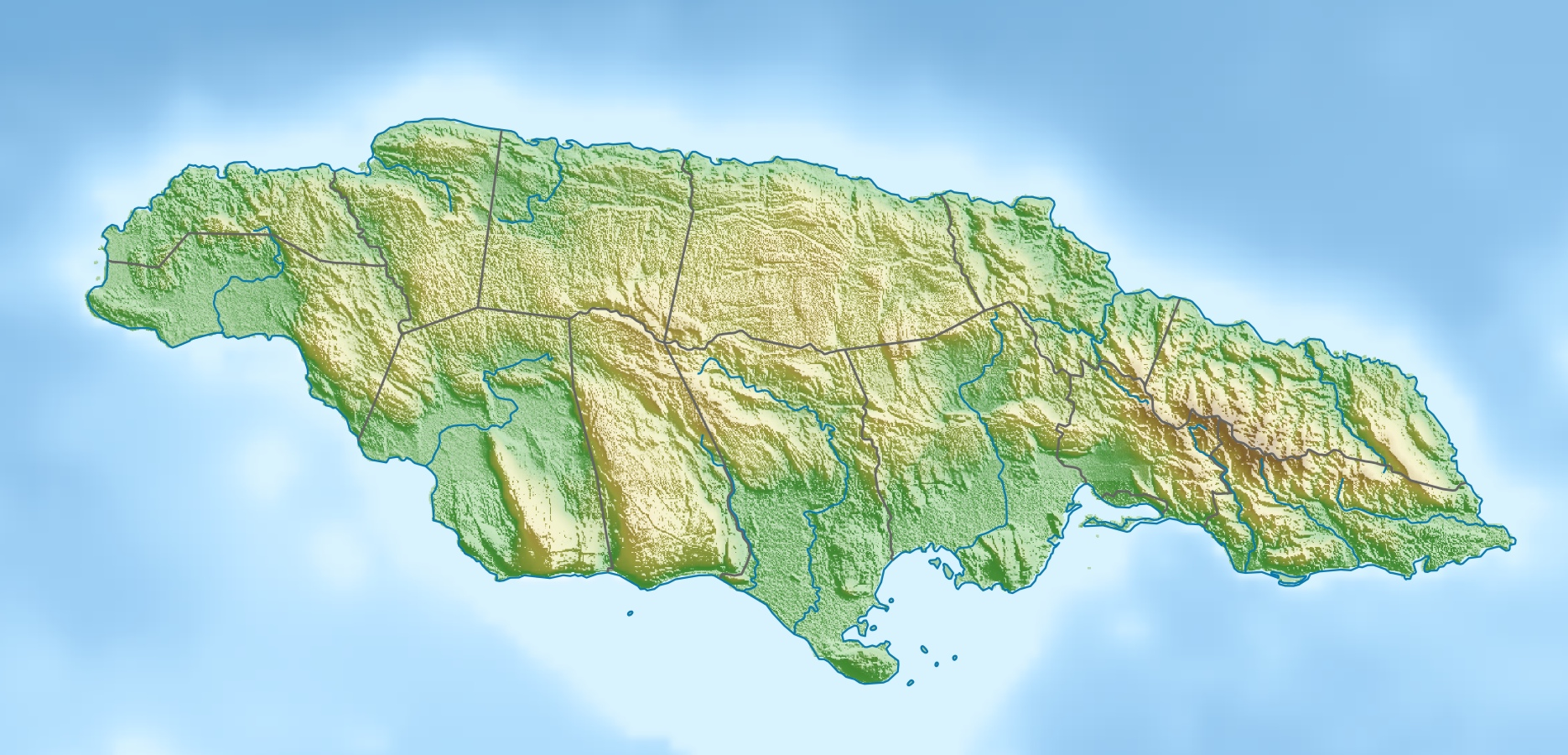
- Location within Jamaica
- Location: Ocho Rios, St Ann, Jamaica
- Coordinates: 18°24′57″N 77°08′17″W
- Type: Multi-step cascade
- Total height: 180 feet (55 m)
- Watercourse: Dunn's River

Dunn's River Falls is a famous waterfall near Ocho Rios, Jamaica.

== Appearance ==
At about 180 feet (55 m) high and 600 feet (180 m) long, the waterfalls are naturally terraced like giant natural stairs. Several small lagoons are interspersed among the vertical sections of the falls.

The falls empty into the Caribbean Sea at the western end of a white-sand beach.

== Tourism ==
Climbing the waterfalls is a popular tourist activity and is often, but not exclusively, performed with the help of tour guides from the park. It takes about 1-1.5 hours to climb with short breaks for photographs and video recordings taken by the guides. There are also stairs alongside the falls for those who do not want to get wet or are unable to manage the rocky, uneven terrain of the actual waterfall.

The falls are bordered by lush, green vegetation that shades the area from the sun and keeps the area, and climbers, cool. The climb can be relatively hard so is often undertaken as a hand-holding human chain led by a guide to make it easier.

In addition to the falls, a park has developed where there is an area for zip-lining, a kids splash pad, and a merchandise area.

In 1988 the falls were used as a filming location during the Hollywood movie Cocktail.

== History ==
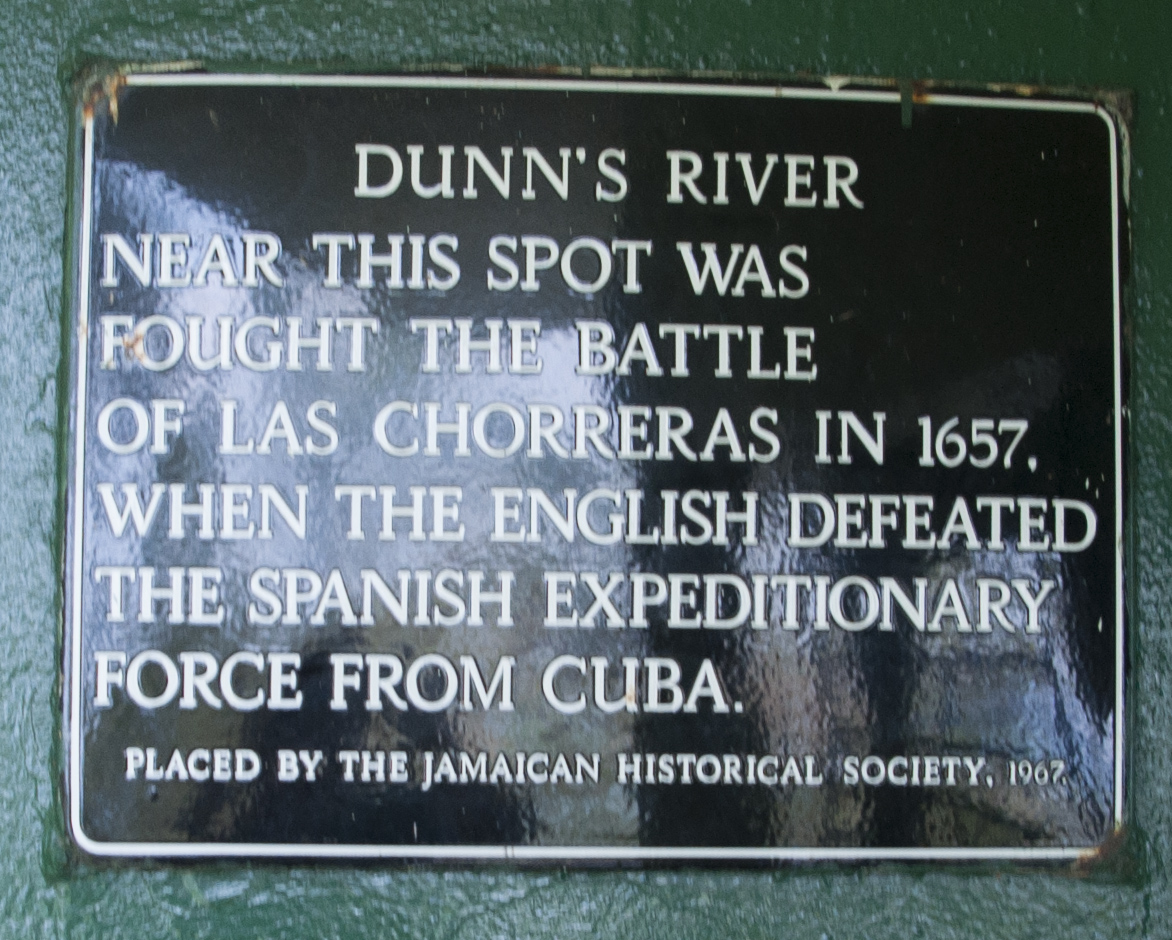
Dunns River Falls plaque

The falls were the location where the Battle of Las Chorreras took place in 1657, when the British defeated a Spanish expeditionary force from Cuba. A plaque placed at the bottom of the falls by the Jamaican Historical Society commemorates the event (see photo).

== Geology ==
Dunn's River, a short stream dropping only 55 metres (180 ft) from its source to the sea, is fed by spring water rich with calcium carbonate and deposits travertine forming a sequence of tufa terraces. Such waterfalls are described by geologists as "a living phenomenon" because they are continuously rebuilt by the sediments in spring water.

Dunn's River Falls is one of the very few travertine waterfalls in the world that empties directly into the sea.

== Awards ==
Dunn's River Falls won the Caribbean's Leading Adventure Tourist Attraction in 2023, 2021, and 2020. The Dunn’s River Falls Zip Line (Ocho Rios) also won Best Caribbean Attraction from the Porthole Cruise Magazine's 2020 Editor-in-Chief Awards.

== See also ==
- List of waterfalls
