= Rio Cobre =

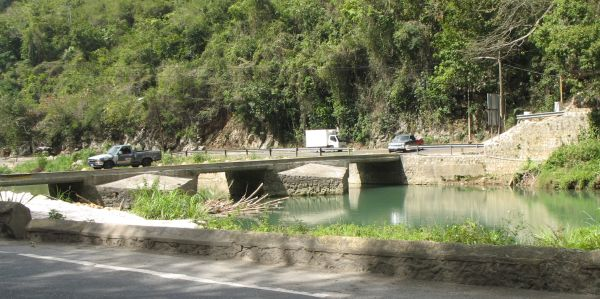
- The A1 road crossing the Rio Cobre via the Flat Bridge.

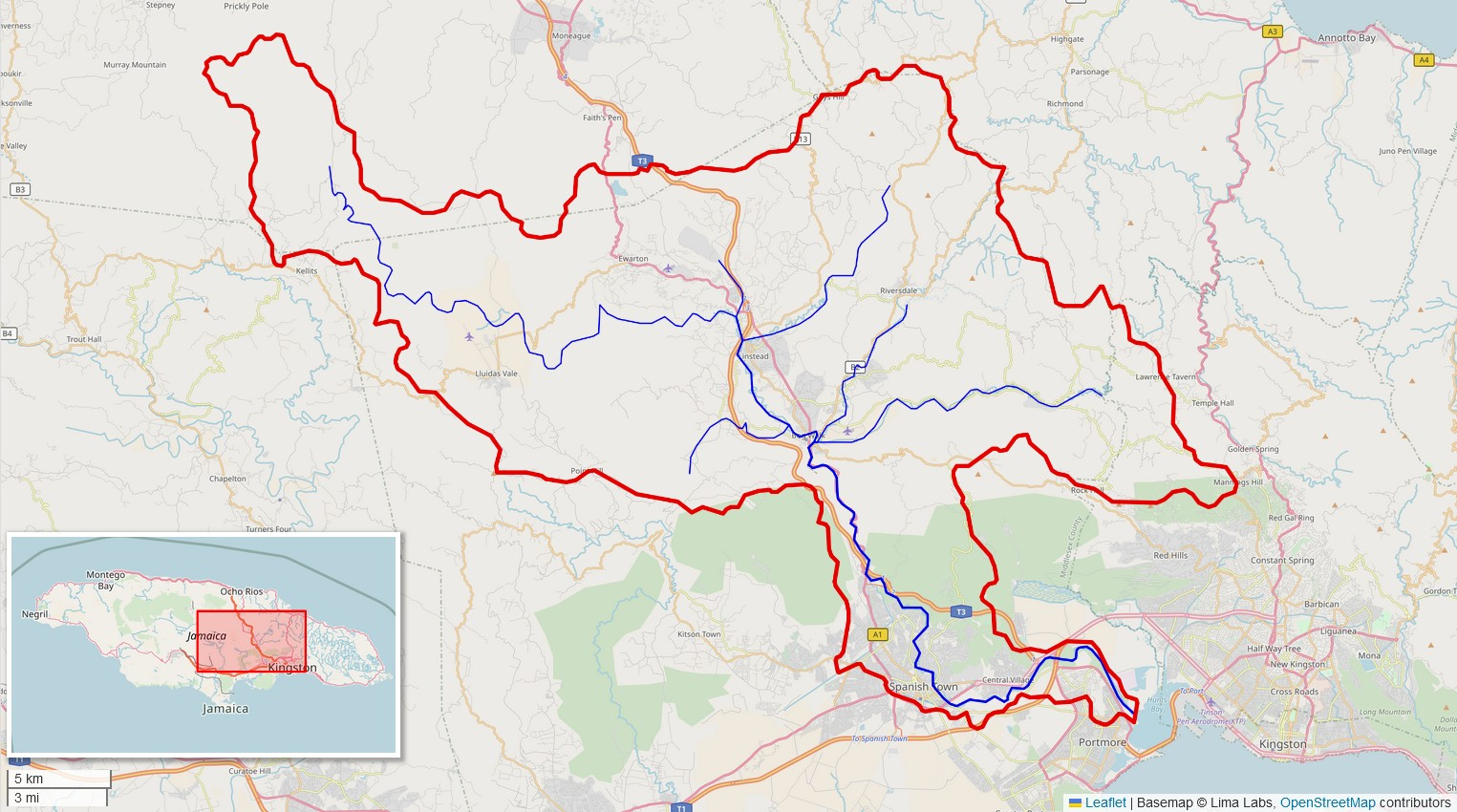
- Rio Cobre watershed (Interactive map)

Location
- Country: Jamaica
- Region: St Catherine

Physical characteristics
- Source: Rose Hall Mountain
  - location: Rose Hall Mountain
  - coordinates: 17.5904°N 76.5226°W
  - elevation: 1,135 ft (346 m)
- Mouth: Caribbean Sea
  - location: Kingston Harbour
  - coordinates: 17.9840396°N 76.8596649°W
  - elevation: 0 m (0 ft)
- Length: 51 km (32 mi)
- Basin size: 145 km^{2} (56.28 mi^{2})
- Width
  - minimum: 5 m (16 ft)
  - average: 50 m (164 ft)
  - maximum: 100 m (328 ft)
- Depth
  - minimum: 1 m (3.3 ft)
  - average: 3 m (9.8 ft)
  - maximum: 12 m (39.4 ft)
- Discharge
  - location: Hunts Bay
  - average: 10 cu ft/s
  - minimum: 0.1 cu ft/s
  - maximum: 11o cu ft/s

Basin features
- Tributaries
  - left: Magno River
  - right: Rio D'Oro, Crawle river, Pedro river,

The Rio Cobre is a river in Jamaica. Its source is in the Rose Hall Mountain in the north-east of Saint Catherine Parish, the headwaters being a writhing of unnamed, seasonally dry tributaries. The highest of these rise just above the 1,135 feet (346 m) contour. From here it flows to meet the Caribbean Sea into the Hunts Bay. It is dammed by the Rio Cobre Dam just above Spanish Town.

The river's most significant feature is perhaps the gorge through which it runs between Bog Walk and northern Spanish Town.

== Bridges ==
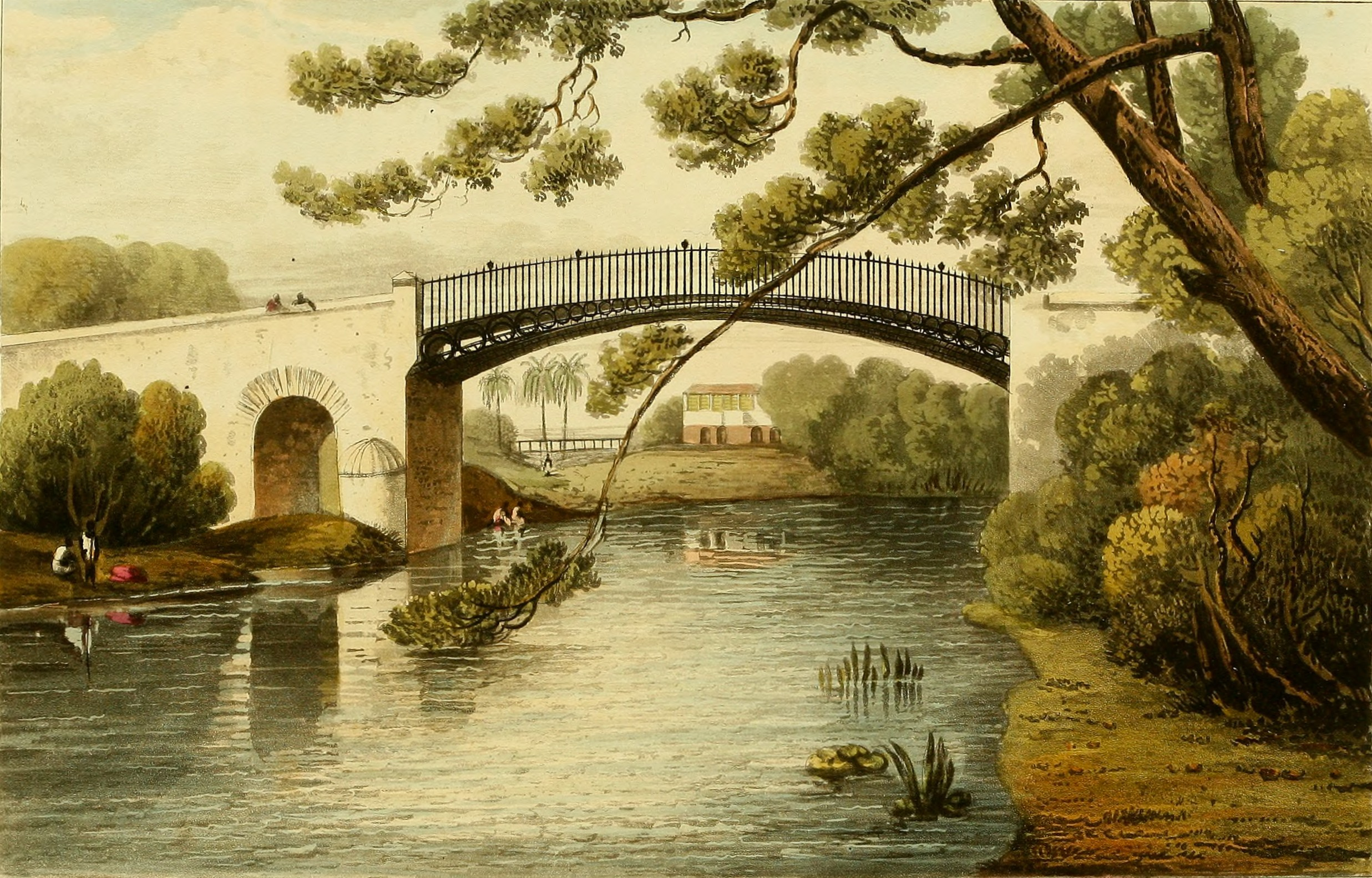
The Iron Bridge as drawn by James Hakewill, circa 1822

There are a number of bridges over the Rio Cobre. The oldest is Flat Bridge, which was first built before 1774.

A second bridge, Iron Bridge was built in 1801. The proposal for this bridge first appeared in 1766 and the topic was discussed various bodies until 1796 the House of Assembly which originally resolved to erect a stone bridge. However technical difficulties led to an iron bridge being erected. This enabled the road to be raised above the surrounding terrain, something particularly important in the context of periodic floods in the rainy season. It used the same technology developed for The Iron Bridge in Shropshire, England, and indeed constituted the first application of this technology outside the United Kingdom. The iron components were pre-fabricated in West Yorkshire with a total weight of 87 long tons (88 t). It took 43 horse-drawn wagons to transport these from the coast to the construction site. The bridge remained in use until 2000, when erosion by storm water put its future survival in jeopardy. However, funds were raised for a restoration project which restored the bridge for use by 2010.

== See also ==
- List of rivers of Jamaica
