= White River (Jamaica) =

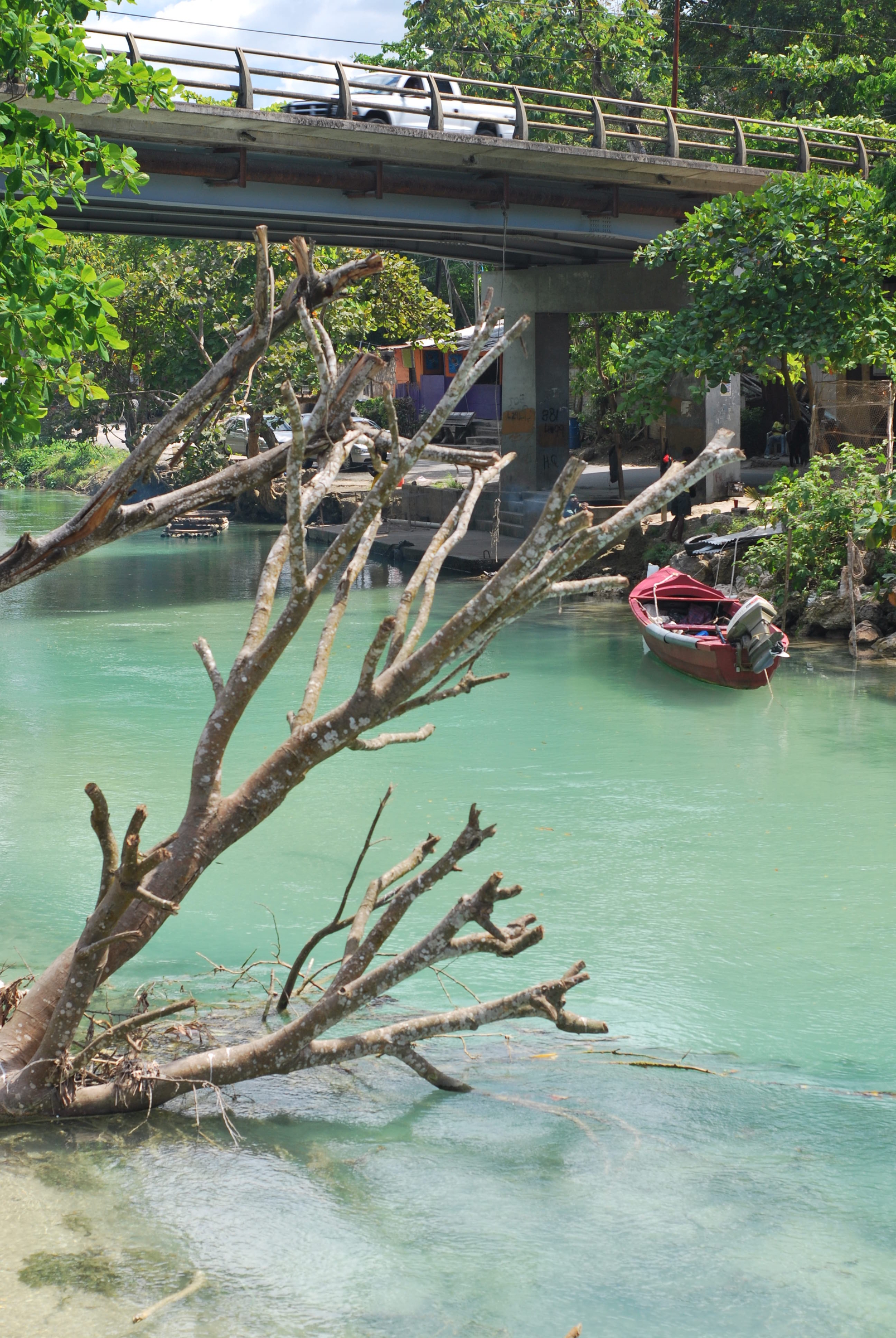
- A bridge over the white river near its mouth, Ocho Rios, St. Ann Parish, Jamaica.

Location
- Country: Jamaica

Physical characteristics
- Mouth
  - coordinates: 18.415674°N 77.071613°W

The White River (Jamaica) is a river of Jamaica.

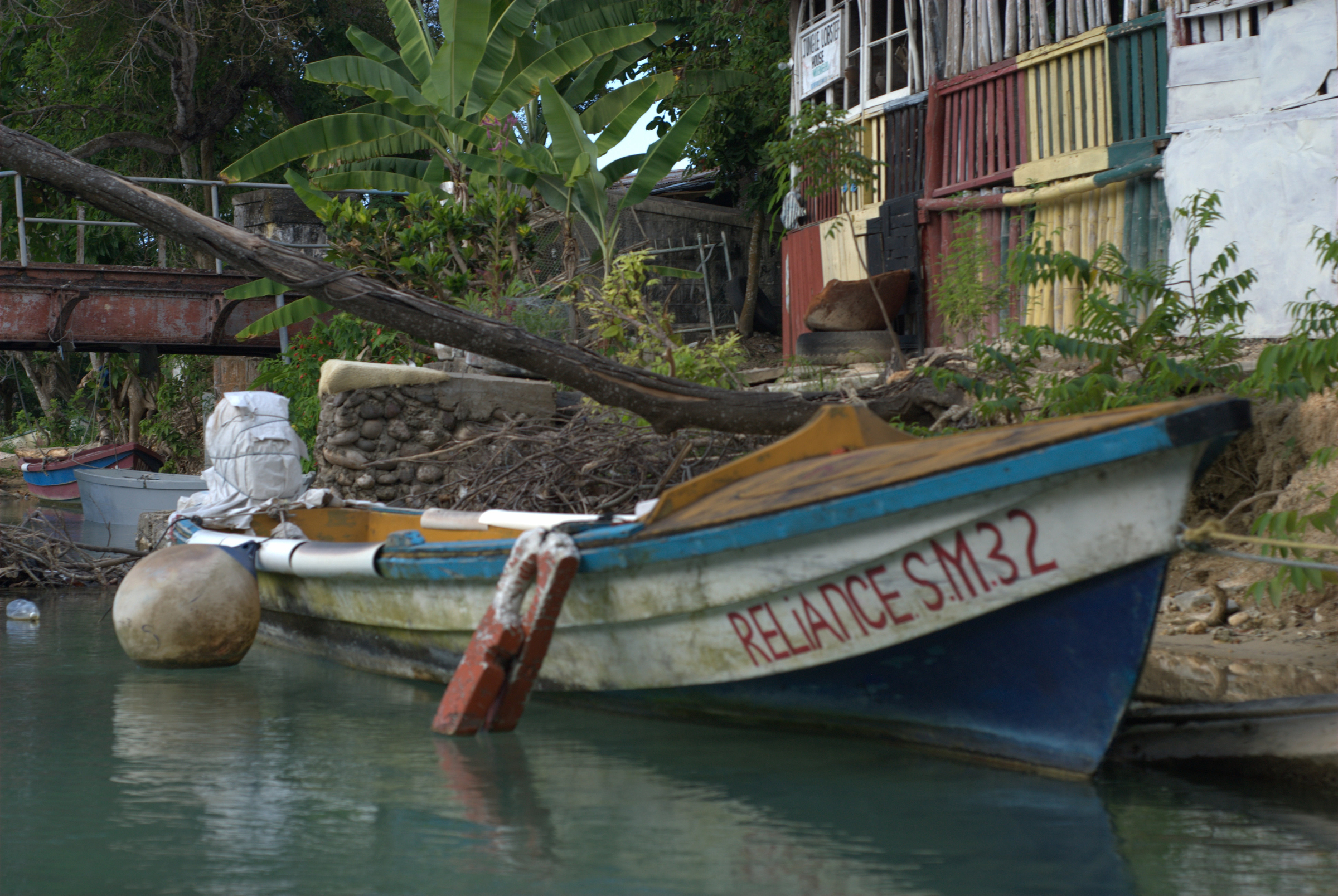
A typical fisherman's house on the bank of the White River in Ocho Rios, St. Ann Parish, Jamaica.

== See also ==
- List of rivers of Jamaica
