= Kingsley Fletcher =

American missionary

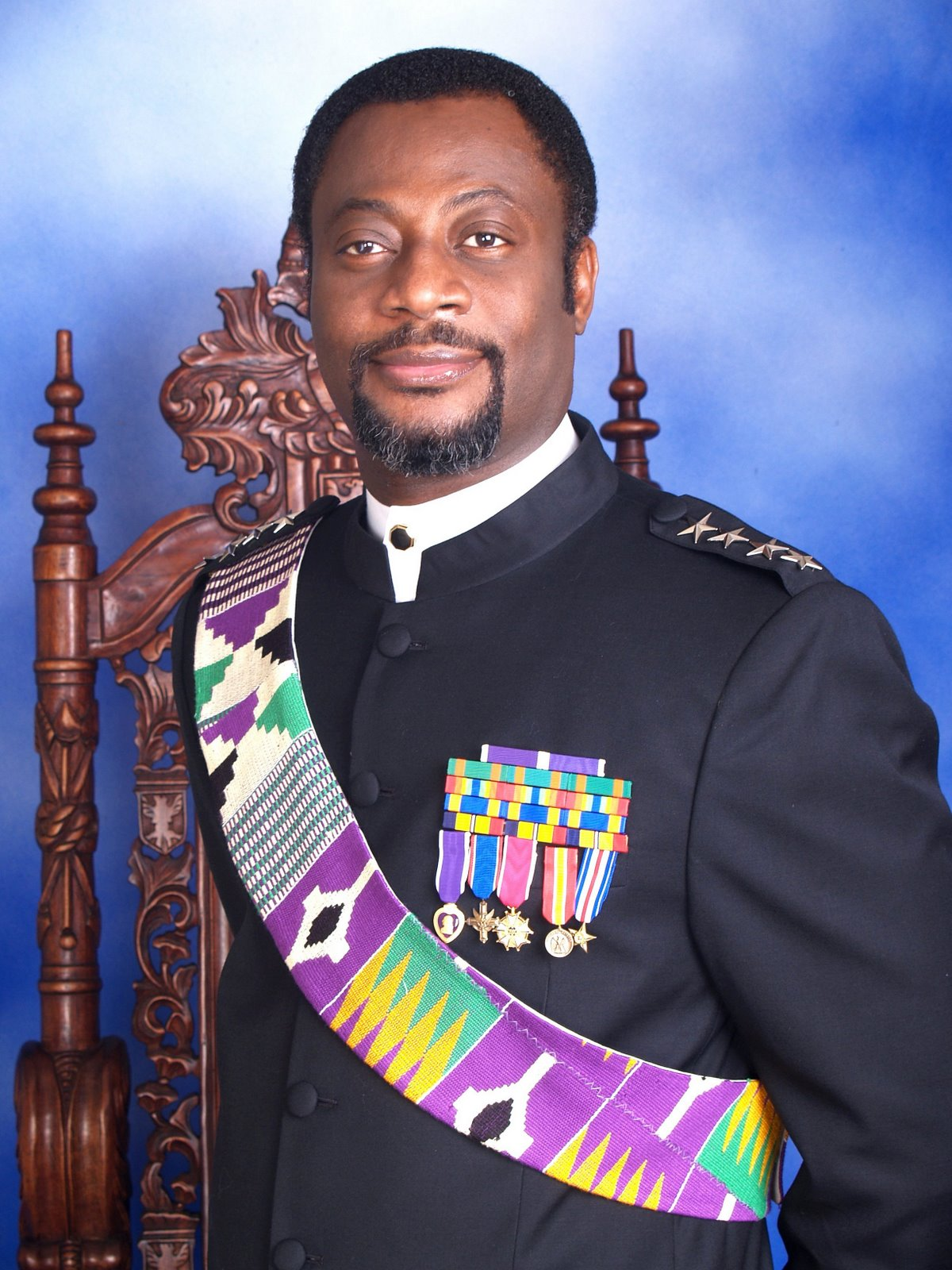
- Reign: 10 August 1999 – Present
- Coronation: 8 August 1999
- Born: April 1, 1956 (age 70); Asamankese, Eastern Region, Ghana
- Spouse: Lady Martha Fletcher
- Father: Nene Martey Agidi I
- Mother: Esther Victoria Lardjea
- Religion: Christian
- Website: kingadamtey.com

Kingsley Fletcher (April 1, 1956) is a North Carolina preacher and author, and the Suapolor ("pathfinder" or "waymaker") of the Se (Shai) Traditional Area in the Dangme West District of Ghana, West Africa, where he carries the title "Drolor" and the royal name Bosso Adamtey I. He is the first chancellor of the University of Professional Studies.

== Professional activities ==
Fletcher is the founding pastor of Life International in Durham, North Carolina, and founder of Kingsley Fletcher Ministries, a "vast conglomerate" of evangelical and commercial activity. Prior to starting his church in Durham, he was a Christian missionary in France, England, and Mexico. In Durham, he also founded the North Carolina Bible College. In Dodowa, Ghana, he helped to establish an education center in collaboration with the North Carolina Central University, which is based in Durham.

He is a speaker and consultant in the areas of international relations, resource mobilization, conflict resolution, social justice, leadership, globalization, and African economic development. Fletcher's speaking engagements include a presentation at the 2009 World Congress of Families in Amsterdam, and he attended the Oxford Round Table.

In late 2009-early 2010 the name of the ministry was changed to Life International, and the title "church" (which had been a staple in the previous names, Miracle Life Church and Life Community Church) was dropped.

He is the Chairman of the FirstBanc Group (A financial services group of companies) and Fletcher Holdings International which has interests in mining, financial services, and media industries.

== Public life ==
Fletcher is the Suapolor of the ethnic Se (Shai) people. He uses the titles "His Royal Majesty Drolor Bosso Adamtey I", "Nene Adamtey I" or "King Adamtey I", in relation to this role, and crowned in 1999 and gazetted.

Fletcher is the chair to a number of corporate boards including FirstBanC Financial Services Ltd and former chair of Ghanaian TV Network TV3. King Adamtey I was the first African leader to be keynote speaker at the World Public Forum (WPF) held in Rhodes, Greece, guest speaker at the Global Forum addressing the power and importance of technology and sustainable development in Africa, as well as participated in the African Presidential Roundtable in Berlin, Germany

In April 2014, Fletcher became Chancellor of The University of Professional Studies, Accra (UPSA), using his platform to encourage universities to include programs relevant in specialized fields like petroleum, agriculture, and allied health- contributing to the unemployment crisis facing the continent. Fletcher holds a doctorate degree in education, Philosophy and Theology. Fletcher believes strongly that education is the key to the success of the African continent

He was knighted in Malta in 2009 by the self-styled order Knights Hospitallers of the Sovereign Order of St John of Jerusalem. As a traditional African ruler, Fletcher became the third highest ranking knight in the order. Nevertheless, there was controversy when a mass planned to commemorate the event was cancelled after the Sovereign Military Order of Malta informed the church rector that the organization that had knighted Fletcher was a "false order", distinct from the real "Knights of Malta".

== Publications ==
Fletcher has written several books, including I Have Seen the Kingdom, When Kings Pray and Fast, A Place Called There, and The Power and Influence of a Woman. His most recent book, Who Says You Can't?, was released in January 2009.
