= National Irrigation Commission =

The National Irrigation Commission was established in 1986 and became operational in May 1987. The commission obtains its authority from the Irrigation Amendment Act (1999). Its chief role is to provide irrigation services to the agricultural sector. Its mission is "to develop potential sources of irrigation water, and to manage these together with existing resources, by the provision of effective and efficient delivery systems up to farm-gate, geared towards the enhancement of Jamaica’s agricultural development". Under the Irrigation Act, the commission furnishes and maintains efficient irrigation systems throughout irrigation areas in accordance with reasonable standards of dependability as required in irrigation operations. The commission is also responsible for keeping the Black River navigable and other selected watercourses clear in order to minimise flooding in that area. It takes necessary precautions to avoid flooding at all times.

== Water supply standards ==
The National Irrigation Commission is mandated to maintain the water courses under its control at a standard to ensure that its clients obtain their supplies at an acceptable quality. The following are the main requirements for the commission to adequately maintain its irrigation systems:

Keep watercourses clean and clear or remove from such water courses inclusive of the banks, any vegetation including trees, logs, refuse, soil or any obstacle which may obstruct or impede the natural flow of water and possibly cause flooding of adjacent areas. Refuse removed from the canals by the commission must be placed on land adjacent to the watercourse but not beyond a distance of one chain measured from the top of the banks thereof. Keep clean and free from obstruction such drains as may be deemed necessary for the proper drainage of such land. Trim trees or shrubbery which may overhang, endanger or interfere with any irrigation works. From time to time, the commission may construct, lay and maintain road or open spaces within the irrigation districts.

== Service standards observed ==
The following standards are observed:

Process duly completed applications within four weeks of receipt at the district office. Offer simultaneous readings (i.e. joint reading) of measuring devices. Customers who do not participate must recognize that the Commission’s readings will prevail. Make customers’ bills available within eight days after billing period. Reconnect customers for the non-payment of bills within 72 hours of payment of both the bill and the re-connection fee. Address requests for adjustments to water supply (i.e.turn on/off of supplies) by contracted customers within 24 hours. Maintain standards of operational efficiency which will help to keep irrigation rate charges to a minimum.

== Irrigable areas ==
Out of the approximately 90,000 that are considered irrigable in Jamaica, almost 36,000 have some sort of irrigation infrastructure installed, but only some 25,000 ha are currently irrigated. Almost 55% of the irrigated area is in public irrigation systems, administered by the National Irrigation Commission. Irrigation is mainly supplementary and most of the Island’s agricultural lands are cultivated under rain fed conditions. However, some specific areas with good soils and topographical conditions for intensive agriculture are highly dependent upon irrigation. According to the Land and Water Atlas of Jamaica produced by the National Irrigation Development Master Plan, rainfall regimes make irrigation a necessity for intensive agriculture in the South/Central Region of the Island (mainly covering some parts of the Parishes of St Elizabeth, Manchester, Clarendon, St. Catherine, St. Andrew and an isolated part of St. Thomas). Indeed, it is there, where most of the current irrigation infrastructure of the Island is located and where most of the proposed projects to be developed by the Master Plan were identified.

== Affiliates ==
- Meteorological Service of Jamaica
- National Water Commission
- Office of Disaster Preparedness and Emergency Management
- Jamaica Information Service
- Office of Utilities Regulation
- National Environment & Planning Agency
- Ministry of Water, Land, Environment & Climate Change
- Agro Investment Corporation
- Rural Agricultural Development Authority
- Jamaica Social Investment Fund
- Water Resource Authority

== See also ==
- Environmental impact of irrigation
