= Palisadoes =

Protective tombolo of sand in Jamaica

Coordinates: 17.941667°N 76.741667°W

Designations

Ramsar Wetland
- Official name: Palisadoes - Port Royal
- Designated: 22 April 2005
- Reference no.: 1454

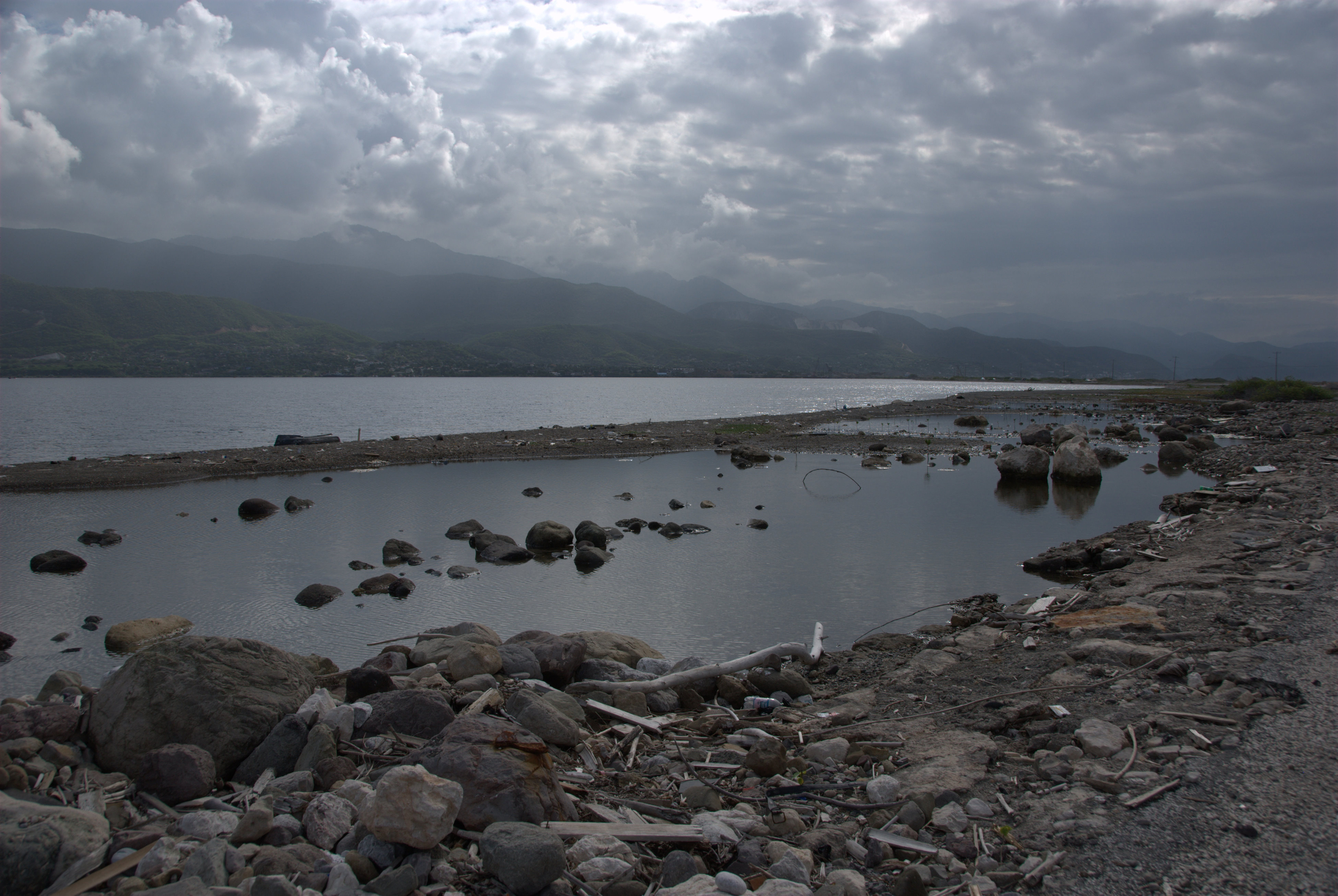
A view of Kingston Harbour from Palisadoes

Palisadoes (word apparently of Portuguese origin) is the thin tombolo of sand that serves as a natural protection for Kingston Harbour, Jamaica. Norman Manley International Airport and the historic town of Port Royal are both on Palisadoes.

The privateer Henry Morgan was buried in Palisadoes cemetery, which sank beneath the sea after the 1692 earthquake.

Concerns have been raised that littering by sightseers may contribute to infestations of cockroaches. In 2023, several organisations undertook clean-up initiatives in the area to address pollution from plastics as well as potential infestations of cockroaches and rodents.

== See also ==
- Kingston Harbour
