= Kingston Harbour =

- Harbour
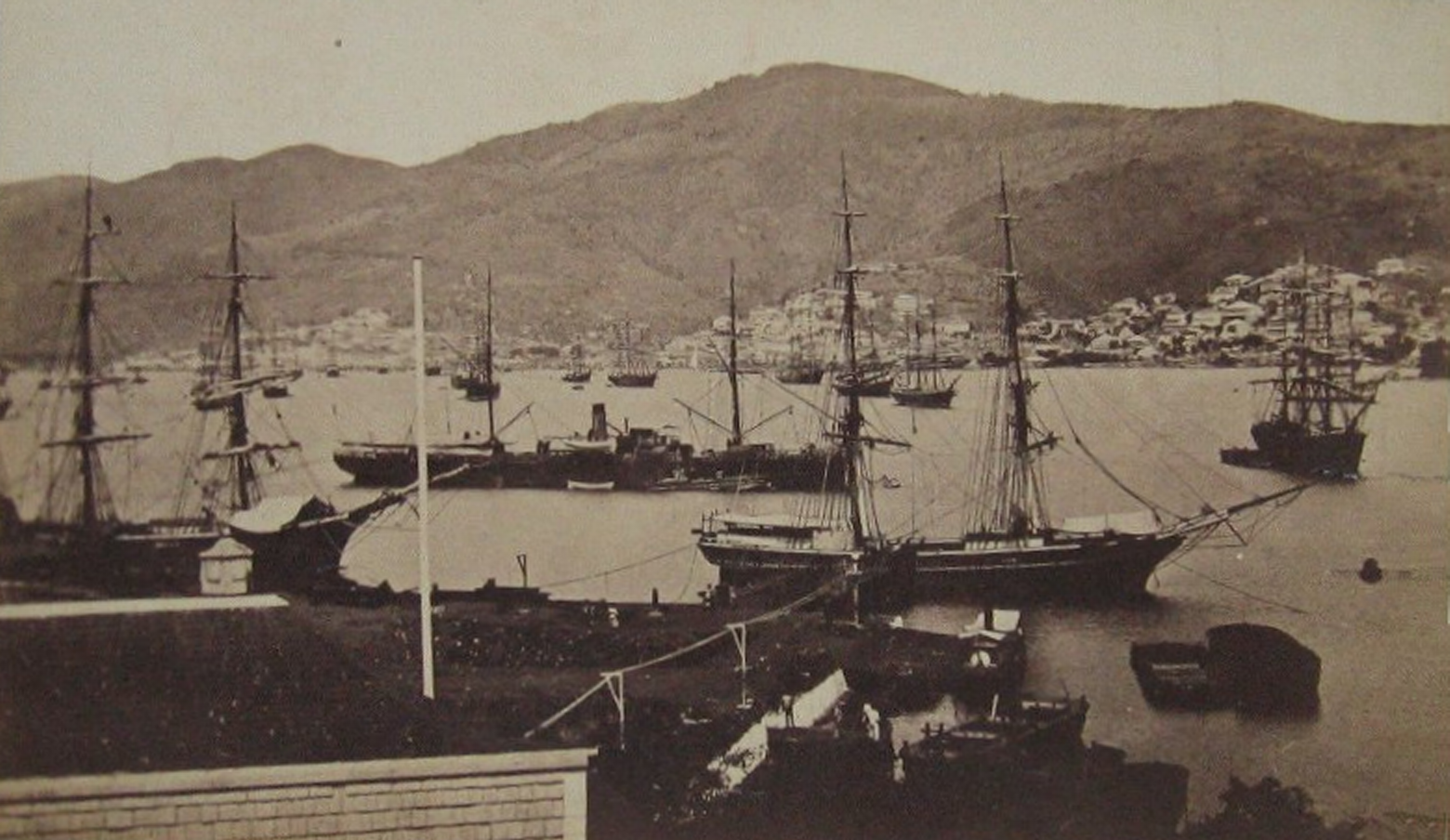
- Kingston Harbour c. 1870

- Location within Jamaica
- Coordinates: 17.95°N 76.80°W
- Country: Jamaica
- Parish: Kingston

Area
  - Water: 52 km^{2} (20 sq mi)
- Time zone: UTC-5 (EST)

Kingston Harbour in Jamaica is the seventh-largest natural harbour in the world. It is an almost landlocked area of water approximately 16 kilometres (9.9 mi) long by 3.2 kilometres (2.0 mi) wide. Most of it is deep enough to accommodate large ships, even close to shore. It is bordered to the north by the city of Kingston, the capital of Jamaica; to the west by Hunts Bay and the municipality of Portmore; and to the south and east by the Palisadoes strip, which protects it.

The harbour is home to the Kingston Container Terminal, Jamaica's largest port. Other docks on Kingston Harbour are at the Petroleum Corporation of Jamaica in downtown Kingston and at the Jamaica Flour Mills and the Caribbean Cement Company at Rockfort. Fresh water, along with industrial and domestic waste, is discharged into Hunts Bay from rivers and drainage gullies, including Rio Cobre and Sandy Gully.

Norman Manley International Airport, Jamaica's second busiest international airport, is also located in the outer harbor, on the Palisadoes strip.

There is a fishing village at Rockfort and fishing docks at Harbour View and at Port Royal.

== History ==
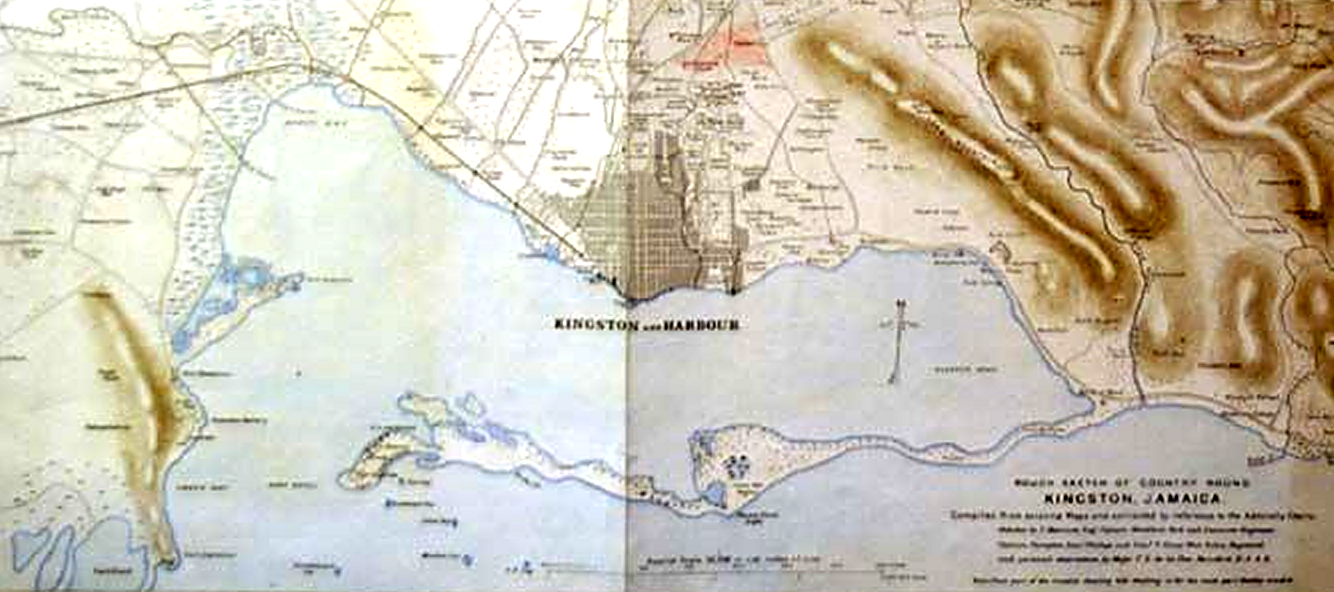
An extract from an 1891 map of Kingston and environs.

As a large, natural, well-protected harbour, it was doubtless used by indigenous people, and has been used by Europeans since the very beginning of their exploration and settlement of the island. Initially the main settlement was at Port Royal but following its destruction in the 1692 earthquake, the English founded Kingston and began development of its waterfront.

Historically, the harbour was safe from attack with its narrow entrance being protected by two forts, one the tip of the Palisadoes at Port Royal and the other on a small sand spit opposite.

Throughout the 18th and early 19th centuries it handled a large local trade and was the chief entrepot for British exports to the Spanish colonies. For the remainder of the 19th century its development as a port was retarded by a decline in the Jamaican economy. Throughout this period there was a gradual increase in the number of finger piers and wharves along its long sheltered waterfront.

In November 1720, the body of John Rackham was gibbeted at the entrance of the harbour alongside other members of his crew as a warning to other pirates.

== Pollution ==
In modern times Kingston Harbour has suffered a number of pollution incidents. In one such during 2009, 300 tons of sulphuric acid are said to have been accidentally discharged from one of the wharves.

== Gallery ==
Images of Kingston Harbour in chronological order
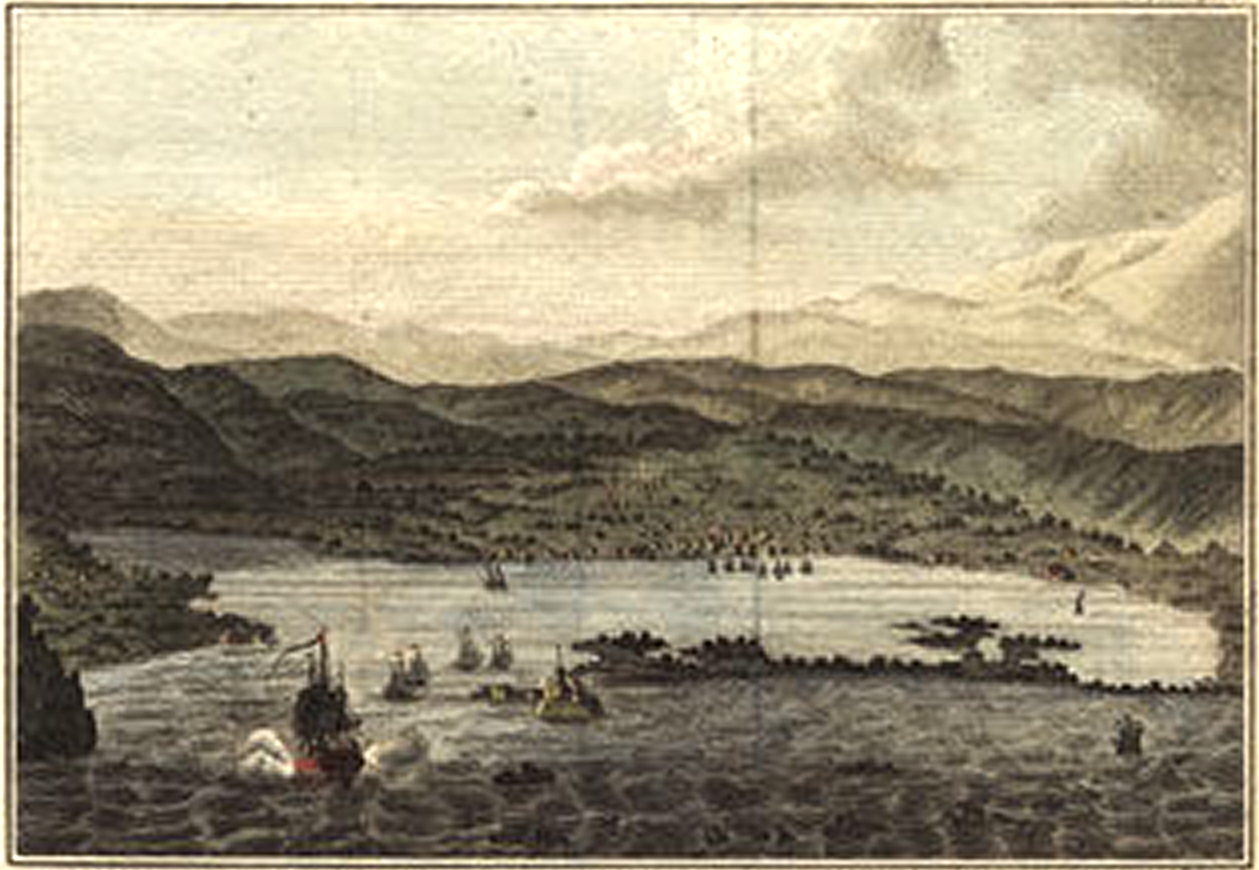
Kingston Harbour ca. 1782

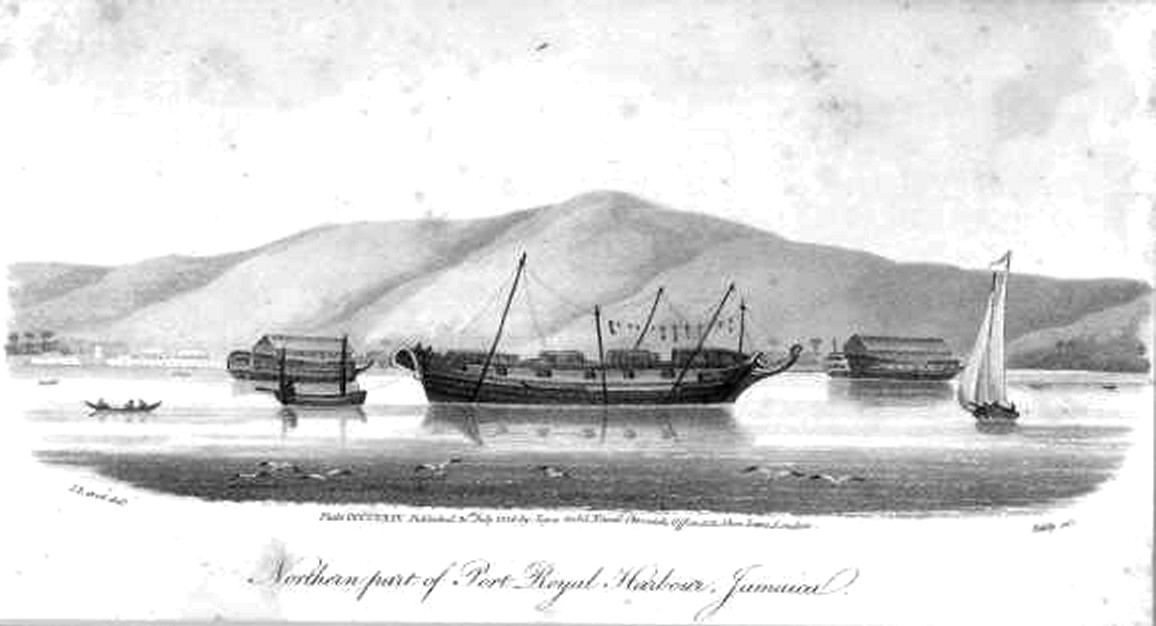
Kingston Harbour ca. 1806

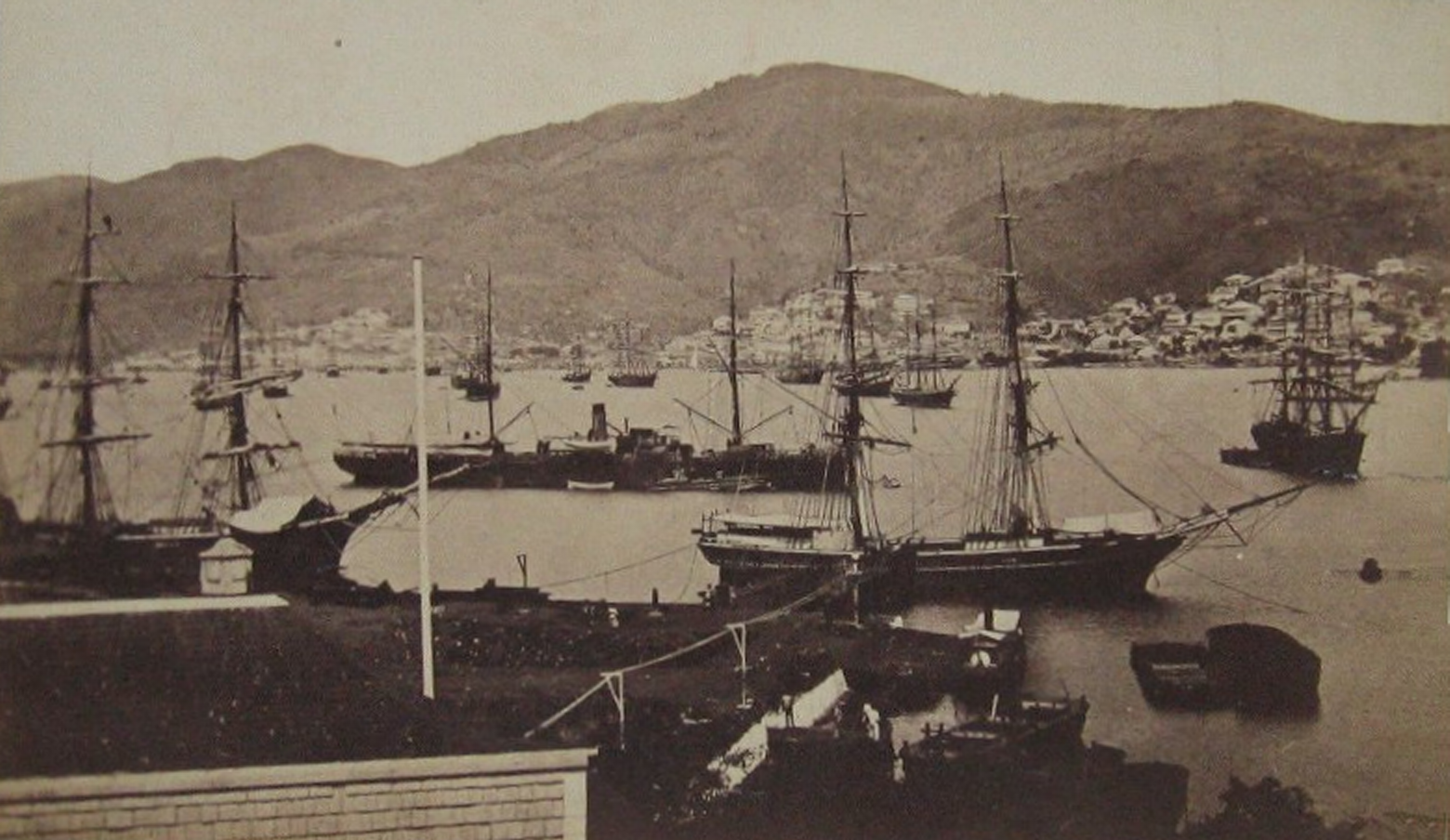
Kingston Harbour c1870

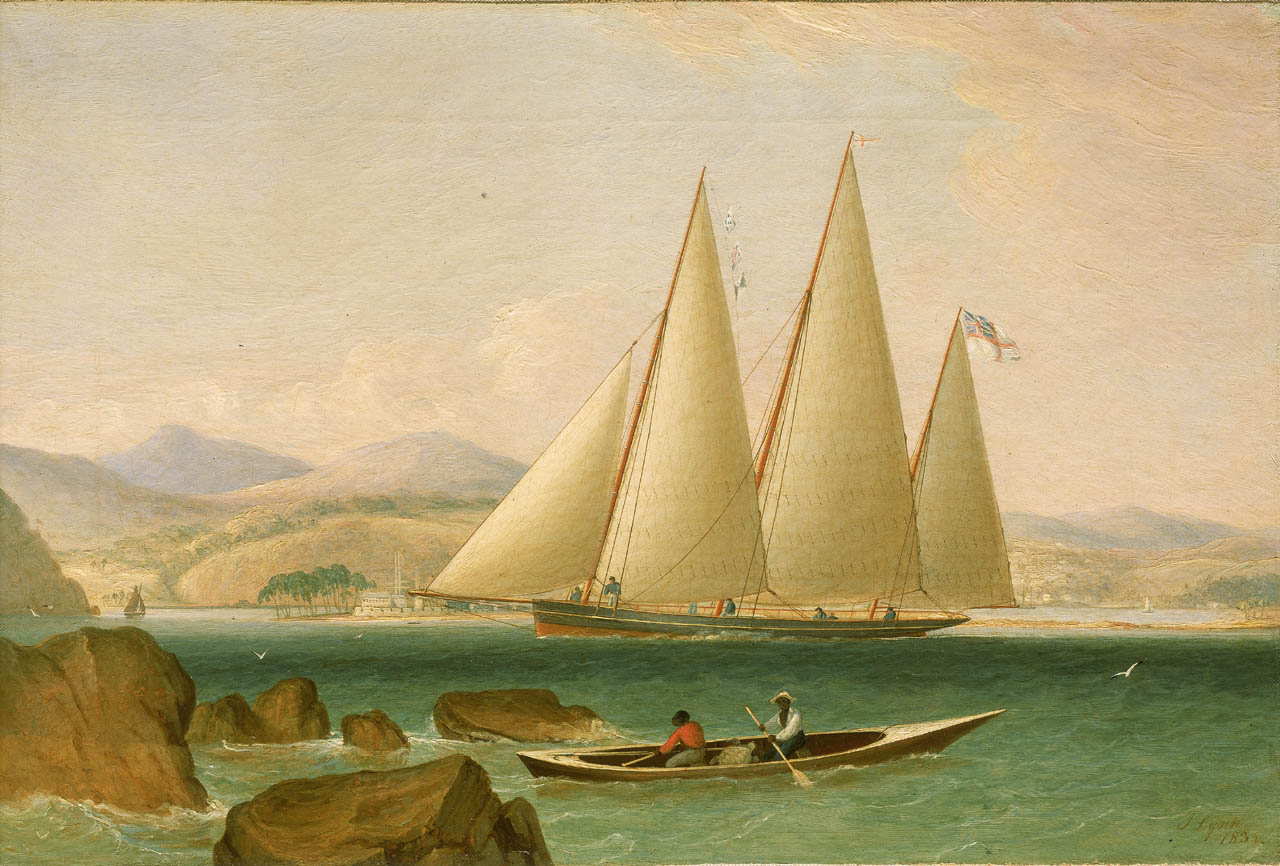
A yacht in the harbour entrance ca. 1834

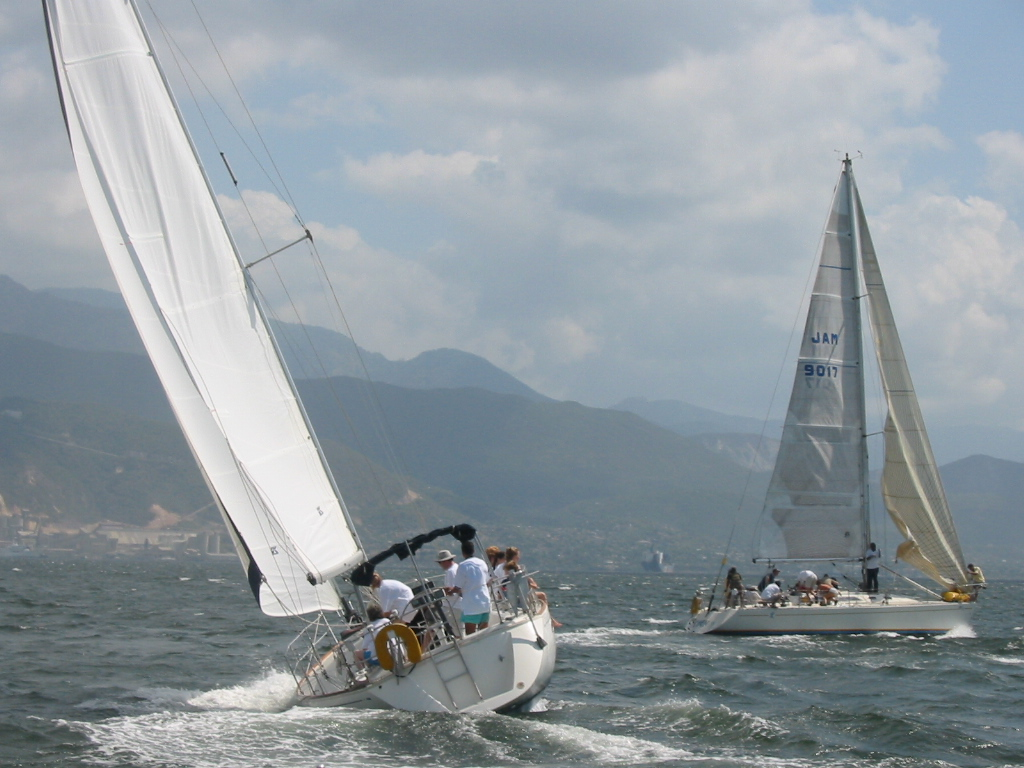
Yachts racing in the harbour in 2005

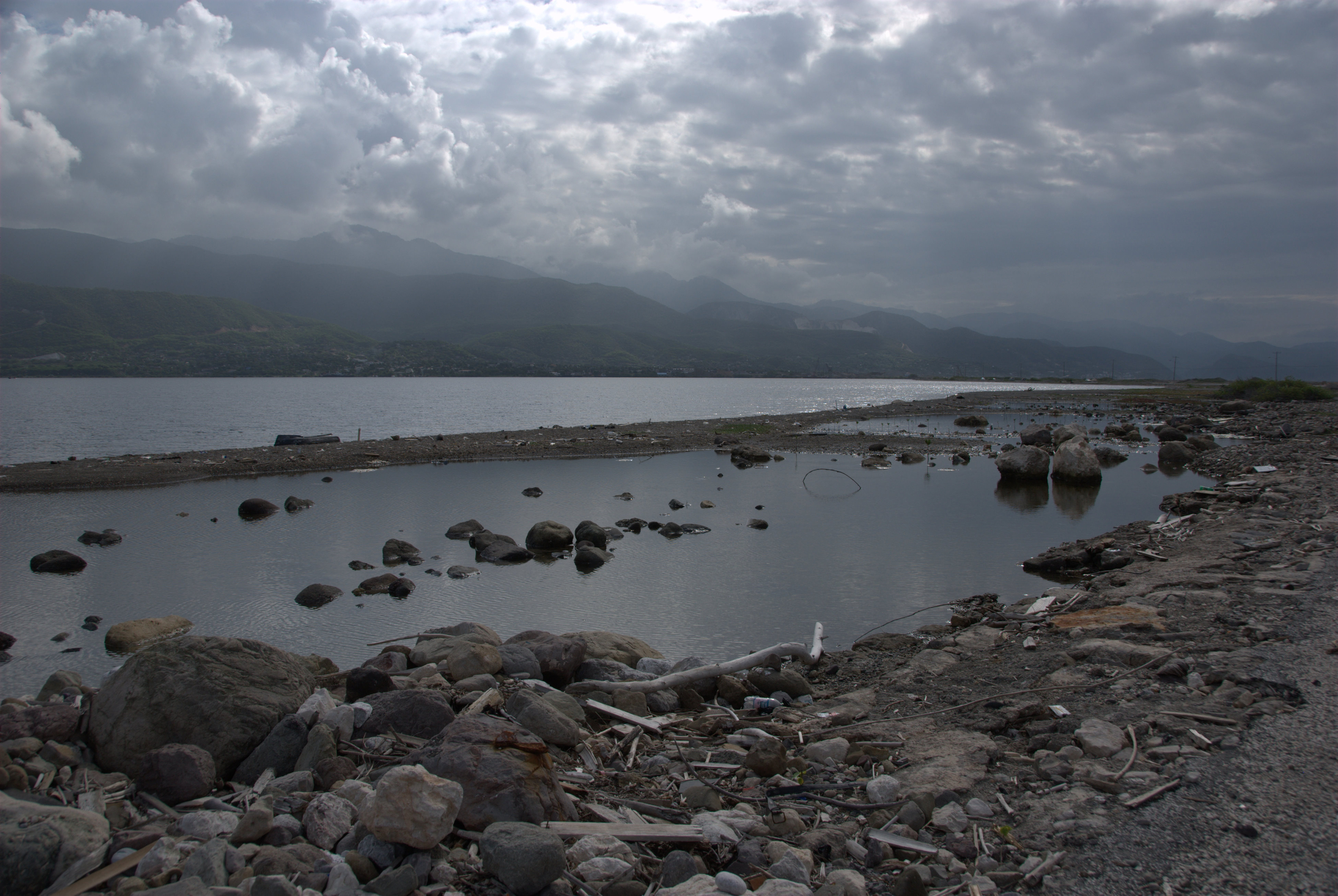
A view of Kingston Harbour View from Palisadoes

== See also ==
- Cagway Bay
- History of Jamaica
- Transport in Jamaica
