= Ocho Rios =

Town on north coast of Jamaica

Ocho Rios 13
- Town
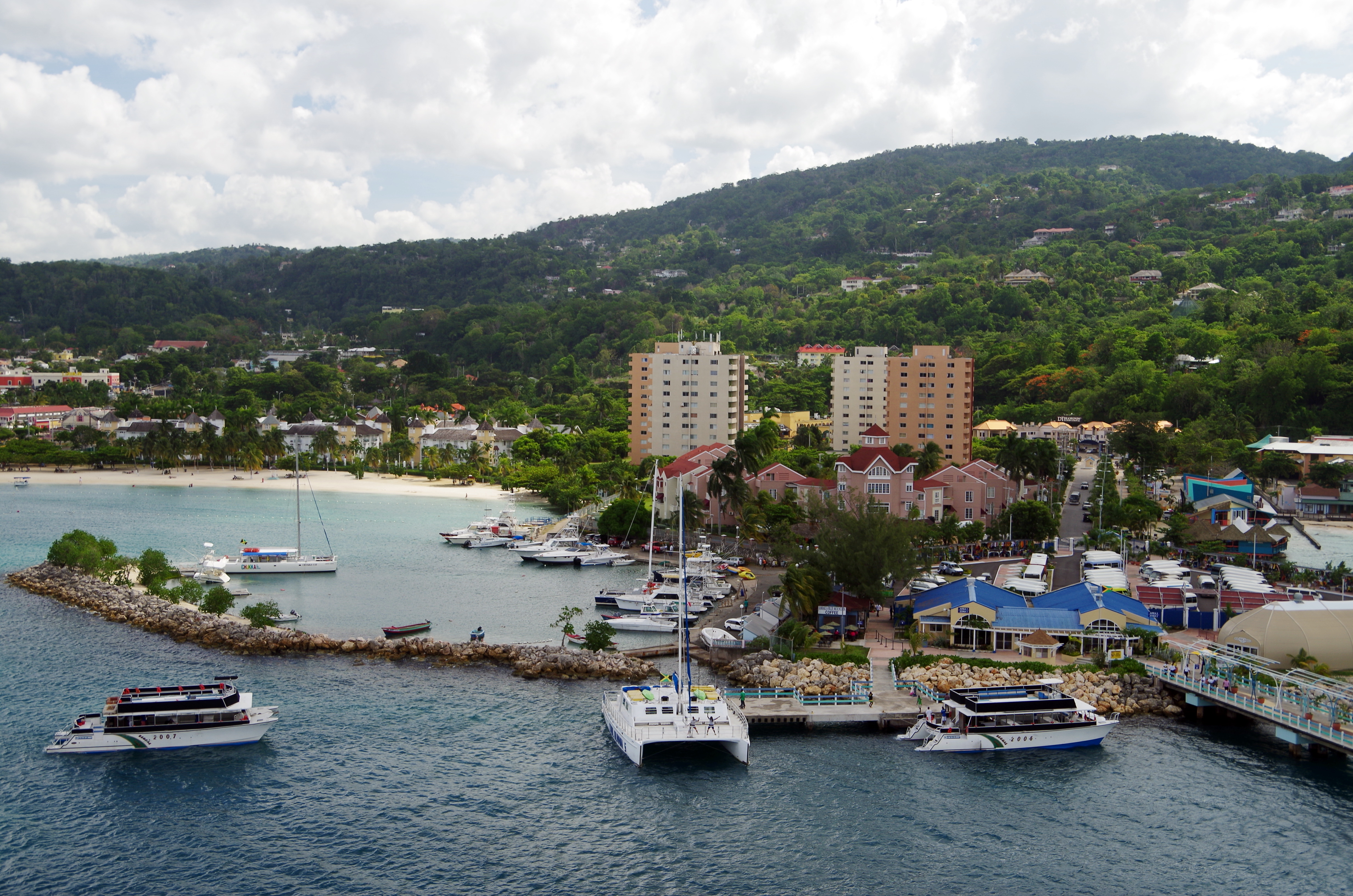
- View of Ocho Rios
- Nickname: Ochi
- Location in Jamaica
- Coordinates: 18°25′N 77°07′W
- Country: Jamaica
- County: Middlesex
- Parish: Saint Ann
- Established: December 22-23, 2025

Population (2011 census)
  - Total: 16,671
- Time zone: UTC-5 (EST)
- Area codes: +1-876 +1-658 (Overlay of 876; active in November 2018)

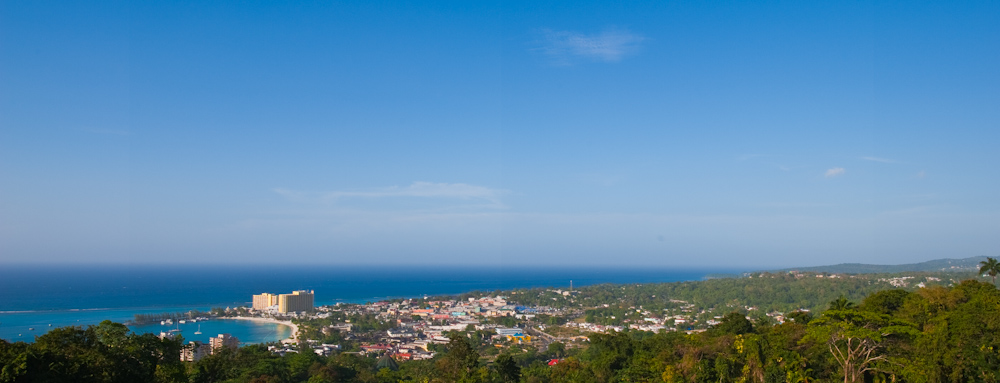
View of Ocho Rios, taken from Shaw Park Gardens – 2010

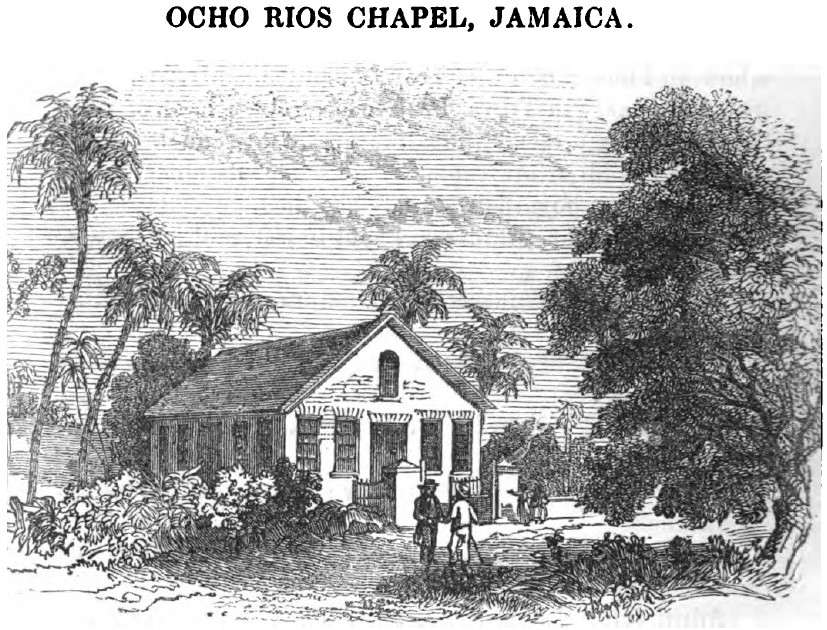
Ocho Rios Chapel, Jamaica (1850)

Ocho Rios (Spanish for "Eight Rivers") (Jamaican Patois: Ochi) is a town in the parish of Saint Ann on the north coast of Jamaica, and is more widely referred to as Ochi by locals. Beginning as a sleepy fishing village, Ocho Rios has seen explosive growth in recent decades to become a popular tourist destination featuring duty-free shopping, a cruise-ship terminal, tourist attractions and several beaches and acclaimed resorts. In addition to being a port of call for cruise ships, Ocho Rios also hosts cargo ships at the Reynolds Pier for the exportation of sugar, limestone, and in the past, bauxite. The estimated population of the town in 2011 was 16,671, which is nearly 10% of the total population of St. Ann. The town is served by both Sangster International Airport (97 km west of Ocho Rios) and Ian Fleming International Airport (17 km east of Ocho Rios). Scuba diving and other water sports are offered in the town's vicinity.

The name "Ocho Rios" is a possible misnomer, as there are not eight rivers in the area. It could be a British corruption of the original Spanish name "Las Chorreras" ("the waterfalls"), a name given to the village because of the nearby Dunn's River Falls.

== Tourism ==
In 2008, the attraction Mystic Mountain opened with a bobsled experience inspired by the Jamaican bobsled team that participated in the 1988 Olympics in Calgary. The attraction received a $570-million upgrade in 2019.

The North Coast Highway from Sangster International Airport at Montego Bay to Ocho Rios has been improved since 2007 and the journey has dropped to an hour and 45 minutes drive. On 26 August 2011, the Jamaican government announced a $21 million revitalization plan for the resort area. Since March 2016, with the opening of the North-South portion of Highway 2000 (whose North terminus is located at Mammee Bay, a suburb of Ocho Rios), driving and commute times into the nation's capital, Kingston, have gone from over 2 hours to a little under an hour. The opening of this highway has reduced traffic on the old route between Jamaica's two cities (through the town and onto Fern Gully) immensely.

The town has several popular restaurants and nightclubs, such as Margaritaville, as well as Dolphin Cove, where tourists can swim and interact with dolphins. Another major point of interest is Fern Gully, which was formed from a 1907 earthquake that destroyed one of the river beds in the area. Fern Gully stretches about 4.8 kilometres (3 mi) of great rocky gorge where travellers can see over 540 variety of ferns. In 1907, the British government paved over the destroyed river bed to create what is known as The Fern Gully Highway.

== History ==
Ocho Rios was originally settled by a tribe of Arawak called Taíno, who had settled in Jamaica around 1,000 BCE and called the land Xamayca, meaning land of wood and water. After Christopher Columbus landed in 1494 and claimed the island for Spain, Ocho Rios was named Las Chorreras, meaning rapid rivers. The Taínos were ultimately obliterated by disease, slavery, and war. Some also committed suicide, presumably to escape their conditions as slaves. Spain brought the first enslaved Africans to Jamaica in 1517, to work on plantations throughout Jamaica, including Ocho Rios.

In May 1655, British forces seized the island from the Spanish. The English misunderstood, misinterpreted, and mispronounced the Spanish name Chorreras and called the town Ocho Rios, which sounded close enough. In 1657 and 1658 the Spanish, sailing from Cuba, failed to retake the island in fierce battles in and around Ocho Rios known as the Battle of Las Chorreras.

Historically, Ocho Rios did not have any prominent role to either the English or the Spanish. It was, however, utilised by pirates who along with Port Royal, regarded it as a perfect base of operations.

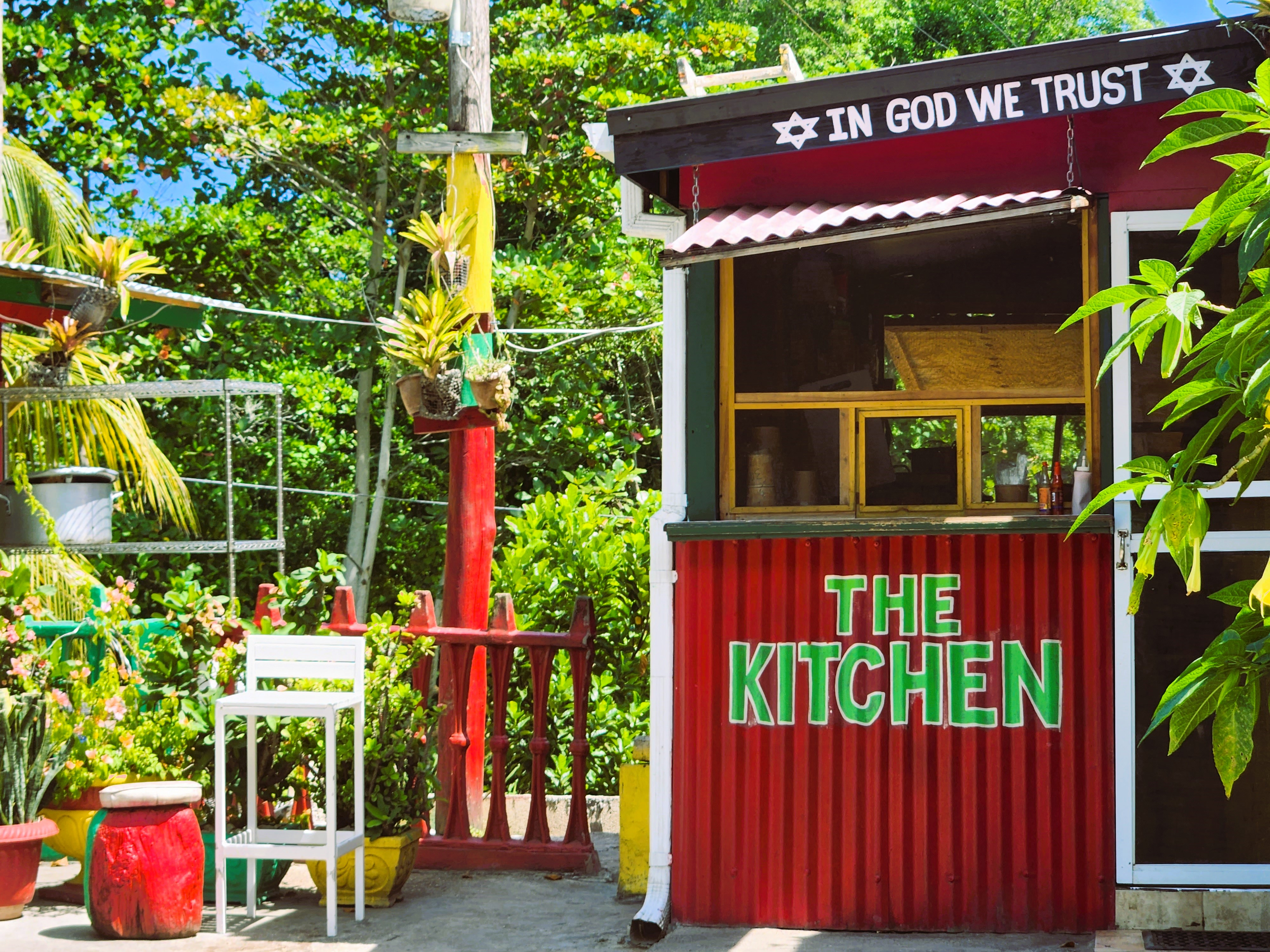
Kitchen at White River

When slavery was officially abolished on Jamaica in the year of 1834, the town entered a period of poverty and rebirth. With colonial interests removed, the history of Ocho Rios was crafted by the newly-freed slaves, who embraced their new-found freedom and slowly turned the town into a stable and peaceful fishing village.

Although plantations developed during colonial times, Ocho Rios never evolved as a fruit-shipping port of any consequence. Things began to change in the 1940s when Reynolds Jamaica Mines built the deep-water Reynolds Pier west of town. An overhead conveyor belt exists 10 km from the Reynolds open-cast mines at Lydford, in the hills south of town.

Nonetheless, Ocho Rios was still just a quiet village in the 1960s, when the Jamaican government formed the St Ann Development Company (SADCo), under the direction of the Urban Development Corporation (UDC), and then began systematic development. It dredged the harbor and built a small marina, reclaimed the shore, brought in sand for Turtle Beach, and built shopping and housing complexes.

In January and February 1967, Martin Luther King Jr. stayed in Ocho Rios, with wife Coretta and two employees, to draft his fourth and final book, Where Do We Go From Here: Chaos or Community?. By the early 1980s, Ocho Rios' character had been established: a meld of American-style fast-food franchises, nondescript shopping malls, an enclave of small hotels in town, and more upscale hotels a discrete distance east. The construction of Island Village, a major shopping and entertainment complex, has spruced up 'Ochi.' In 1968, the Jamaica Villa Association (JAVA) was created to represent the growing number of villas in Jamaica. Ocho Rios has seen the rise of luxury villas, with beachfront, ocean, and mountain views.

Today, Ocho Rios extends 6.4 kilometres (4 mi) between Dunn's River Falls, 3.2 kilometres (2 mi) to the west of the town centre, and the White River, 3.2 kilometres (2 mi) to the east. Almost all the development outside the centre is to the east.

== In popular culture ==
The town was a shooting location during the filming of Dr. No, the first James Bond film, released in 1962. The Sans Souci hotel was used as the exterior of the Blue Mountain cottage, the home of Bond villain Miss Taro. A decade later, the town was used again in a Bond film in 1973's Live and Let Die.

James Cameron's first film, 1982's Piranha II: The Spawning, was filmed at the Mallards Beach-Hyatt Hotel in Ocho Rios, which doubled for the film's Club Elysium.

The British band 10cc reference the town in the track titled "From Rochdale to Ocho Rios" from their album Bloody Tourists.

== Education ==
=== High Schools ===
- Ocho Rios High School

== Notable people ==
- O'Brian White - footballer
