= Bog Walk =

- Town
- Location within Jamaica
- Coordinates: 18.10205°N 77.00541°W
- Country: Jamaica
- Parish: St Catherine

Population
  - Estimate (2009): 13,889

Bog Walk is a town in the parish of Saint Catherine, Jamaica.

In 1898 work started on a hydroelectric power plant on the Rio Cobre near Bog Walk. The plant (1,500 H.P.) was completed the next year and used to power Kingston's tramway system (until then the cars were hauled by pairs of mules). In a June 1904 accident, 33 workers died while cleaning the huge water pipe feeding the power station. The plant, one of the earliest in the Western Hemisphere, was closed in August 1966.
