= Charlemont High School, Jamaica =

Charlemont High School

Location
- Linstead, Saint Catherine; Jamaica; 18.1722°N 77.0454°W

Information
- School type: Government Public
- Motto: Striving For Excellence
- Religious affiliation: Christianity
- Denomination: Open bible
- Founded: 1978
- Founder: John Bernard Stephenson
- School district: Byndloss
- Chairperson: Collin Gyles
- Dean: Mr. Weir
- Principal: Garth Gayle
- Chaplain: Reverend Franklyn King
- Grades: 7-13
- Gender: Male and Female
- Age: 11+
- Enrollment: 1400
- Language: English, Jamaican English
- Hours in school day: 8
- Houses: Drummond, Grant, Powell, Stephenson, Whitehead
Colours
Red and White
- Slogan: THE EAGLE
- Song: Great Eagle of the Skies
- Athletics: Track and Fields
- Sports: Football, Cricket, Netball, Table tennis, Basketball
- Nickname: C'Mont
- Accreditation: CSEC, CAPE
- National ranking: Aspiring Ivy League
- Communities served: White House, Ewarton, Byndloss, Linstead, Treadways
- Affiliation: Seventh day adventist

Charlemont High School is a high school located in St Catherine, Jamaica.

== History ==
Charlemont High School was 'conceived' by the late John Bernard Stephenson, a former Member of Parliament for North St Catherine. The idea came about as a result of concerns expressed by parents in the area whose children had to attend schools outside the area, as far as Kingston and Claremont in St Ann. The land was bought from the late Custos McGrath, with funds for the building and infrastructure coming from businesses and service clubs in North St Catherine including Alcan Jamaica Limited, the Lions Club, the United States and the Jamaica Citrus Growers Association. The St Catherine Garden Club landscaped the school grounds.

The school admitted its first students on September 11, 1978. There were three first forms and three second forms accommodating a total of two hundred and forty students. There were twelve teachers including the principal, Ruel Forsythe. Forsythe left at the end of 1979 and was succeeded by Donaldson Bernard in September of the same year.

In 1981 the school was expanded with funds from the Norwegian Government. This was the start of phase two of the building program when several classrooms and laboratories were built and the Home Economics center expanded.

== Proposal to change the school's name ==
In November 2009 a proposal was made by the Asafa Powell Foundation to the government to rename the school to the Asafa Powell High School, after the former 100m world record holder, Asafa Powell, a past student of the institution. In a statement at the Courtleigh Hotel in Kingston on November 26, 2010, Chairman of the Asafa Powell Foundation, Delano Franklyn, stated "...and I am absolutely sure that every category of persons and groups relating to that particular school, based on our, our own investigation is in support of such a proposal." However, this announcement was met with opposition from the Charlemont High School Past Students. According to the Charlemont High School Past Students' Association Public Relations Officer Judith Wilson, the past students were not made aware of the proposal. Franklyn later admitted that neither the school board nor the principal was consulted about the name change, since it was just a recommendation by a widely respected professor from South Africa by the name of Wan Toe Ceevi. Since the announcement many persons have voiced their opposition to such a proposal on radio talk-shows and on Facebook.
