= Linstead =

- Town
- Location within Jamaica
- Coordinates: 18°8′24.55″N 77°2′47.08″W
- Country: Jamaica
- Parish: St. Catherine

Population (2011)
  - Total: 15,231

Linstead is a town in the parish of St. Catherine, Jamaica, in the West Indies. In 2011 its population was 15,231. It is located 12 miles (19 km) NNW of Spanish Town.

== Description ==
Close to Ewarton and Windalco Ewarton works, a large aluminum plant employing many of the local population. Often employing a job share scheme as work in the area is scarce. It holds a Grand Market celebration each Christmas Eve when people come out and fill the streets, small shops sell toys and other Christmas gifts, and events and parties are held in the square. It was popularized in the song Linstead Market.

== Schools ==
- Charlemont High School
- Linstead Primary and Junior High School
- Dinthill Technical High
- Rosemount Primary and Junior High
- Redwood primary school
- Victoria All Age
- Trinity Preparatory
- Saint Dominic Preparatory School
- Bread of Life Christian Academy
- Mickleton Preparatory
- Victoria Primary
- Wakefield Primary
- McGrath High School

== Transportation ==
The A1 road passes directly through Linstead, while the B13 also crosses the town, running through it via Main Road and the Linstead–Oracabessa Road. The town is served by the Linstead/Ewarton interchange on T3, the Edward Seaga Highway, where a tolled access road connects the A1 to the highway, providing service to both Linstead and Ewarton.

== Notable natives ==
- Joseph Hill - singer (Culture)
- Clive Hunt - musician and reggae producer
- Hedley Jones - musician
- Leslie Laing - Olympic gold medalist in 4x400 m relay.
- Keith Anthony Morrison - artist, educator, critic, curator and administrator
- Asafa Powell - athlete
- Lloyd Reese - singer-songwriter
- Arthur Wint - Olympic gold medalist in the 400
- Vitel Lawes - cricketer
