= Linstead Primary and Junior High School =

Linstead Primary & Junior High
- Linstead School

Location
- 12 East Avenue; Linstead; Jamaica
- Coordinates: 18.1352°N 77.0276°W

Information
- Motto: Hats off to the past; Coats off for the future
- Established: c. 1900
- Principal: Loretta Henry
- Teaching staff: ~69
- Website: www.linsteadschool.netfirms.com

Linstead Primary & Junior High is an elementary school in Linstead, Jamaica; one of oldest in the island. Despite several official name changes it has always been colloquially known as Linstead School.

The school is attended by students from Linstead and many neighbouring communities. It operates a two shift system in order to accommodate the maximum possible number of students. The first shift is for Grades 1–6, the second for Grades 7–9. Students from 26 neighbouring schools transfer in for grades 7–9. They sit the Junior High School Certificate Examination at Grade 9 prior to transferring to a high school based on their performance in the examination.

The school hosts an evening institute for adult education. This is attended by people from a wide area including Jubilee Town, Cedar Valley, Redwood, Berwick, Bonnet, Jericho, Lluidas Vale, Bermaddy, York Street, and Juan-de-Bolas. It provides courses in barbecue, census enumeration, Jam-Can Group, Peace Corps Group, training of electorate personnel and CXC classes.

There is an active Parent and Teachers Association, which supports education week and careers day.

The school is a designated earthquake and hurricane shelter.

== History ==
The school was founded c. 1900 as Linstead Government School in a one-room wooden building on 0.75 acres (0.30 ha) on Main Street near the hospital and the Police Station. The site is now the Linstead Health Centre on King Street. 18.1345755°N 77.0324636°W The room was divided into nine classes using chalkboards as partitions; there were no offices but there were proper toilet facilities, piped water, canteen and head teacher's cottage.

By 1924 there were about 300 students and 9 teachers.

The school's name was changed c. 1946 to Linstead All-Age School and overcrowding became a problem due to the school's popularity.

By the mid-1950s the buildings were becoming dilapidated with the rot in floors and ceilings.

By 1962 there were over 900 students and in 1964 a new school was built on 7 acres (2.8 ha) on East Avenue, being put into use from the September. It was officially opened on 1965-01-31 by the Hon. Edwin Allen, Minister of Education.

In the late 1960s an evening institute was started for use by adults.

By 1979 there were nearly 2,600 students in buildings designed for 1,250; the number of students was gradually reduced over the following years to a more realistic level.

In 1998 the shift system was introduced to increase the number of students who could be accommodated and the school was reclassified and renamed Linstead Primary and Junior High School with subject teaching in Grades 7–9 now required. In 1999 the school was selected to join the New Horizon Project which aimed to increase the literacy and numeracy levels of primary students.

At the turn of the century the school was receiving financial support from various banks (NCB, JN, RBTT, BNS) and other companies including Cable and Wireless Jamaica Ltd and Nestle Jamaica Ltd.

By September 2003 there were 69 staff and just over 2000 students.

== Insignia ==
- The school's motto "Hats off to the past; Coats off for the future" was created by Lester E Smart, then head teacher.
- The school emblem was designed by Loretta Morgan, a teacher.
- The school magazine is The Genesis.

== Principals ==
Name	Appointed
Teacher Marsh	c. 1900
Joseph William King	1924
Lester E Smart	1946
Ansell White	1979-10-29
Esme Hemans	1997
Loretta Henry	2003–09

== Notable alumni ==
- Rattary Lamb
