= John Bernard Stephenson =

Jamaican lawyer and politician

John Bernard Stephenson (November 24, 1938 – March 30, 1982), also called Jack Stephenson was a Jamaican lawyer and PNP Member of Parliament for Saint Catherine North Western and founder of the Charlemont High School, Jamaica.

== Accomplishments ==
Speaking at a Founder's Day celebration at the Charlemont High school, Mrs. Precious Ramsaran said he "had renovated and expanded the Linstead Market, constructed the Linstead Health Centre, built a food-processing factory on White House Road, and had been instrumental in the construction of the White House and Charlemont Housing Development." She is also noted as saying he "conceptualized and built the Linstead By-Pass."

Jack Stephenson is credited with being an instrumental part of the Charlemont Farmers' Cooperative. In a Jamaica-Gleaner letter to the editor, Sepie Dawes remarks that it "died when he died".

Jack Stephenson Boulevard in Linstead, St. Catherine is named in his honour.
