= Keith Anthony Morrison =

Jamaican painter (1942–2026)

- Born: May 20, 1942; Linstead, Saint Catherine Parish, Jamaica
- Died: June 1, 2026 (aged 84)
- Education: School of the Art Institute of Chicago (BFA, MFA)
- Occupations: Painter, printmaker, educator, art critic, curator, academic administrator
- Notable work: Zombie Jamboree (1988)
- Movement: Surrealism
- Awards: Jamaican Commander in the Order of Distinction (2017)

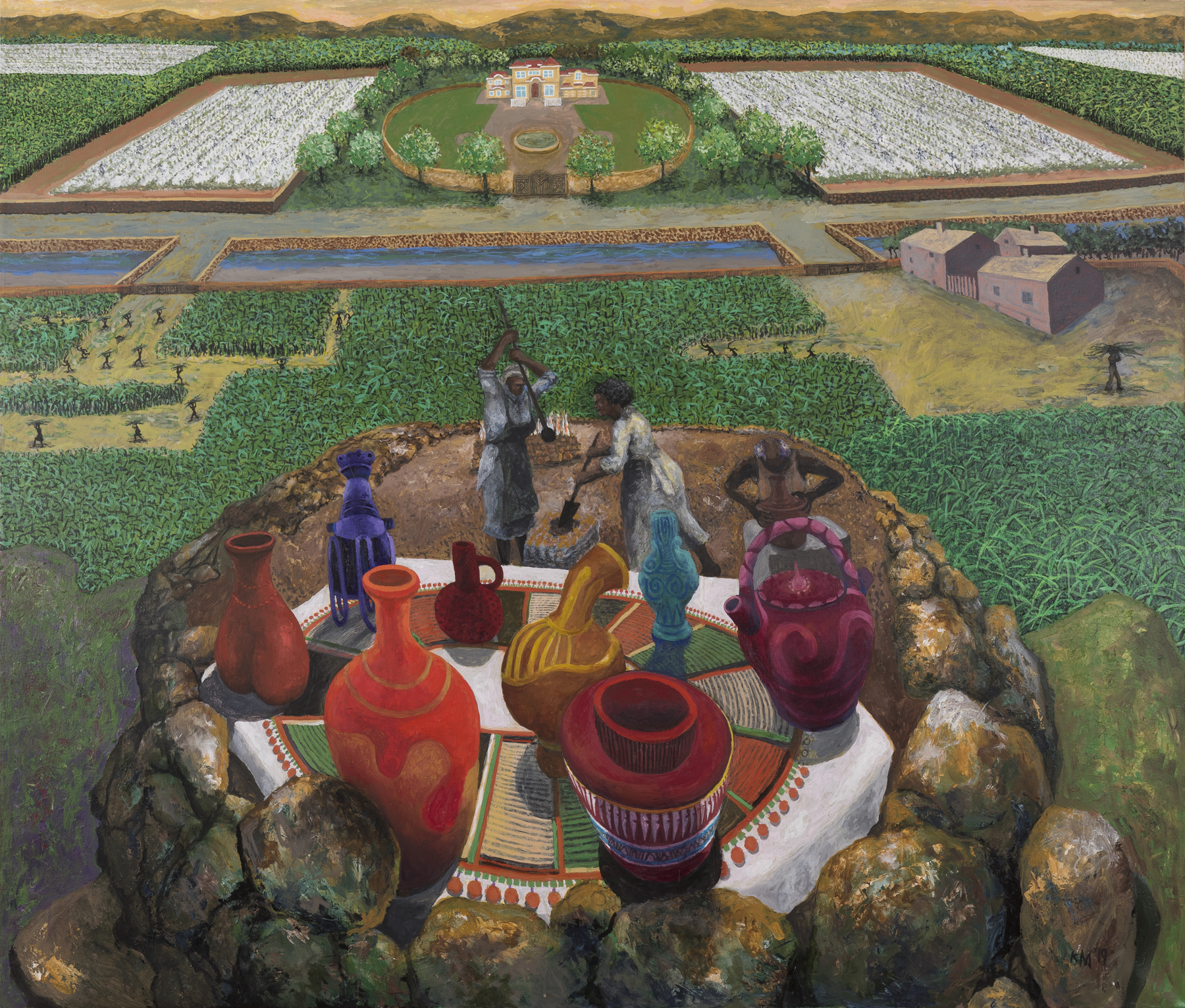
Transcendence, 60 X 76, acrylic, 2019

Keith Anthony Morrison (May 20, 1942 – June 1, 2026) was a Jamaican-born American painter, printmaker, educator, critic, curator and academic administrator. He was professor emeritus in the Tyler School of Art at Temple University in Philadelphia. Morrison was an abstract painter from 1965 until 1985, which was followed by works in a figurative painting-style that are surrealist as well as draw on his Caribbean heritage.

== Early life and education ==
Keith Anthony Morrison was born on May 20, 1942, in Linstead in Saint Catherine Parish, Jamaica, to parents Beatrice and Noel Morrison. His mother was a nurse and his father was a railroad worker. His earliest exposure to visual art was during his time at Calabar High School in Kingston, Jamaica.

He received a BFA degree (1963), and a MFA degree (1965) both from the School of the Art Institute of Chicago.

Morrison was a United States citizen.

== Publications and curatorial work ==
Morrison's work has been featured in many publications, including the book African Diaspora in the Cultures of Latin America, the Caribbean, and the United States (2014), an anthology of essays by 14 scholars; the J. Paul Getty Museum's Mortality/Immortality?; Myth and Magic in the Americas (1999): the Eighties, by Charles Mereweather/Museum of Modern Art, Monterrey, Mexico; Lucy R. Lippards' Mixed Blessings (1990); Regenia A. Perry's Free Within Ourselves: African-American Artists in the Collection of the National Museum of American Art (1992); David Driskell's Contemporary Visual Expressions: The Art of Martha Jackson-Jarvis, Keith Morrison, and William T. Williams (1987); Samella Lewis’ Caribbean Visions: Contemporary Painting and Sculpture (1995); Richard Powell's Black Art and Culture in the 20th Century; Virginia Mecklenburg's African American Art from the Harlem Renaissance to the Civil Rights Era and Beyond, Smithsonian Institution; Veerle Poupeye’s Caribbean Art; Crystal Britton’s African–American Art: The Long Hard Struggle; Judith Bettelheim's essay "A Transnational Artist with a Jamaica Soul", African Arts Magazine, 1996; and Art in Chicago: The First 50 Years, 1996. Keith Morrison, a biography, Pomegranate Press, was written by Rene Ater in 2004.

In 2022, Morrison curated "Caribbean Visions," an exhibition of 20 internationally distinguished artists of Caribbean descent, at the Katzen Arts Center in Washington, D.C.. An extensive color catalog accompanied the exhibition.

In 2019 the Katzen Arts Center in Washington, D.C. held a large solo exhibition of Morrison’s paintings on canvas and watercolors on paper. The exhibition, curated by Judith Stein, former chief curator of the Pennsylvania Academy of the Fine Arts, was accompanied by a color catalog. In 2012 an exhibition of Morrison's paintings, titled "The Middle Passage," curated by Julie McGee, was held at the University of Delaware Museums. Fourteen international scholars were assembled to make presentations at a symposium that was created around the exhibition. In 2014 the book African Diaspora in the Cultures of Latin America, the Caribbean, and the United States, edited by Persephone Braham (University of Delaware Press), was published to document the symposium that was formed around Morrison's art.

Morrison curated many other exhibitions, including "Magical Visions," an exhibition of 10 international African-American artists, at the University of Delaware Museums, 20012. The exhibition included art by Terry Adkins, Sonya Clark, Melvin Edwards, Sam Gilliam, Barkley L. Hendricks, Kalup Linzy, Odili Odita, Karyn Olivier, Faith Ringgold, and William T. Williams. Morrison curated The Curator's Eye III: 'Ceremony in Space, Time and Sound,' Multimedia and Performance Art in Jamaica, National Gallery of Art, Kingston, Jamaica, in 2008. The exhibition included 14 Jamaican artists, some living abroad but most at home. The exhibition included more traditional art, such as painting, sculpture, and ceramics, and newer kinds of art, such as video and performance art. Morrison's idea was to show that Jamaica was a source of some new art ideas, comparable to anywhere in the world. The exhibition was accompanied by a catalog, which Morrison wrote, describing the exhibition's concept and articulating ideas in it. The catalog included a biography of each artist.

In 1999 Morrison traveled to Cuba and, with the help of the Ludwig Foundation of Cuba, organized an exhibition of contemporary Cuban artists, which he toured to the US and exhibited at San Francisco State University. The exhibition, accompanied by a catalog the curator wrote, included lithographs, photographs, videos and film.

In 1985, Morrison curated, Art in Washington and Its African American Presence: 1940–1970, an exhibition of more than 60 artists and more than 50 works of African art at the Washington Project for the Arts Gallery in Washington, DC. The 60+ artists were American, African, Caribbean, European, and others of mixed heritage. He borrowed their art from Howard University, the Barnett Aden Collection, the Corcoran Gallery of Art, the Phillips Collection, and private collectors. The 50+ African works were classical pieces he borrowed from the Smithsonian Institution.

Working with Warren Robbins, founding Director of the Museum of African Art, Smithsonian Institution, Morrison conceived an exhibition that linked African Art, African-American art, art by Caucasians in the USA, the art of the Caribbean, European art, and art of South America. The exhibition and accompanying researched book-length color catalog, which Morrison wrote, revealed the important contribution to American art that was made by Howard University and the Barnett-Aden Gallery in the development of not only African-American art, or even American art, but world art in general. The exhibition included artists from countries such as Brazil, Cuba, Ethiopia, France, Germany, Haiti, Nigeria, Sudan, Switzerland, the USA and the UK and showed the global scope of thinking that originated among African-American artists, curators, and scholars of the era, such as W. E. B. DuBois, Langston Hughes, Alain Locke, James Porter, Alonzo Aden and James Herring. Some, including the Washington Post and the Washington Times, called it one of the most important exhibitions in the history of Washington.

In 1969 Morrison curated the exhibition Jacob Lawrence’s Toussaint L’Ouverture Series at DePaul University Gallery, Chicago. The exhibition included 39 works from Jacob Lawrence's historic series of paintings. In 1996 Morrison curated "Contemporary Print Images," a Smithsonian Institution International Travel Exhibition to the National Museum, Bamako, Mali; American Cultural Center, Niamey, Niger; School of Fine Arts Gallery, Makerere University, Kampala, Uganda; and Municipal Gallery, Addis Ababa, Ethiopia. He curated Black Art '71, Bergman Gallery, University of Chicago; African-American Art in Washington (Sam Gilliam, Martha Jackson Jarvis, Joyce J. Scott Joyce Scott, Jerome Meadows, Sylvia Snowden, Sherman Fleming), WPA Gallery; Art from Washington. Nexus Gallery, Philadelphia; Prints at the Brandywine Workshop, Philadelphia; "Metaphor/Commentaries: Artists from Cuba (1999); "The Curator's Eye," National Gallery of Art, Kingston, Jamaica, (2008); and "Magical Visions," (including Terry Adkins, Sonya Clark, Melvin Edwards, Sam Gilliam, Barkley L. Hendricks, Kalup Linzy, Karyn Olivia, Odilli Odita, Faith Ringgold, William T. Williams (the University of Delaware Museum, (2012). In 2022, he curated "Caribbean Transitions" at the Katzen Museum, Washington DC.

He served as an art consultant for many state arts agencies in the United States. He was a former commentator for the weekly TV program Around Town, broadcast by WETA-TV in Washington DC.

A writer and critic, Morrison published articles, essays, catalogs, and reviews in periodicals, newspapers, and museum catalogs and was an editor for the New Art Examiner. He is the author of Art in Washington and Its Afro-American Presence: 1940-1970, Stephenson Press, VA, 1985. He wrote "Caribbean Transitions, Katzen Museum, 2022. He wrote Pin-Pricked Deities, the Art of Joyce Scott," Baltimore Museum 2000. He co-authored with David C. Driskell, Juanita Holland, and others: "Narratives of African American Art and Identity, Smithsonian Institution, 1999. He contributed articles to numerous publications, including more than 40 articles for the New Art Examiner (where he was guest editor); articles for American Visions, the Washington Post, the USIA, the University of Chicago, and the Smithsonian Institution. He has written catalog essays for museums such as the Baltimore Museum of Art, the Corcoran Gallery of Art, the M.H. de Young Memorial Museum, the Getty Museum, the Alternative Museum, and Pomegranate Press; and Stephenson Press. He wrote the catalog essay "Ceremony in Space Sound and Time" at the National Gallery of Jamaica, essays for the Brandywine Workshop, the University of Chicago, and the catalog essay "Magical Visions", at the University of Delaware Museums.

Morrison consulted on art for many agencies, public and private. In 1971 he was consultant, briefly, to the Caribbean author John Hearne at the Creative Art Centre at the University of the West Indies, Jamaica; and to collector/proprietor A. D. Scott, on Jamaican art, at the Olympia Gallery, Kingston, Jamaica. Morrison served on several artboards and state agencies in Massachusetts, Pennsylvania, Maryland, Virginia, Tennessee, Illinois, and California in the US. He was a cultural and economic consultant for the Harlem Urban Development Corporation, New York, NY.

He was a frequent panelist on the weekly television show Around Town in Washington, D.C., between 1998 and 2002. Morrison made numerous other TV appearances, some in Jamaica but most in the US. Maryland Public TV made a film of his work 1n 1990. PBS featured his curated exhibition Magical Visions in 2012. He was one of five international artists featured in the PBS film Free Within Ourselves.

In 2017, Morrison's book, "Art in Washington and Its Afro-American Presence: 1940-1970," was the foundation for the National Gallery of Art's Symposium on African-American Art in Washington, D.C. in the Mid-Twentieth Century.

Morrison's work has been reviewed in many publications, including the Jamaica Gleaner, Jamaica Observer, New York Times, New Yorker. Art News, Art Forum, Art in America, Smithsonian Magazine, New Art Examiner, Chicago Sun Times, Chicago Tribune, Washington Post, Washington Times, San Francisco Chronicle, and African Arts.

== Academia ==
His first teaching appointment was as an art instructor at Roosevelt High School in Gary, Indiana, from 1965 to 1967.

Morrison served as an associate professor and chair of the art department at DePaul University, Chicago, from 1969 to 1971. He successfully proposed and wrote undergraduate degree programs in art and art education.

He was assistant professor of art at Fisk University, an HBCU in Nashville, Tennessee, from 1967 to 1969.

Morrison was appointed associate dean of the college of architecture and art at the University of Illinois, Chicago from 1972 to 1976; and an associate professor of art (while serving as associate dean) at the University of Illinois, Chicago from 1974 to 1979.

In 1979, he became only the fourth African American to be appointed full professor in the history of the University of Maryland, College Park (UMCP), where he taught until 1992. From 1987 to 1992, he was chair of the art department, at the University of Maryland, College Park. At the University of Maryland, he created a lecture series for women and minorities, which brought lecturers from across the country. He was appointed Chair of the UMCP art department from 1989 until his departure in 1992.

From January 1993 to June 1994, he was dean for academic affairs at the San Francisco Art Institute. From May 1994 to July 1996, he was dean of the college of creative arts at San Francisco State University.

From August 1996 to January 1997, he was dean of the college of arts and humanities at the University of Maryland, College Park.

In February 1997, he returned to his former position of dean of the college of creative arts at San Francisco State University, a position he held until 2005. At San Francisco State, he raised funds, created festivals and exhibitions in art, film, music, and theatre. He was also the founder and director of the annual John Handy Jazz Festival, held at San Francisco State University, from 2000 to 2001.

He was appointed dean for the Tyler School of Arts at Temple University from 2005 to 2008. At Tyler, he restructured the budget, expanded the programs internationally to include Africa, Asia, Central, and South America, and added many faculty and lab technicians.

Morrison was also a visiting faculty at several institutions, including as the visiting Chaves/King Professor, at the University of Michigan, Ann Arbor, with a joint appointment in the School of Art and the Institute for the Humanities, in the spring of 1990. He lectured at numerous art schools and universities across us, in Cuba, Japan, Taiwan, and Liberia, and many universities across China. He was Professor Emeritus in the Tyler School of Art, Temple University.

== Death ==
Morrison died June 1, 2026, at the age of 84.

== Distinctions ==
Morrison earned many awards and distinctions, including the title of Commander in the Order of Distinction (CD), Jamaica, 2017; the Lifetime Achievement Award from the Brandywine Workshop, 2013; a Ford Foundation award; Danforth Foundation award; Bi-Centennial Award for Painting in Chicago; Award for Painting from the Organization of African States, 1979; Caribbean Biannual, 1994; 49th Venice Biennale, 2001; National Award for Educators in the Arts; "Caribbean person of the Bay Area," California, 1993; U.S. State Department Cultural Envoy to the Shanghai Biennale, 2008; and Fulbright Award, 2009.

== Collections ==
His works are included in public collections, including those of the National Gallery of Jamaica; the Cincinnati Art Museum; the Art Institute of Chicago; the Smithsonian American Art Museum in Washington, D.C.; the Pennsylvania Academy of the Fine Art in Philadelphia; the Philadelphia Museum of Art; the Corcoran Gallery of Art in Washington, D.C.; the National Museum of American Art; the Pérez Art Museum Miami; and the Museum of Modern Art in Monterrey, Mexico.

== Bibliography ==
- Stein, Judith: Passages: Keith Morrison: 1999-2019, Katzen Art Center, Washington DC, June–August, 2019.
- Edmunds, Allan: Keith Morrison, Lifetime Achievement, Brandywine Workshop, May 2013.
- Knight, Franklin, "Art of Keith Morrison", Jamaica Observer, November 2011.
- McGee, Julie: Keith Morrison: The Middle Passage, University of Delaware Museums, September 7, 2011.
- Chen-Young, Leisha: "An Artistic Eye", Jamaica Observer, June 15, 2008.
- Ater, Rene: Keith Morrison, Pomegranate Press, 2005.
- Driskell, David C: The Other Side of Color; San Francisco: Pomegranate Press, 2001.
- Amidon, Catherine: Migration, Transition, and Change; New York: Venice Biennale, 2001.
- Morrison, Keith. "Preserving Whose Mortality or Immortality?" pp. 161–164, Mortality/Immortality?: The Legacy of 20th Century Art. Miguel Angel Corzo, editor, Los Angeles: The Getty Conservation Institute, 1999.
- Bettelheim, Judith A. "Three Transnational Artists: Jose Bedia, Eduoard Duval-Carrié and Keith Morrison." pp. 43–48, The International Review of African American Art, 1998, Vol. 15, No. 3.
- Burgard, Timothy Anglin. Art and Ethnography, San Francisco: M.H. de Young Memorial Museum, 1998.
- Poupeye, Veerle. Caribbean Art, New York: Thames and Hudson, 1998.
- Powell, Richard. Black Art and Culture in the Twentieth Century, London: Thames and Hudson, 1997.
- Baker, Kenneth. "Keith Morrison's Art is the Stuff of Dreams", p. E1, San Francisco Chronicle, April 13, 1996.
- Berkson, Bill. Chaos Dancer, San Francisco: Bomani Gallery, 1996.
- Bettelheim, Judith. A Transnational Artist with a Jamaica Soul, San Francisco: Bomani Gallery, 1996.
- Art in Chicago, 1945-95, Chicago: Museum of Contemporary Art, 1996.
- Britton, Crystal A. African American Art: The Long Struggle, New York: Smithmark, 1996.
- Lewis, Samella. Caribbean Visions, Richmond, VA: Art Services International, 1995.
- Driskell, David C., editor, African American Visual Aesthetics: A Postmodernist View (Smithsonian Institution Press, 1995).
- Risatti, Howard. "Keith Morrison at Brody Gallery" p. 108, Artforum, January 1992.
- Perry, Regina A. Free Within Ourselves: African-American Artists in the Collection of the National Museum of American Art. pp. 147–149, Washington, DC: National Museum of American Art, Smithsonian Institution, 1992.
- Mereweather, Charles: Myth and Magic, In the Americas: The Eighties; Monterrey: Museum of Modern Art, 1991.
- Lippard, Lucy. Mixed Blessings: New Art in a Multicultural America, New York: Pantheon Books, 1990.
- Smith, Roberta. "The Galleries of TriBeCa and What's in Them" p. C22, The New York Times, April 27, 1990.
- Driskell, David C. Keith Morrison: Interpreter of the Mythic Dream, New York: Alternative Museum, 1990.
- Powell, Richard. Anansi Revisited: Keith Morrison's New Work, New York: Alternative Museum, 1990.
- Francis, Irma Talabi. "Keith Morrison: Spiritual Obsession", Eyewash, November 1990.
- Powell, Richard, The Blues Aesthetics, WPA, Washington DC, 2001.
- Driskell, David C. Contemporary Visual Expressions, Smithsonian Press, 1987.
- Forgey, Benjamin. "Urban Expressions: Contemporary Art Opens at Anacostia." p. G7, The Washington Post, May 16, 1987.
- Bontemps, Arna Alexander. Choosing. Washington DC: Museum Press, 1985, pp. 60–61.
- Laing, E. K. "Why it's important to bring black artists out of cultural isolation." p. 29, The Christian Science Monitor, November 20, 1985.
- Richard, Paul. "Black Artists: Their Pride & Problems: Keith Morrison"; The Washington Post, March 15, 19.
- East/West: Contemporary American Art; Los Angeles: California Afro-American Museum, 1985.
- Livingston, Jane: Ten + Ten + Ten; Washington, D.C.: Corcoran Gallery of Art, 1984.
- Cederholm, Theresa Dickason, editor, Afro-American Artists (Boston Public Library, 1973).
