= Lloyd Reece =

Jamaican musician (born 1957–58)

- Born: Lloyd Alphonso Reece; 1957 or 1958; Linstead, St. Catherine, Jamaica
- Occupations: Musician; motivational speaker; guidance counselor
- Years active: 1990s–present
- Musical career
- Genres: Gospel

Lloyd Alphonso Reece (born 1957 or 1958), also known as Father Reece, is a Jamaican gospel musician.

== Early life ==
Reece was born in Linstead, Jamaica, in 1957 or 1958.

== Criminal history ==
In 1983, Reece committed a double murder in Clarendon Parish. He was convicted by a court and spent 12 years on death row, being sentenced to be hanged.

His sentence was commuted to life imprisonment in 1994. He was then put in a prison rehabilitation program, being allowed to go to the All Saints Apostolic Church in Spanish Town.

In 2002, Reece broke out of prison and ended up on the run. Police did not recapture him until May 21, 2005. He was later freed from prison, becoming a motivational speaker and guidance counselor.

== Musical career ==
While he was in prison, he was said to have written over 150 songs. In 1996, he began entering the yearly Jamaica Festival Song Competition. Three years later, in 1998, he was allowed to leave the prison to record his song "One Love JA", which placed second. In 2000, he recorded his first demo tape, which was used in the selection process.

In 2021, his song "Jamaicans Talawah" was a finalist during that year's edition of the competition.
