= Asafa Powell =

Jamaican sprinter (born 1982)

Asafa Powell CD
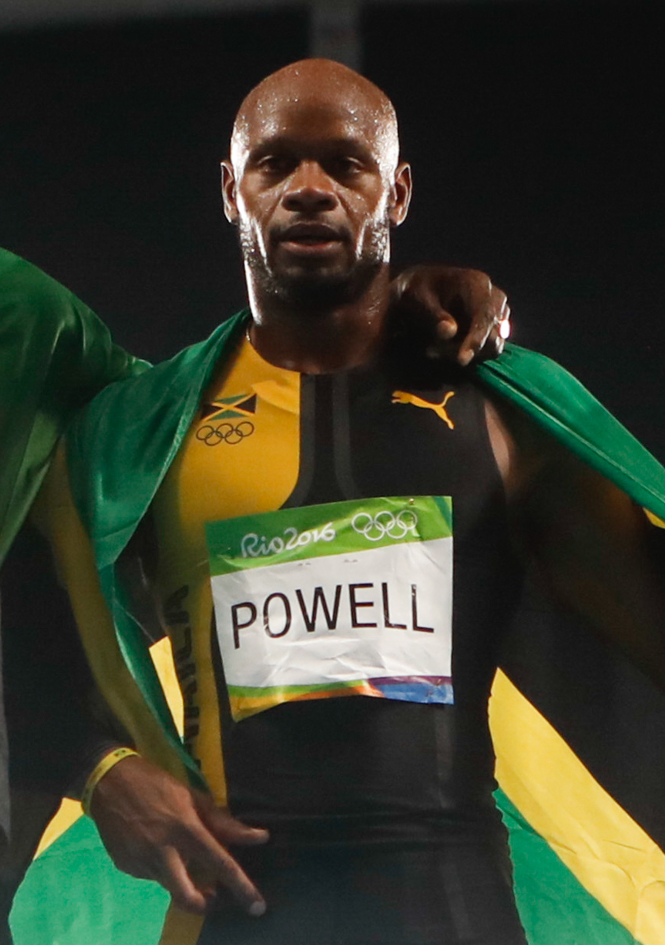
- Asafa Powell at the Rio 2016 Olympics

Personal information
- Nationality: Jamaican
- Born: 23 November 1982 (age 43) Spanish Town, Jamaica
- Height: 1.91 m (6 ft 3 in)
- Weight: 93 kg (205 lb)
- Relatives: Donovan Powell (brother); Alex Powell (cousin)

Sport
- Sport: Track and field
- Events: 100 metres, 200 metres
- Club: MVP Track & Field Club
- Coached by: Stephen Francis

Achievements and titles
- Personal bests: 60 m: 6.44 s NR (Portland, 2016) 100 yd: 9.07 s WB (Ostrava, 2010); 100 m: 9.72 s (Lausanne, 2008); 200 m: 19.90 s (Kingston, 2006) 400 m: 45.94 s (Sydney, 2009)
Medal record
Men's athletics
Representing Jamaica
| Event | 1st | 2nd | 3rd |
|---|---|---|---|
| Olympic Games | 1 | 0 | 0 |
| World Championships | 2 | 1 | 2 |
| World Athletics Final | 5 | 1 | 0 |
| World Indoor Championships | 0 | 1 | 0 |
| Commonwealth Games | 2 | 1 | 0 |
| Total | 10 | 4 | 2 |
Olympic Games
| Gold medal – first place | 2016 Rio de Janeiro | 4 × 100 m relay |
| Disqualified | 2008 Beijing | 4 × 100 m relay |
World Championships
| Gold medal – first place | 2009 Berlin | 4 × 100 m relay |
| Gold medal – first place | 2015 Beijing | 4 × 100 m relay |
| Silver medal – second place | 2007 Osaka | 4 × 100 m relay |
| Bronze medal – third place | 2007 Osaka | 100 m |
| Bronze medal – third place | 2009 Berlin | 100 m |
World Indoor Championships
| Silver medal – second place | 2016 Portland | 60 m |
World Athletics Final
| Gold medal – first place | 2004 Monaco | 100 m |
| Gold medal – first place | 2004 Monaco | 200 m |
| Gold medal – first place | 2006 Stuttgart | 100 m |
| Gold medal – first place | 2007 Stuttgart | 100 m |
| Gold medal – first place | 2008 Stuttgart | 100 m |
| Silver medal – second place | 2009 Thessaloniki | 100 m |
Diamond League
| Winner | 2011 | 100 metres |
| Winner | 2016 | 100 metres |
Commonwealth Games
| Gold medal – first place | 2006 Melbourne | 100 m |
| Gold medal – first place | 2006 Melbourne | 4 × 100 m relay |
| Silver medal – second place | 2002 Manchester | 4 × 100 m relay |
Pan American Junior Championships
| Silver medal – second place | 2001 Santa Fe | 4 × 100 meters relay |

Asafa Powell CD (born 23 November 1982) is a Jamaican retired sprinter who specialised in the 100 metres. He set the 100 metres world record twice, between June 2005 and May 2008 with times of 9.77 and 9.74 seconds. Powell has consistently broken the 10-second barrier in competition, with his personal best of 9.72 s ranking fourth on the all-time list of men's 100-metre athletes. As of 1 September 2016, Powell has broken the 10-second barrier more times than anyone else—97 times. He currently holds the world record for the 100-yard dash with a time of 9.07 s, set on 27 May 2010 in Ostrava, Czech Republic. In 2016, he became Olympic champion in the 4 × 100 metres relay.

Powell competed in the 100 m at the 2004, 2008 and 2012 Olympics, finishing fifth in 2004 and 2008 and eighth after injuring his groin during the race in 2012. At the 2007 Osaka World Championships, he achieved a bronze and a silver medal in the 100 m and 4 × 100 m relay respectively, and he was successful at the Commonwealth Games, winning twice plus achieving a silver medal. At the 2009 World Championships, he achieved the 100 m bronze and became champion in the relay. Powell has won five times at the IAAF World Athletics Final and was the former 100 m world record holder in the event.

In 2013, Powell tested positive for the stimulant oxilofrine along with teammate Sherone Simpson and voluntarily withdrew from the 2013 World Athletics Championships as a result, though both maintained they did not take any banned supplements knowingly or willfully. On 10 April 2014, they received an 18-month suspension from competing, which was set to expire in December that year. However the Court of Arbitration for Sport (CAS) lifted both athletes' suspensions on 14 July 2014, finding that the positive tests were caused by the presence of oxilofrine, undisclosed by the manufacturer, in a supplement taken by the pair. Powell won a lawsuit against the supplement company for failing to disclose the banned stimulant.

== Biography and sprinting career ==
Born in Spanish Town, Jamaica, Asafa Powell is the youngest of six sons of two ministers. Asafa attended Ewarton Primary School and Charlemont High School, both in St. Catherine, Jamaica. Powell planned to be a mechanic before he took up running while studying in Kingston, Jamaica. His eldest brother Donovan, was a 60 m finalist in the 1999 World Indoor Championships. Running runs in the family: His brothers clocked 9.5 seconds for the 100 yd dash, his mother 11.4 s, and his father 10.2 s. Powell is a member of the MVP (Maximising Velocity and Power) Track & Field Club based at the University of Technology, Jamaica and has been coached by Stephen Francis since 2001.

=== 2000–2005: Early career ===
Powell represented his school Charlemont High at the ISSA High School Championships. On 11 April he finished fourth in the Class 1 200 m, in 23.07 with a −1.7 m/s headwind. On 13 April, he finished third in his heat of the Boy's Class 1 100 m, recording 11.45 with a −2.3 m/s headwind. Neither time recorded in the heats was quick enough to advance him to the next round of competition.

Powell again represented Charlemont High at the ISSA High School Boy And Girls Championships, finishing seventh in the Class 1 100 m Final. Recognizing some talent, coach Stephen Francis started coaching Powell one week later. The coach looked for a way to give the tall teenager a faster start. After searching the island, Stephen Francis found a 100 m stretch of road with a 10% slope and trains his runners on that. Powell vindicated Francis by winning the Boys Under-20 100 m event in 10.50 seconds at the JAAA National Championships on 22 June.

At the 2002 Commonwealth Games in Manchester, Powell finished fifth in the semi-finals of the 100 m event, setting a personal best of 10.26 s. Powell, along with Michael Frater, Dwight Thomas and Christopher Williams formed the Jamaican 4 × 100 m relay team that went on to win a silver medal. Powell finished just behind Darren Campbell in the last leg of the relay, with both men finishing in 38.62 s.

Powell won the Jamaican 100 m National Championship in 2003.

Powell came to attention within the world of athletics at the 2003 World Championships, when he suffered the ignominy of being 'the other athlete' disqualified for a false start in the quarter-final. This was when Jon Drummond memorably refused to leave the track having suffered the same fate, both athletes moved less than 0.1 s after the gun had fired, with Powell's reactions being timed at 0.086 s. Six days later Powell was added to the 4 × 100 m relay team for the semi-final, running as the anchor. He helped the team qualify for the final, recording the second fastest time. Powell never had a chance to run for a medal in the final as the second baton exchange was not executed cleanly and the Jamaican team failed to finish. During the 2003 season, Powell won two IAAF Grand Prix events, one of which was an AF Golden League event. He finished seventh in 10.23 s in the 100 m at the IAAF World Athletics Final.

In 2004 on 12 June, Powell recorded his first sub-10 100 m race time (9.99 s +1.8 m/s) while participating in the National Junior Track and Field Championships, held at the GC Foster College in Spanish Town. Two weeks later Powell became one of the favourites for a medal in the 100 m at the 2004 Athens Olympics after winning the Jamaican National Championships with a personal best time of 9.91 s. Although he ended the season with a record-equaling nine sub-10 second runs, Powell finished just fifth in the highly competitive Olympic final, with a time of 9.94 s. Following this he pulled out of the 200 m final, even though he had already qualified eighth for it earlier on. Powell did not get the chance to run for a medal in the 4 × 100 m relay, as the Jamaican team failed to qualify for the final with a season best 38.71 s fourth-place finish in their heat. Following his Olympic disappointment Powell set a new national record of 9.87 s for the 100 m at the Memorial Van Damme in Bruxelles on 3 September. He recorded five IAAF Grand Prix wins in 2004. In addition, he became the first man to win both the 100 m and 200 m races at the World Athletics Final in championship record time. Powell was world ranked number one for the 100 m and number four for the 200 m at the end of the season.

A year later Powell set a new national record of 9.84 s at the Jamaica International Invitational in May. He gained some consolation for his Olympic performance by breaking the 100 m world record in Athens on 14 June 2005, setting a time of 9.77 s, beating American Tim Montgomery's 2002 record of 9.78 s (which was later annulled due to doping charges against Montgomery) by just 0.01 s. Coincidentally, Powell achieved the feat on the same track as Maurice Greene's 1999 world record run of 9.79 s. Wind assistance for Powell was measured at 1.6 m/s, within the IAAF legal limit of 2.0 m/s. Powell again won the 100 m final at the Jamaican National Championships. A groin injury in July cut short his season and forced him to miss the World Championships. His season ended with just two IAAF Grand Prix event wins. Despite his shortened season, Powell had the three fastest 100 m times of the year, received the Caribbean And Central American (CAC) Male Athlete of the Year award, and ranked second in the world.

=== 2006–2007: Worldwide success ===
2006 was Powell's most successful season. He won the 2006 Commonwealth Games 100 metres race after a drama-filled semi-final which saw two disqualifications and three false starts. Powell himself ran into another competitor's lane while looking at the scoreboard; however, he was held not to have impeded the runner. He also anchored the 4 × 100 m relay team, and finished the Commonwealth Games with two gold medals. In May, he won the 100 m at the Jamaica International Invitational in 9.95 s. In addition to winning the 200 m at the Jamaican National Championships in June, he won ten 100 m IAAF Grand Prix events, including all six Golden League events.

Powell then equalled his world record time on 11 June 2006 at Gateshead International Stadium with wind assistance measured at +1.5 m/s. The exact time was 9.7629 s, which was rounded up to 9.77 s as per IAAF rules. On 18 August 2006 in Zürich, Powell equalled it again for the second time with wind assistance at +1.0 m/s. He won his sixth IAAF Golden League event (for the 100 m) in the same season, thus earning him a total of $250,000 in prize money. Powell also won the 100 m at the World Athletics Final, again setting a new championship record on 9 September. One week later at the World Cup in Athletics, the Americas team anchored by Powell recorded a DNF. In October, Powell again received the Caribbean And Central American (CAC) Male Athlete of the Year award. On 12 November 2006, he was awarded the title of 2006 Male IAAF World Athlete of the Year along with a cheque for $100,000. He also received the honour of Track & Field Athlete of the Year for 2006.

On 5 January 2007, Powell received the Commonwealth Games Sports Foundation Athlete of the Year award. On 3 February he was honoured at the International Sports Group (ISG) Awards Banquet, held in New York. In addition, Powell was nominated for the Laureus World Sports Awards Sportsman of the Year award. Suffering from knee Tendinitis and missing weeks of training Powell missed competing at the Penn Relays and the Jamaica International Invitational in May. Powell was again the Jamaican National Champion for the 100 m. Unfortunately, Powell again injured his groin while running the final at the Jamaica Championships. He only managed to finish third in the 100 m final at the 2007 World Championships in Osaka, Japan, behind Tyson Gay, who was considered Powell's biggest rival building up to the Championships. Derrick Atkins, Powell's second cousin, came second in 9.91 s. Powell himself finished in a time of 9.96 s (running in a 0.5 m/s headwind) after being passed by Gay and Derrick Atkins in the late stages of the race. Later, Powell admitted that he panicked and gave up after seeing Gay pass him, allowing Atkins also to overtake.

When Tyson came on and gave me a little bit of pressure I just panicked. When I saw I wasn't in gold medal contention, I gave up in the middle of the race. I just stopped running.

American former sprinter Michael Johnson was critical of Powell's performance, stating:

You could see him thinking, I'm losing it, I'm losing it, and he just gave up at that point. That's what was really disappointing. He just dropped his head.

However, Powell did help to win the silver medal in the 4 × 100 m relay race. Running the anchor leg for the Jamaican team, he came from fifth and passed Great Britain at the line to help record a Jamaican national record of 37.89 s. The United States meanwhile took gold.

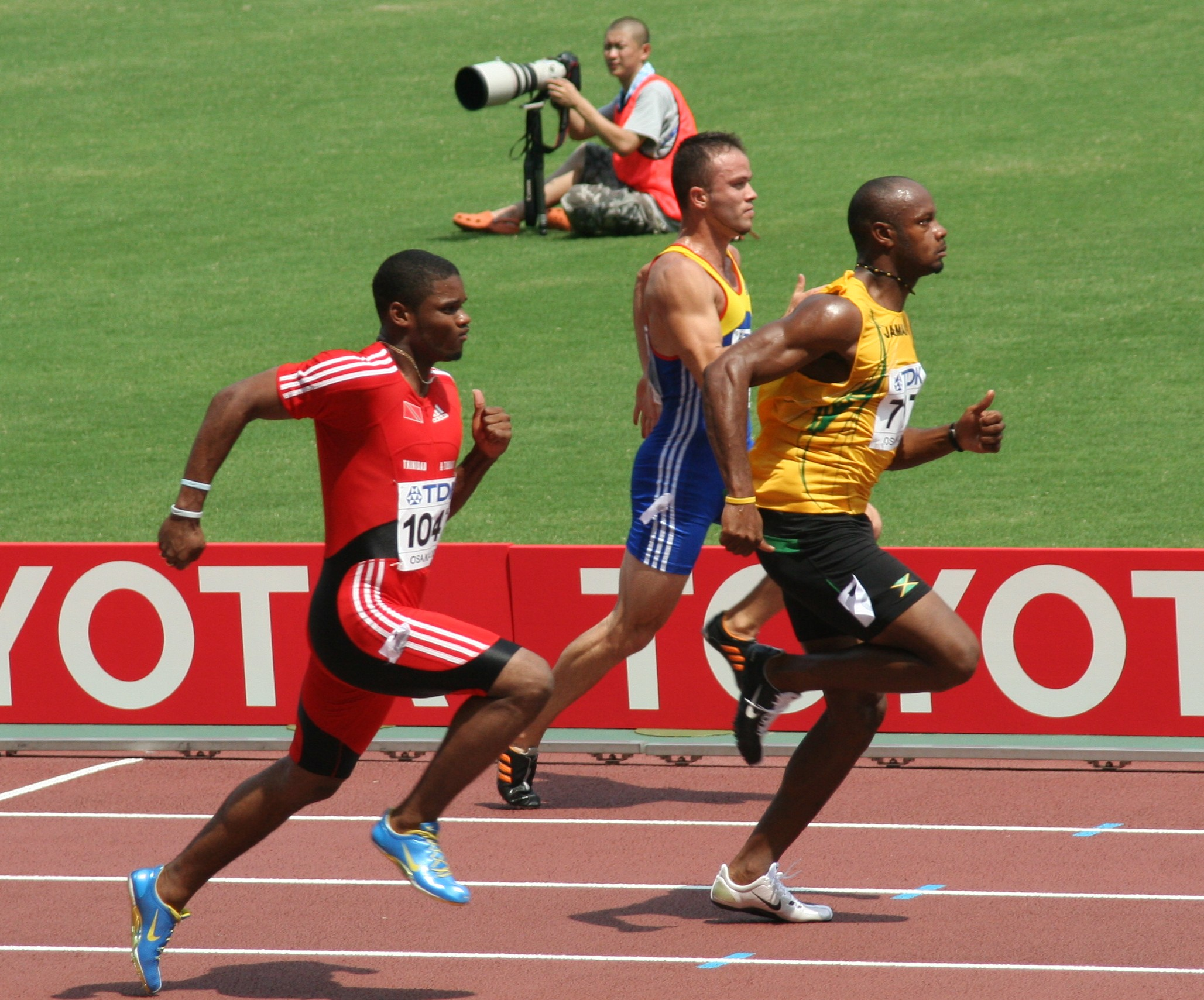
Powell leading a heat at the 2007 World Championships in Osaka, Japan.

On 9 September 2007, in the opening heats of the IAAF Grand Prix in Rieti, Italy, Powell ran a new world record time of 9.74 s (+1.7 m/s) in the 100 m, thus fulfilling the promise he had made earlier after his bronze medal in Osaka, that he would break the record by the end of the year. This was intended to make up for the disappointment of not becoming World Champion. Remarkably, Powell eased up in the final few metres of his record-setting run, indicating that he was saving his strength for the final. In the final itself, Powell finished in 9.78 s (0 m/s windspeed) and bettered his semi-final time when adjusted for wind assistance.

Powell ended his season on 30 September with a left hamstring injury, which came about while running in the lead of the 200 m race at the Super Track & Field meet in Yokohama, Japan. Powell finished 2007 with a total of five IAAF Grand Prix event wins, plus his second consecutive World Athletic Final 100 m win, with yet another championship record. For the third consecutive year Powell won the Caribbean And Central American (CAC) Male Athlete of the Year award. Powell closed the year receiving the IAAF Performance of the Year award, for his 9.74 s world record, and was ranked second in the world.

=== 2008–2009: Olympics and World Championships ===
On 29 January 2008, Powell received the RJR Sports Foundation's 2007 Sportsman of the Year award. Powell's 2008 season started much as his 2007 season ended: with another injury. Powell was forced to pull out of the Sydney Grand Prix meeting, having suffered a gash to his left knee that required four stitches. The injury was a result of tripping on the steps of his home, hours before getting on the flight to Sydney on 12 February.

Powell was again injured in April, this time with damage to his pectoral muscles. The injury forced Powell out of competition for two months, and was sustained while weight training in Jamaica during mid-April. Surgery was required, and a visible scar was left on his right underarm.

On 31 May, fellow Jamaican Usain Bolt ran a time of 9.72 s at the Reebok Grand Prix in New York, breaking Powell's 3-year dominance of the 100 m world record.

On 11 July, Powell suffered his third injury of 2008 while leading in Heat 1 of the Golden Gala Roma, eventually finishing fifth. He had injured his groin (described as a "strain" and a "cramp"), and was forced to miss the next two events on the Grand Prix schedule. Powell made his comeback at the DN Galan meet, where he beat the new World Record holder Bolt, in a close race. The meet's top performers were a Jamaican 1–2–3–4 with Nesta Carter and Michael Frater following the pair. This top four would later combine to run the 4 × 100 m relay at the Olympics.

Prior to the 2008 Olympics in Beijing, Powell hit back at the claims saying he lacked the mental strength needed to win an Olympic gold medal.

It [the Olympics] doesn't scare me. The guys that I'm running against in Beijing are the same ones I run against all year, it's no different at the Olympics – it's just a name, and you should put that aside until you cross the line.

If all you guys look back and check from before, you'll see that Athens was my first Olympics, I ran my personal best in the final – so I'm not sure why people say I don't run my best in finals.

The World Championships was the only final where I didn't do as expected. I made a once-in-a-lifetime mistake and it won't happen again.

I'm running against myself – I'm the only one who can defeat myself and I don't intend to.

Despite his words, the 100 m final saw Powell again finish in a disappointing fifth, recording a time of 9.95 s. Teammates Bolt and Michael Frater also raced in the final. Bolt won and broke the record he set months earlier (finishing in 9.69 s) and Frater came sixth, recording his first sub-10 clocking at 9.97 s.

Seven days later, Powell finally got his first Olympic medal as he anchored the Jamaican 4 × 100 m relay team to victory, helping establish a new world record in the process. His split time was recorded at 8.70 s (USATF High Performance Registered Split Analysis), bettering his previous record of 8.84 s set in Osaka, 2007. This is the fastest electronically timed anchor run in history, as Bob Hayes was hand timed as running between 8.6 and 8.9 seconds in the 1964 Olympics. The gold medal was later vacated by the IOC in 2017 when a retest of teammate Nesta Carter found the presence of the prohibited substance methylhexaneamine.

On 2 September 2008, Powell ran a new personal best of 9.72 s in the 100 m with windspeed measured at +0.2 m/s. He accomplished this feat at the Athletissima Grand Prix in Lausanne, Switzerland. After the run, he said that Bolt's record performance at the Olympics had inspired him to target a time of 9.59 s:

Two years ago, I said to myself I could go 9.65 s or faster, but based on how Bolt is running, it's my aim now to go below 9.60 s. Bolt can obviously run very fast, but I'm not going to put him out of my reach. I'd say in the Olympic 100 m, it looked like Bolt could have run 9.63 s, 9.65 s maybe. I was shocked to see what he did in the race; it was ridiculous. I can't imagine the times he's capable of running at the moment. He's the man to beat right now but before it was me and if I can break another world record then I'll be the one back in the spotlight.

Powell was optimistic about his future chances on the track, and philosophical as to why he could not peak in past major championships:

The 2012 London Games will be my last opportunity and Beijing was certainly my best chance but you never give up.

I've got no idea why I'm always winning on the circuit but then finishing fifth at the Olympics. Maybe if it was just a one-off race without the qualifying rounds I would have done better.

Who knows? Maybe I'm not the guy for those big championships but just the guy to compete in the Grand Prix and Golden League meetings. It's just unfortunate.

Following his fifth-place finish in Beijing on 16 August, Powell recorded seven consecutive 100 m races under 9.90 s, including two races under 9.80 s. In addition, 2008 was Powell's second-best season on the Grand Prix circuit, claiming seven victories, plus his third consecutive win (and fourth overall) in the 100 m at the World Athletics Final.

On his return to Jamaica, Powell was honoured in a homecoming celebration and received an Order of Distinction (Commander Rank) in recognition of his achievements at the Olympics. For the second consecutive year Powell ranked second in the world.

Powell opened his 2009 season on 31 January at the Grace Jackson Invitational, held at Stadium East, Kingston, Jamaica. He ran the 400 metres, winning his heat in 47.75 s, placing him second overall in the four heat time-final.

Powell ran the anchor leg for two relay teams at the Milo Western Relays held at the GC Foster College on 14 February. In his first race, his MVP team recorded a new meet record and world leading time of 38.72 s for the 4 × 100 m relay. Later, he was timed at 46.27 s for his leg of the 4 × 400 metres relay, again winning the race for his MVP team.

Powell next competed at the Sydney Track Classic in Australia on 28 February, again running the anchor leg in the 4 x 100 m relay and winning it in a new world leading time of 38.62 s. Two hours later, he ran a 400 m race, finishing 4th in a new personal best 45.94 s and shaving 1.23 s off his previous best time.

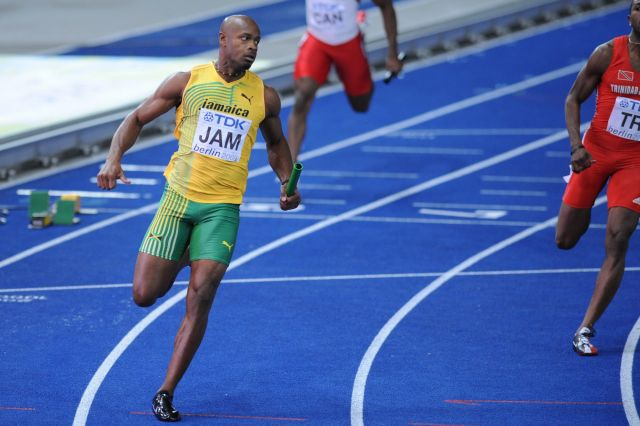
Powell anchoring the Jamaican relay team to a World Championship gold medal

After the 400 m race, Powell said:

My coach said cruise for the first 200 m and bring it home. This tells me I'm a lot stronger this year and it will be a different ball game. I'm just motivated, the 400 m didn't hurt as much as I thought it would. I'm OK. I don't need the ambulance.

Five days later, Powell ran his first 100 m race of the season. Competing at the Melbourne Track Classic he ran a world leading 10.23 s, wind measuring −1.4 m/s on the coldest day of the year to date.

On 16 April, Powell was nominated for the Laureus World Team of the Year award, as a member of the 2008 Jamaica Olympic Sprint Team.

Powell then found himself involved in controversy when he was a last-minute "no show" at the UTech Track and Field Classic on 18 April. He had previously been advertised to run the 200 m and 4 × 100 m relay races. Powell attended as a spectator. A press conference called three days later by the MVP Track Club did not fully answer questions as to why Powell did not compete. The matter was reported to the Jamaica Fair Trading Commission which started investigations on 23 April.

Powell was next to run at the Penn Relays on 25 April, but on the morning of the event, the Jamaica Observer reported that he had withdrawn from the 4 × 100 m relay. His manager Paul Doyle stated that Powell would not run due to concerns with his ankle while running the curve on the Franklin Field track. The Jamaica Observer cited a "highly placed source" when reporting that Powell had turned his ankle in training at Utech. Despite the report, Powell ran the anchor leg of the relay but aggravated the ankle injury, pulled up and finished ninth in 41.24 s.

Scheduled to run at the IAAF Super Grand Prix in Doha on 8 May, Powell withdrew from the event, citing the need for sufficient time for his injured ankle to properly heal. He finished seventh in his first event returning from injury, the Reebok Grand Prix held in New York at Icahn Stadium on 30 May. When interviewed he stated that his ankle was very weak but not painful. He finished second in his next event, the Prefontaine Classic eight days later. On 27 June, he qualified for the 100 m at the 2009 World Championships in Athletics with a second-place finish in 9.97 s at the Jamaican national championships. At the Bislett Games on 3 July, Powell overcame a poor start to win the 100 m in a 10.07 s photo finish. Four days later he recorded the same time in winning the Athletissima 100 m. Although he improved his season's best to 9.88 s, he finished second to Tyson Gay at the Golden Gala Roma on 10 July. Powell next ran the 100 m at the International Meeting of Athletics' Sports Solidarity, a charity event that encourages the participation of disabled athletes, finishing third.

At the 2009 World Championships in Athletics, Powell took bronze in the finals of the 100 m meet with a time of 9.84 seconds, while compatriot Bolt broke his own world record by running 9.58 seconds. Eight days later, on 22 August, Powell helped Jamaica claim gold in the 4 × 100 m relay by running the anchor leg. The time of 37.31 seconds set was a new Championship Record for the event.

=== 2010–2011 ===
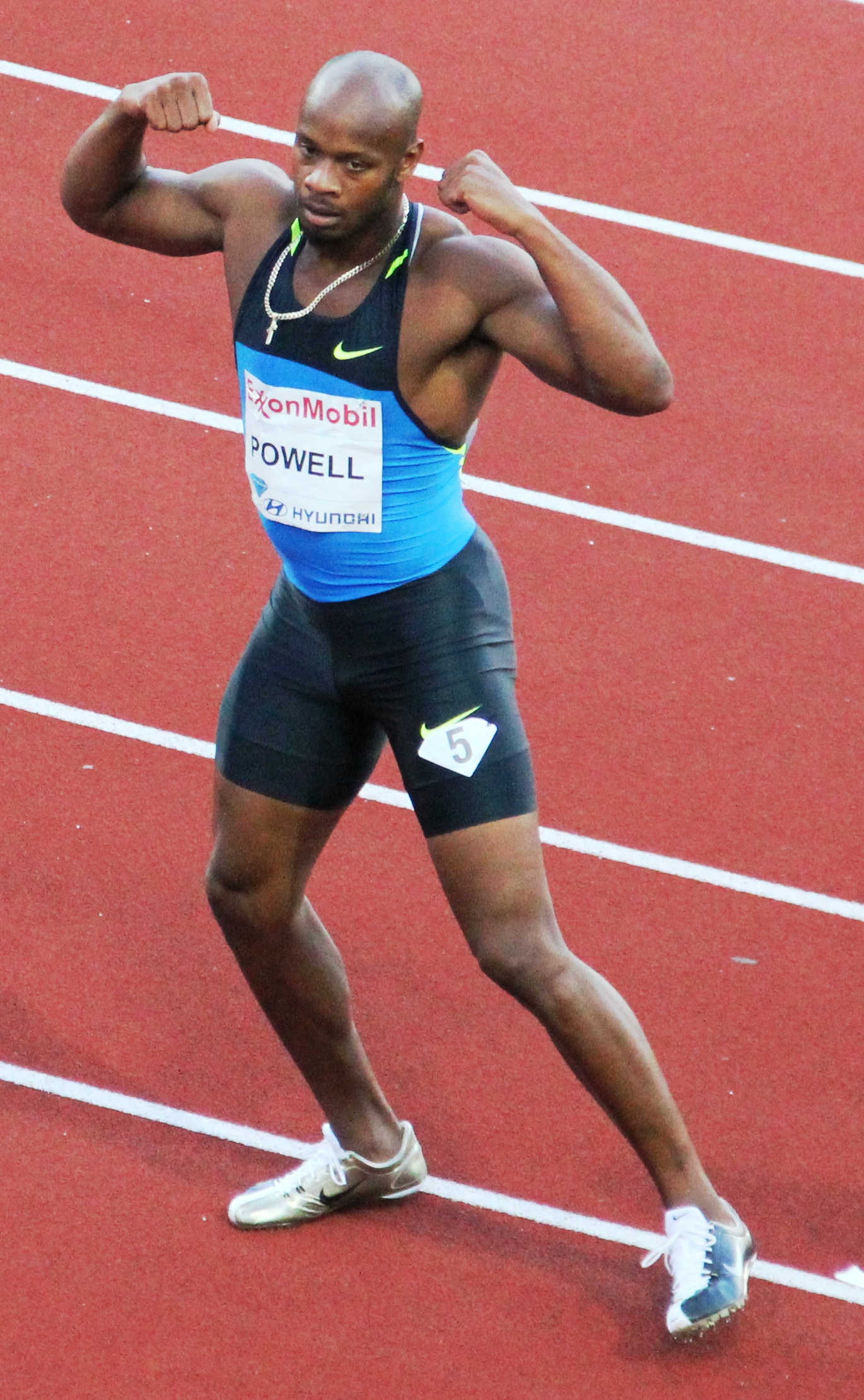
Powell plays to the crowd at the 2010 Bislett Games

Asafa Powell opened his 2010 season on 20 February at the UWI Invitational Meet in Jamaica by competing in the 400 m. He won his heat in a time of 47.56 s but was placed 3rd overall according to his time. He then ran the 200 m at the UTech Classic on 17 April 2010, also in his homeland. He competed in the 200 m in heavy rain and cold conditions. Powell opened up a huge lead in the first 100 m, after which he slowed drastically and won his heat in 21.27 s in a 1 m/s headwind. Later, it was reported that Powell had suffered minor cramps on his left calf muscles, which was why he had to slow down. Powell was next scheduled to run in the highly anticipated 4 × 100 m Penn Relays featuring Jamaica Yellow, and competing against Usain Bolt (Jamaica Black). However, he pulled out of the race as it was reported by his assistant coach that he had an injured toe, which would need some time to heal. At the IAAF Diamond League in Doha, Powell made a wind aided time of 9.75 s in the heat and 9.81 s in the final, also wind-aided. He subsequently set a 100 m world leading time of 9.83 s. En route to this performance, he also set the rarely run 100 yards dash world best at 9.07 s, beating the previous record of 9.21 s set by Charlie Greene.

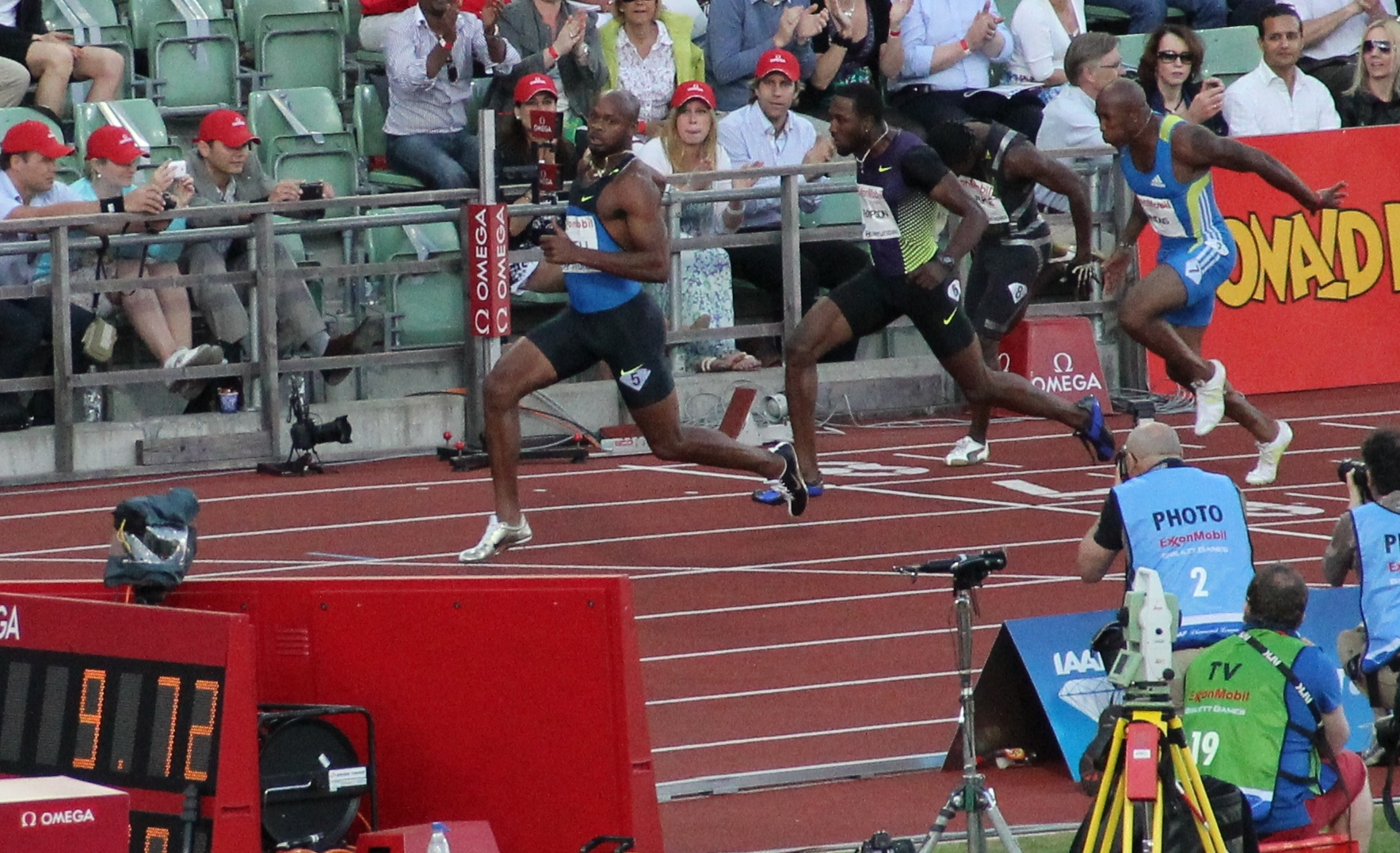
Powell with a wind-aided 9.72s win at the 2010 Bislett Games

Powell next competed at the DKF Bislett Games in Oslo, Norway, where he powered to a splendid victory with a wind-aided 9.72 s. A week later, he competed at the Golden Gala in Rome, Italy, where he overcame a very poor reaction time at the start to take another victory in a World Leading time of 9.82 s. It was reported that Powell ended his six-year contract with leading sports brand Nike due to sponsorship problems, and rumours spread that he has a new contract with fast upcoming Chinese sports brand Li-Ning. Asafa next competed in the 200 m of the Jamaican Senior Trials where he won the final in 19.97 s, his second fastest ever. There, for the first time, he promoted his new Li Ning outfit. Powell next competed in Gateshead where he got off to a terrific start but lost to fast finishing Tyson Gay, who took the victory in 9.94 s to Powell's 9.96 s in a strong 1.7 m/s headwind. Powell was not very disappointed as he mentioned that he got too relaxed, thus allowing Gay to outdo him in the final strides. The next race in Paris against Usain Bolt was a disappointing one. Although he had a good start, Bolt caught him at halfway point, and Asafa began to lose his fluent running form. He finished 2nd to Bolt in 9.91 s, 0.07 s slower than his rival and also into a slight headwind. Asafa said that he had a very bad race, which he hoped to improve in his upcoming races. Unfortunately for Powell, there was not a 'next race' for him. He picked up strains from his Paris meeting, which aggravated to hamstring and back problems. Powell missed his next two outings where he was scheduled to clash against Bolt and Gay. Powell ended his splendid 2010 season on a disappointing note, even though he expressed satisfaction on the races that he competed for the year.

Asafa opened his 2011 season on 16 April at the National Stadium in Kingston, Jamaica. He ran the 200 m where he came in third after what looked to be a good first 140 m, slowing down significantly at the last quarter of the race. His time was 20.55 s for the race behind Yohan Blake and Daniel Bailey. Powell ran his next race was the 4 × 100 m relay, USA vs The World, at the Penn Relays 2011, on 28 April. He ran the unusual first leg for Jamaica as he blasted off like a bullet to give Jamaica the lead. Jamaica won the event in a world leading time of 38.33 s, ahead of USA Red and USA Blue teams respectively. He stated after the run that he was in good shape, and looking forward to do great things in the year ahead. Powell next ran the 200 m at the Jamaica International Invitational Meet on 7 May. He looked promising in the first 120 m, after which he slowed down drastically, finishing in last place with a time of 21.40 s, in a race won by Jamaican Nickel Ashmeade. He later stated that he felt a minor pain in his hamstring, and backed off as a precaution, but insisted that it was nothing serious.

In the second meeting of the 2011 IAAF Diamond League at Shanghai Golden Grand Prix, Powell won the 100 m with a time of 9.95 seconds. Powell next ran at the IAAF Diamond League in Rome against Usain Bolt on 26 May. Powell had a superb start and mid, but he faded towards the end, only to allow the world record holder to surpass him in the final 10–12 m of the race. Bolt won in 9.91 s, and Powell came second in 9.93s. He said that he had lost focus, but is confident about beating Bolt after what he had done that day. Powell next competed in the IAAF World Challenge in Rabat, Morocco, in a low key meet. There, after running the first 20 m, he pulled up and finished last in 36.13 s, citing a precaution against a serious hamstring injury. Reports said that it was nothing serious, and he would be ready for the Jamaican Trials later in the month. At the Jamaican Trials 23–24 July, Powell looked impressive as he qualified through the rounds. He posted a season best of 9.90s in his semi-final, despite easing off in the final 1 5m. Later, after overcoming a bad start, Powell won the final to be titled National Champion for the fifth time in his career. He won in a time of 10.08 s into a 1.8 m/s headwind. Yohan Blake and Steve Mullings were second and third respectively with only 0.01 s separating them.

Next up for Powell was the Diamond League Athletissima in Lausanne on 30 June. In chilly conditions not ideal for sprinting, the former world record holder bulleted out of his blocks and ran to the tape, recording a world-leading 9.78 s with a following wind of 1.0 m/s. Powell was indeed happy with his strong performance, his fastest in three years, and full of confidence about the rest of the season and IAAF World Championships in Daegu, South Korea in late August. Next up for Powell was the IAAF Diamond League Meeting in Birmingham, England on 10 July. He became the first man in history to break the 10 seconds barrier in the Sir Alexander Stadium when he clocked a very easy looking 9.95 s in his heat. Later, in the final, he eased to a 9.91 s victory where compatriots Nesta Carter and Michael Frater finished second and third respectively. Powell was satisfied with both his races, stating that he took both the races easy due to very chilly and rainy conditions. Asafa seemed more and more confident heading into the World Championships in late August. Powell next competed on 30 July in Budapest at the Hungarian Grand Prix. He ran 9.90 s in his heats and eased through the final to win in 9.86 s, having followed winds of 1.8 m/s and 2.0 m/s respectively, in cold conditions.

Powell was next slated to run the Aviva London Grand Prix, but he pulled out, citing a groin strain. Later in late August, just a couple of days before the start of the World Championships in Daegu, Powell shocked the world by pulling out of the highly anticipated 100 m as his groin strain was re-aggravated and did not allow him to compete. Powell expressed great disappointment but vowed to come back strong for the London Olympics in 2012, but still hoped to run the 4x100 m relay in Daegu. However, he was unfit to run the relay and had to watch his compatriots win gold in a world record time of 37.04 s. Powell competed in the 100 m at the Diamond League Final in Zürich on 9 September. He looked very impressive in the first 60 m, but faded to second place as newly crowned world champion, Yohan Blake, took victory in 9.82 s. Powell registered a 9.95 s run, which was impressive given the fact that his injury was still present. By completing the race, the sprinter took the Samsung Diamond Trophy with $40,000 in cash. Powell ended his season with another injury, almost a repeat of year 2010, where he showed excellent form in the first half of the year but unfortunately suffered injuries.

=== 2012 London Olympics ===
In a ceremony held on 24 February, Powell received the University of Technology (UTech) Chancellor's Medal as well as Diana, Princess of Wales Memorial Award International Ambassador role. He ran a personal best for the 60 metres at the Birmingham Indoor Grand Prix, setting a time of 6.50 seconds. On the 2012 IAAF Diamond League circuit, he was narrowly beaten by Justin Gatlin in Doha (runner-up in 9.88 seconds), then won the 100 m at the Shanghai Golden Grand Prix a week later.

On 5 August 2012, Asafa Powell ran in the final of the 100 m race at the 2012 Summer Olympics in London, United Kingdom. After back-to-back 5th-place finishes in Athens and Beijing, 2004 and 2008 respectively, Powell had his most disastrous final yet when he finished in last place with a time of 11.99 seconds, pulling up after seeing others pulling ahead of him, but it was ultimately due to a persistent groin injury. Powell said:

"It was my old groin injury that reoccurred. I felt it and it started to go. You never want to get injured, but it is a bit of a disaster when it happens in the Olympic final."

Usain Bolt took the gold with Yohan Blake getting the silver and Justin Gatlin the bronze. As a result, Powell along with longtime rival Tyson Gay who finished 4th, remain as two of the three fastest men of all time to never have won any individual Olympic medals of any type.

After the race, Jamaica's track and field manager Ludlow Watts lavished praise on Powell:

Powell actually started this great change in our sprinting, and he's still a champion.

Following the race, Powell had an ultrasound showing new tears in his adductor muscles as well as scar tissue in a previous injury. The groin injury appears to be season-ending as manager Paul Doyle believes he will miss the remainder of the year. "I don't think it looks good for the rest of the season for Asafa," he lamented. Powell was not able to compete for Jamaica in the men's 4 × 100 m relay on 10 August.

Powell released an apparel and accessories line branded "Sub 10 King" and many others, also opening up his personal website www.iamasafa.com for people's viewing and a platform to purchase his products.

==== 2013–2014 suspension and appeal ====
On 14 July 2013 Powell announced he had tested positive for the banned drug oxilofrine in 2013 and withdrew from the 2013 World Athletics Championships as a result, but maintained that he did not take any banned supplements knowingly or willfully. Powell and fellow Jamaican sprinter, Sherone Simpson had taken the supplement Epiphany D1 as part of their training regimen, not knowing it contained oxilofrine. It was later revealed that Acacia was substituted with oxilofrine, and not revealed by the manufacturer. The duo sued the company that sold the supplement, Dynamic Life Nutrition (DLN), in order to clear their names. Both Powell and Simpson reached an out of court settlement for an undisclosed amount in September 2015. After the settlement, Simpson released a statement stating: "Both Asafa and I are happy that we were able to settle this out of court." In April 2014, the Jamaica Anti-Doping Commission suspended him for 18 months over doping charges, expiring in December that year. However, after he and Simpson appealed to the Court of Arbitration for Sport (CAS), the suspensions were reduced to the 6 months already served as CAS accepted the explanation that the offense was minor and due to contamination of the Epiphany D1 supplement.

Powell won a lawsuit against the supplement company for failing to disclose the banned stimulant.

=== 2015 World Athletics Championships ===
During his 2015 season, Powell made another appearance at a major championship in the 2015 World Championships in Athletics in Beijing, China. He advanced through the heats and semifinals, running 9.95 and 9.97 respectively. In the final, however, he clocked a time of 10.00 seconds, ultimately finishing in seventh place.

=== 2016 Rio Olympics ===
On 19 August 2016, Powell made a triumphant Olympic return, competing as part of the Jamaican 4 × 100 m men's relay team and winning a gold medal. After Jamaican team gold medal in 2008 Olympics were stripped, this medal win will be his only gold medal at Olympic Games.

=== Physiology and running style ===
Despite Powell's size (1.91 m or 6 ft 3 in tall, weighing 93 kilograms or 205 pounds), he has fast initial acceleration. In the Japanese sports Science institute in 2008, Asafa Powell was measured to have a small cross sectional area of his quadriceps tendon stretched with 114 kilograms of pull force, compared to sprinter Nobuharu Asahara's measurement of 59 kilograms, and the average mans as being 43 kilograms. Powell was also noted as having a large Psoas major muscle in the Japanese sports science institute. Coupled with comparatively high stiffness in his ligaments and tendons, his long legs provide a long stride of 2.6 metres with rapid progression between each stride.

== Personal life ==
Powell is deeply religious, citing his mother and father and his strict upbringing as the reason for this.

In 2002, tragedy struck the Powell family when one of Asafa's brothers, Michael Powell, was shot dead in a taxi in New York. This emotional event happened the week of the Jamaica National Trials. In 2003, Asafa lost another brother during the week of the Jamaica National Championships. One year after the death of Michael, Vaughn Powell suffered a heart attack while playing a game of American football. In April 2007, Corey Reid, an uncle of Powell, was stabbed in Waterloo, Ewarton, St. Catherine. He later died in hospital.

Powell married Ghanaian-born Canadian model Alyshia Powell in 2019. Powell has five children—three with his wife, Amieke Powell, Azhaf Powell, Azim Powell and two from previous relationships, Avani Powell and Liam Powell. Former Mercedes Formula 1 junior Alex Powell is his cousin.

He is good friends with compatriot, 100 and 200-metre world record holder Usain Bolt. The two are often seen joking around and do meet off the track.

Powell is an avid car enthusiast.

Powell announced his retirement from Track and Field on 23 November 2022.

== Sponsorship ==
- Powell has been under contract with Nike since 2004, representing them in all his IAAF races, and agreed to appear in various advertising campaigns for the company. Nike designed and built the Zoom Aerofly shoes for him, which were used at the 2008 Beijing Games. However, Powell ended his contract with Nike in mid-2010, and signed up with leading Chinese sports brand Li Ning. He signed with Puma in 2015 and is still a contracted ambassador in retirement.
- GlaxoSmithKline, through its energy drink Lucozade, has sponsored Powell since he first broke the 100 m World Record in 2005. They honoured his Beijing achievements in a small function in October 2008.
- In January 2006, Powell signed as a global brand spokesperson for Nutrilite. Nutrilite products are sold through the Amway corporation. On 14 January 2009 Amway's Team Nutrilite ended the sponsorship agreement with Powell.

== Accomplishments and major competition results ==
=== Personal bests ===
| Event | Time (seconds) | Venue | Date |
|---|---|---|---|
| 60 metres | 6.44 | World Indoor Championships, Portland, Oregon | 18 March 2016 |
| 100 metres | 9.72 | Lausanne, Switzerland | 2 September 2008 |
| 200 metres | 19.90, 19.83w | Kingston, Jamaica | 25 June 2006 |
| 400 metres | 45.94 | Sydney, Australia | 28 February 2009 |

=== Competition record ===
60 metres

| Event | Result | City | Date |
|---|---|---|---|
| 2004 IAAF World Indoor Championships | 5th Semifinal | Budapest | 5 March 2004 |
| 2016 IAAF World Indoor Championships | 2nd Final | Portland, Oregon | 18 March 2016 |

100 metres

| Event | Result (Pos) | City | Date |
|---|---|---|---|
| 2003 IAAF World Athletics Final | 7th Final | Monaco | 13 September 2003 |
| 2004 Olympic Games | 5th Final | Athens | 22 August 2004 |
| 2004 IAAF World Athletics Final | 1st Final | Monaco | 18 September 2004 |
| 2006 Commonwealth Games | 1st Final | Melbourne | 20 March 2006 |
| 2006 IAAF World Athletics Final | 1st Final | Stuttgart | 9 September 2006 |
| 2007 World Championships | 3rd Final | Osaka | 26 August 2007 |
| 2007 IAAF World Athletics Final | 1st Final | Stuttgart | 22 September 2007 |
| 2008 Olympic Games | 5th Final | Beijing | 16 August 2008 |
| 2008 IAAF World Athletics Final | 1st Final | Stuttgart | 13 September 2008 |
| 2009 World Championships | 3rd Final | Berlin | 16 August 2009 |
| 2009 IAAF World Athletics Final | 2nd Final | Thessaloniki | 12 September 2009 |
| 2012 Olympic Games | 8th Final | London | 5 August 2012 |
| 2015 World Championships | 7th Final | Beijing | 23 August 2015 |

200 metres

| Event | Result | City | Date |
|---|---|---|---|
| 2004 Olympic Games | 4th Semifinal (Final DNS) | Athens | 25 August 2004 |
| 2004 IAAF World Athletics Final | 1st Final | Monaco | 20 September 2004 |

4 × 100 metres relay

| Event | Result | City | Date |
|---|---|---|---|
| 2002 Commonwealth Games | 2nd Final | Manchester | 31 July 2002 |
| 2003 World Championships | DQ Final | Saint-Denis | 31 August 2003 |
| 2005 World Championships | 4th Final | Helsinki | 13 August 2005 |
| 2006 Commonwealth Games | 1st Final | Melbourne | 25 March 2006 |
| 2007 World Championships | 2nd Final | Osaka | 1 September 2007 |
| 2008 Olympic Games | DQ Final | Beijing | 22 August 2008 |
| 2009 World Championships | 1st Final | Berlin | 22 August 2009 |
| 2015 World Championships | 1st Final | Beijing | 29 August 2015 |
| 2016 Olympic Games | 1st Final | Rio de Janeiro | 19 August 2016 |

=== Miscellaneous accomplishment ===
Sub-10.0 runs, Season (100 m)

- Powell was the first man to have run legally under 10.00 seconds 15 times in a single season (2008).

IAAF World Athletics Tour wins

Powell has recorded a total of 35 wins in IAAF Grand Prix events, 14 coming in Golden League events and 12 in IAAF Super Grand Prix events.

In the seven-year history of the IAAF World Athletics Final (2003–2009), Powell won the most competitions of any male athlete and took home the most prize money in the male events. In his seven appearances at the competition, he won the 100 m four times and 200 m once, winning US$173,000 in total.

Time progression in the 100 m

| Year | Time | Windspeed | City | Date | |
|---|---|---|---|---|---|
| 2000 | 11.45 | −2.3 | Kingston | 13 March | The progression of Powell's 100 m seasons' best times |
| 2001 | 10.50 | 0.4 | Kingston | 22 June | The progression of Powell's 100 m seasons' best times |
| 2002 | 10.12 | 1.3 | Rovereto | 28 August | The progression of Powell's 100 m seasons' best times |
| 2003 | 10.02 | 0.8 | Brussels | 5 September | The progression of Powell's 100 m seasons' best times |
| 2004 | 9.87 | 0.2 | Brussels | 3 September | The progression of Powell's 100 m seasons' best times |
| 2005 | 9.77 | 1.6 | Athens | 14 June | The progression of Powell's 100 m seasons' best times |
| 2006 | 9.77 | 1.0 | Zürich | 15 August | The progression of Powell's 100 m seasons' best times |
| 2007 | 9.74 | 1.7 | Rieti | 9 September | The progression of Powell's 100 m seasons' best times |
| 2008 | 9.72 | 0.2 | Lausanne | 2 September | The progression of Powell's 100 m seasons' best times |
| 2009 | 9.82 | 1.4 | Szczecin | 15 September | The progression of Powell's 100 m seasons' best times |
| 2010 | 9.82 | 0.6 | Rome | 10 June | The progression of Powell's 100 m seasons' best times |
| 2011 | 9.78 | 1.0 | Lausanne | 30 June | The progression of Powell's 100 m seasons' best times |
| 2012 | 9.85 | 0.6 | Oslo | 7 June | |
| 2013 | 9.88 | 2.0 | Lausanne | 4 July | |
| 2014 | 9.87 | 1.6 | Austin | 23 August | |
| 2015 | 9.81 | 1.3 | Saint-Denis | 4 July | |
| 2016 | 9.92 | 1.9 | Székesfehérvár | 18 July | |

== See also ==
- Athletics in Jamaica
- Jamaica at the Olympics
- Jamaica at the 2006 Commonwealth Games
- World record progression 100 metres men

Records
| Preceded by Maurice Greene | Men's 100 metres World Record Holder; 14 June 2005 – 31 May 2008 | Succeeded by Usain Bolt |
Awards
| Preceded by Kenenisa Bekele | Men's Track & Field Athlete of the Year; 2006 | Succeeded by Tyson Gay |
| Preceded by Liu Xiang | IAAF Performance of the Year; 2007 | Succeeded by Dayron Robles |
| Preceded by Félix Sánchez | CAC Male Athlete of the Year; 2005, 2006 & 2007 | Succeeded by Usain Bolt |
