= Delano Franklyn =

Jamaican politician (died 2023)

Delano Franklyn (c. November 23, 1959 – February 10, 2023) was a Jamaican attorney-at-Law, a Justice of the Peace, and a Notary Public, and one of the founding partners of the law firm Wilson & Franklyn.

In 1998, he was appointed the Chief Advisor to the then Prime Minister of Jamaica, P. J. Patterson. In 1999, he became a Justice of the Peace. In 2000, he was among the distinguished graduates receiving the Millennium Award from the Mico Teachers College. In October 2002, he was appointed a Senator and served as Minister of State in the Ministry of Foreign Affairs and Foreign Trade, with special responsibility for the Jamaican Diaspora and Overseas Communities.

Franklyn authored and edited several books: The Right Move - Corporate Leadership and Governance in Jamaica (2001), A Jamaican Voice in Caribbean and World Politics (2002), The Challenges of Change (2003), We Want Justice - Jamaica and the Caribbean Court of Justice (2005), Michael Manley –The Politics of Equality (2009), Sprinting into History – Jamaica and the 2008 Olympic Games (2009) and The Jamaican Diaspora: Building an Operational Framework (2010).

Spouses - Marcia Hartley (m.1994; div 2001)

Children - Tifanny Pierre, Maya Franklyn

Grandchildren - Ra'sharni Pinto, Ramari Pinto, Cassius Pierre

Tricia Gray (m.2014-2023)

Franklyn died on February 10, 2023, at the age of 63.
