= List of cities and towns in Jamaica =

The following is a list of the most populous settlements in Jamaica.

== Definitions ==
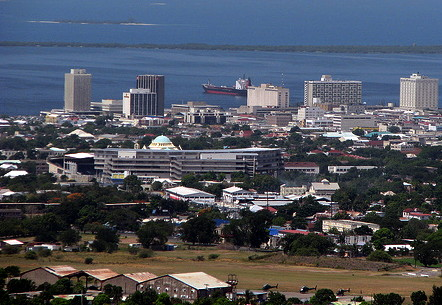
Kingston, capital of Jamaica

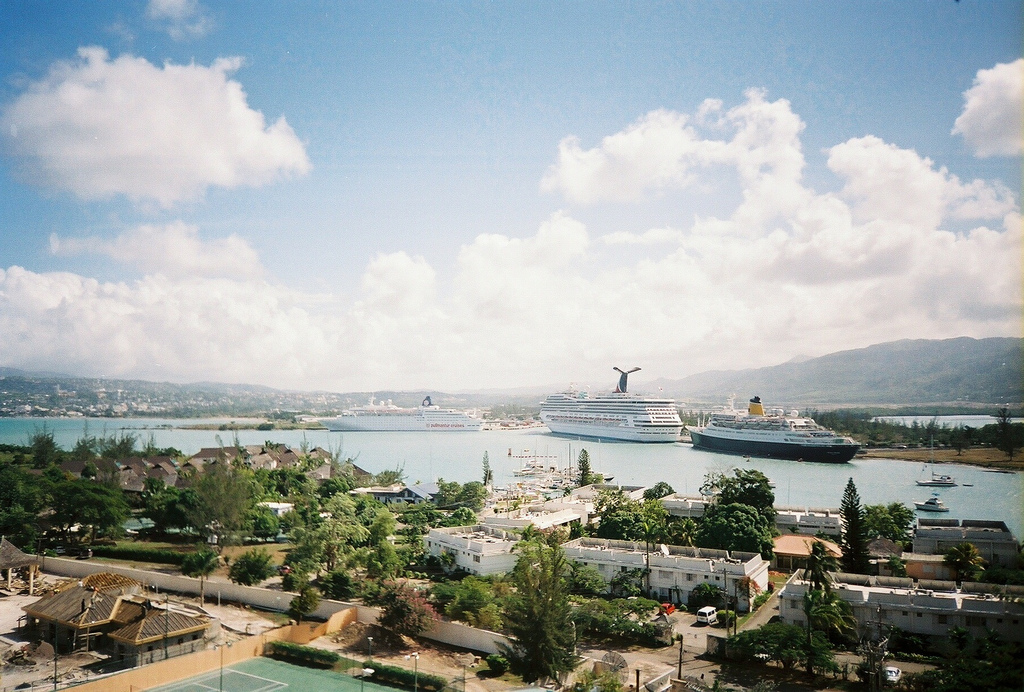
Montego Bay

The following definitions have been used:

- City: Official city status on a settlement is only conferred by Act of Parliament. Only three areas have the designation; Kingston when first incorporated in 1802 reflecting its early importance over the then capital Spanish Town, Montego Bay being granted the status in 1980, and Portmore, whose municipal council was given the city title in 2018. It is not necessarily based on population counts, and while a honorific title, can confer some increased autonomy.
- Town/Village: The Statistical Institute of Jamaica considers an urban area to be any area with 2,000 or more residents. A town would generally be considered to be ranked as a higher populated urban area, and a village as a minor urban area.
- Neighbourhood: Geographically obvious subdivisions of any of the above.

== Cities ==
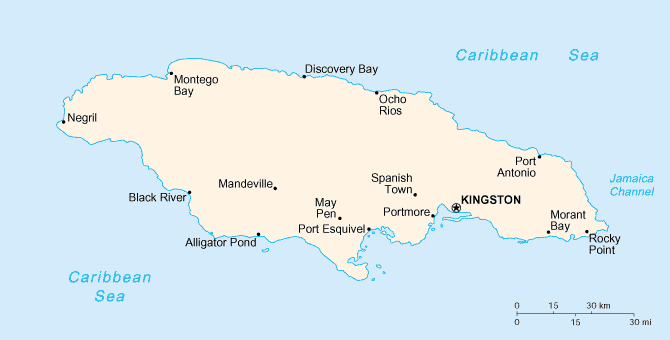
A map of Jamaica, with main settlements and notable places

=== Cities ===
2022 figures awaiting full urban area populations.

Name	Census population			Coordinates	Parish	Granted	Legal basis
Name	2022	2011	2001	Coordinates	Parish	Granted	Legal basis
Kingston**		584,627	579,137	17.98°N 76.80°W	Kingston	1802	An Act for the Constituting a Corporation, for Better Ordering and Managing the Police of the Town and Parish of Kingston..., 1801
Portmore		182,153	156,469	17.94°N 76.87°W	Saint Catherine	2018	Local Governance (Municipality of Portmore) (Change of Name) Order, Resolution, 2018
Montego Bay*		110,115	96,477	18.46°N 77.91°W	Saint James	1980	Montego Bay (Status of City) Act, 1980

** Country and parish capital

* Parish capital

=== Chief Towns ===
These are settled areas with 10,000 residents or more.

Name	Census population			Coordinates	Parish
Name	2022	2011	2001	Coordinates	Parish
Spanish Town*	168,900	147,152	131,515	17.99°N 76.95°W	Saint Catherine
May Pen*	8,016	61,548	57,334	17.97°N 77.24°W	Clarendon
Mandeville*	21,686	49,695	47,467	18.05°N 77.48°W	Manchester
Old Harbour	35,753	28,912	23,823	17.92°N 77.10°W	Saint Catherine
Savanna-la-Mar*	10,884	22,633	19,893	18.16°N 77.95°W	Westmoreland
Ocho Rios	8,587	16,671	15,769	18.42°N 77.11°W	Saint Ann
Linstead	20,693	15,231	15,660	18.15°N 77.02°W	Saint Catherine
Port Antonio*	6,514	14,816	14,568	18.16°N 76.38°W	Portland
Constant Spring	37,370	11,801	12,072	18.05°N 76.78°W	Saint Andrew
Saint Ann's Bay*	6,946	11,173	10,441	18.44°N 77.22°W	Saint Ann
Morant Bay*	1,063	11,052	10,782	17.87°N 76.39°W	Saint Thomas
Yallahs	5,085	10,849	9,888	17.87°N 76.57°W	Saint Thomas
Hayes	11,049	10,639	10,098	17.88°N 77.25°W	Clarendon
Santa Cruz	16,703	10,423	10,785	18.07°N 77.72°W	Saint Elizabeth
Ewarton	10,624	9,753	10,807	18.18°N 77.08°W	Saint Catherine
Bog Walk	13,039	9,431	11,241	18.10°N 77.02°W	Saint Catherine
Brown's Town	14,984	9,031	8,054	18.40°N 77.36°W	Saint Ann
Falmouth*	14,023	8,686	8,188	18.49°N 77.66°W	Trelawny
Runaway Bay	13,160	8,640	5,840	18.45°N 77.33°W	Saint Ann
Lucea*	10,042	7,840	6,245	18.44°N 78.18°W	Hanover
Negril	10,435	7,680	5,679	18.32°N 78.33°W	Westmoreland
Negril		152	184	18.32°N 78.33°W	Hanover
Porus	10,156	6,009	5,924	18.03°N 77.42°W	Manchester
Old Harbour Bay	20,133	5,872	6,344	17.90°N 77.10°W	Saint Catherine
Half Way Tree*	15,370	5,163	4,934	18.01°N 76.78°W	Saint Andrew
Discovery Bay	11,666	2,446	2,518	18.47°N 77.39°W	Saint Ann
Kellits	11,116	2,106	2,422	18.17°N 77.23°W	Clarendon

=== Towns and villages ===
Name	Census population				Coordinates	Parish
Name	2022	2011	2001	1991	Coordinates	Parish
Above Rocks	3,141	3,076	3,170	3,263	18.10°N 76.87°W	Saint Catherine
Aenon Town	2,253	1,374	1,808		18.20°N 77.39°W	Clarendon
Adelphi	2,598	2,218	1,459		18.44°N 77.79°W	Saint James
Albert Town	753	3,845	3,949	3,389	18.29°N 77.54°W	Trelawny
Alexandria	2,344	1,693	1,734	1,672	18.29°N 77.35°W	Saint Ann
Alligator Pond	2,909	2,541	1,883	1,542	17.87°N 77.56°W	Manchester
Alston	2,457	2,049	1,666		18.17°N 77.43°W	Clarendon
Anchovy	3,957	4,414	4,081	3,633	18.40°N 77.93°W	Saint James
Annotto Bay	6,539	6,017	5,423	5,468	18.27°N 76.77°W	Saint Mary
Balaclava	3,501	2,770	2,703	2,837	18.17°N 77.64°W	Saint Elizabeth
Bamboo	8,096	4,705	4,298	3,732	18.38°N 77.26°W	Saint Ann
Bath	1,584	2,115	2,144	2,151	17.95°N 76.35°W	Saint Thomas
Bethel Town	4,638	4,198	3,232	2,768	18.30°N 77.95°W	Westmoreland
Black River*	4,067	5,352	4,095	3,675	18.03°N 77.86°W	Saint Elizabeth
Bluefields	3,822	2,978	3,132	2,564	18.17°N 78.03°W	Westmoreland
Brighton					18.15°N 77.87°W	Saint Elizabeth
Buff Bay	6,946	4,678	4,210	2,596	18.23°N 76.67°W	Portland
Bull Savanna	2,963	3,747	3,457		17.88°N 77.59°W	Saint Elizabeth
Cambridge	3,119	4,073	3,966	3,384	18.32°N 77.89°W	Saint James
Carron Hall	1,717	1,186	1,293		18.27°N 76.94°W	Saint Mary
Cascade	1,044	812	866	1,220	18.40°N 78.10°W	Hanover
Cave Valley	2,296	1,500	1,722	1,777	18.27°N 77.37°W	Saint Ann
Cedar Valley	1,670	1,299	1,592		17.99°N 76.58°W	Saint Thomas
Chapelton	3,616	4,363	4,556	3,930	18.08°N 77.27°W	Clarendon
Christiana	6,669	8,430	8,276	7,235	18.17°N 77.49°W	Manchester
Claremont	4,362	1,773	1,970	2,154	18.38°N 77.17°W	Saint Ann
Clark's Town	3,455	3,003	3,953	3,139	18.42°N 77.57°W	Trelawny
Coleyville	3,678	2,016	2,098	3,320	18.22°N 77.50°W	Manchester
Comfort Castle	1,770	893	856		18.05°N 76.41°W	Portland
Croft's Hill	5,099	3,117	3,202	2,994	18.13°N 77.22°W	Clarendon
Cross Keys	2,895	1,869	2,057		17.89°N 77.50°W	Manchester
Dalvey	2,375	2,952	3,263	2,742	17.90°N 76.25°W	Saint Thomas
Darliston	2,301	2,328	2,529	1,435	18.23°N 77.97°W	Westmoreland
Dias	2,259	1,653	1,434		18.39°N 78.19°W	Hanover
Duncans	3,410	2,686	2,132	1,849	18.47°N 77.53°W	Trelawny
Easington	2,404	2,664	2,326	2,378	17.92°N 76.60°W	Saint Thomas
Frankfield	4,684	3,507	3,625	2,865	18.15°N 77.35°W	Clarendon
Frome	1,329	1,306	968	900	18.30°N 78.15°W	Westmoreland
Gayle	1,452	3,260	4,148	3,205	18.33°N 77.00°W	Saint Mary
Gimme-Me-Bit	2,480	883	1,076		17.89°N 77.28°W	Clarendon
Glengoffe	5,375	3,100	3,232		18.14°N 76.88°W	Saint Catherine
Golden Grove	1,222	2,351	2,622	2,761	17.93°N 76.27°W	Saint Thomas
Gordon Town	2,635	3,265	3,846	1,049	18.05°N 76.70°W	Saint Andrew
Grange Hill	8,278	6,922	7,591	6,530	18.37°N 78.20°W	Westmoreland
Green Island	4,896	1,933	1,539	1,591	18.38°N 78.27°W	Hanover
Guy's Hill	6,017				18.24°N 76.99°W	Saint Catherine
Guy's Hill	691	763	518	3,165	18.25°N 77.00°W	Saint Mary
Hector's River	1,665	1,617	1,578		18.00°N 76.26°W	Portland
Highgate	9,114	6,375	6,051	5,418	18.32°N 76.87°W	Saint Mary
Hope Bay	2,282	1,759	1,774	1,569	18.20°N 76.57°W	Portland
Hopewell	6,865	5,651	4,759	4,268	18.25°N 78.30°W	Hanover
Islington	6,483	3,983	2,973	2,868	18.32°N 76.85°W	Saint Mary
Jackson Town	2,456	2,143	1,718		18.41°N 77.48°W	Trelawny
James Hill	7,986	1,404	1,770		18.18°N 77.34°W	Clarendon
Johns Hall	4,234	3,217	2,329		18.41°N 77.85°W	Saint James
Junction	9,846	4,034	3,524		17.90°N 77.60°W	Saint Elizabeth
Kemps Hill		573	1,132		17.85°N 77.28°W	Clarendon
Lacovia	4,957	3,788	3,125	3,159	18.07°N 77.75°W	Saint Elizabeth
Lionel Town	3,702	3,609	3,568	4,669	17.80°N 77.23°W	Clarendon
Little London	9,310	4,222	4,312	1,848	18.30°N 78.20°W	Westmoreland
Lluidas Vale	7,750	2,095	2,552	2,161	18.12°N 77.15°W	Saint Catherine
Long Bay	2,199	976	1,074		18.09°N 76.31°W	Portland
Lucky Hill	1,859	3,260	4,148	750	18.30°N 77.02°W	Saint Mary
Maggotty	3,121	1,727	1,099	1,359	18.15°N 77.77°W	Saint Elizabeth
Malvern	4,031	2,817	3,056	3,262	17.97°N 77.72°W	Saint Elizabeth
Manchioneal	2,327	2,383	2,316	2,185	18.05°N 76.28°W	Portland
Maroon Town	818	2,673	3,206	2,669	18.35°N 77.79°W	Saint James
Mavis Bank	5,533	2,309	2,432	1,756	18.02°N 76.67°W	Saint Andrew
Mile Gully	1,902	2,004	2,134		18.13°N 77.54°W	Manchester
Milk River	3,431	1,564	842		17.87°N 77.35°W	Clarendon
Mitchell Town	1,683	1,452	1,749		17.80°N 77.19°W	Clarendon
Mocho	553	1,531	1,788		18.02°N 77.32°W	Clarendon
Moneague	3,965	3,464	3,383	2,880	18.28°N 77.10°W	Saint Ann
Moore Town	1,155	1,061	1,317	1,054	18.07°N 76.43°W	Portland
Mountainside	3,175	1,754	1,097		17.98°N 77.74°W	Saint Elizabeth
Nain	3,598	2,969	2,506	2,373	17.97°N 77.60°W	Saint Elizabeth
New Market	2,868	2,204	1,775		18.14°N 77.90°W	Saint Elizabeth
Newell	1,081	2,056	1,836		17.92°N 77.74°W	Saint Elizabeth
Newport	5,220	3,022	2,495		17.96°N 77.50°W	Manchester
Oracabessa	6,885	4,398	4,230	4,066	18.40°N 76.93°W	Saint Mary
Osbourne Store	4,296	3,580	2,954	3,390	17.97°N 77.33°W	Clarendon
Petersfield	3,787	5,037	3,699	2,045	18.25°N 78.07°W	Westmoreland
Point Hill	4,549	2,099	2,235	3,651	18.08°N 77.10°W	Saint Catherine
Port Morant	2,246	2,905	3,007		17.88°N 76.32°W	Saint Thomas
Port Maria*	8,240	7,463	7,439	7,651	18.37°N 76.89°W	Saint Mary
Port Royal	3,144	1,251	1,651	3,004	17.93°N 76.85°W	Kingston
Pratville		1,963	1,351		17.91°N 77.41°W	Manchester
Race Course	4,050	2,958	3,168	2,589	17.83°N 77.28°W	Clarendon
Ramble	3,622	2,047	2,024		18.35°N 77.97°W	Hanover
Retreat	4,895	3,034	2,759		18.39°N 77.02°W	Saint Mary
Richmond	2,285	2,086	2,210	1,984	18.23°N 76.90°W	Saint Mary
Rio Bueno	1,665	1,037	1,275	1,108	18.46°N 77.45°W	Trelawny
Riversdale	2,455	2,514	3,575	2,791	18.15°N 76.97°W	Saint Catherine
Rock River	5,166	1,786	1,831		18.07°N 77.21°W	Clarendon
Rocky Point	2,356	2,473	3,327	2,744	17.77°N 77.27°W	Clarendon
Sandy Bay	7,542	5,052	3,817	4,476	18.45°N 78.10°W	Hanover
Seaforth	5,314	5,287	5,517	4,108	17.93°N 76.45°W	Saint Thomas
Siloah	2,741	2,545	2,755	2,701	18.17°N 77.71°W	Saint Elizabeth
Southfield	6,249	3,854	3,404	2,671	17.88°N 77.67°W	Saint Elizabeth
Spalding	1,374	4,373	3,225	5,481	18.14°N 77.41°W	Manchester
Spalding	4,159	2,147	2,645	5,481	18.14°N 77.41°W	Clarendon
Spur Tree	4,453				17°59′43″N 77°33′35″W	Manchester
Stony Hill	9,447	9,307	9,242	8,244	18.08°N 76.78°W	Saint Andrew
Sturge Town					18.25°N 77.31°W	Saint Ann
Thompson Town	6,807	2,310	2,383		18.08°N 77.36°W	Clarendon
Toll Gate	5,438	2,800	3,087		17.97°N 77.35°W	Clarendon
Trinity Ville	2,298	1,239	2,338	2,614	17.95°N 76.53°W	Saint Thomas
Troja	1,061	1,019	1,394		18.20°N 76.92°W	Saint Catherine
Ulster Spring	1,272	841	995	1,391	18.32°N 77.52°W	Trelawny
Wait-A-Bit	1,678	3,157	3,439		18.24°N 77.52°W	Trelawny
Wakefield	4,434	3,373	3,019	2,724	18.42°N 77.72°W	Trelawny
Watt Town	1,804	434	538		18.30°N 77.41°W	Saint Ann
White House	5,934	4,211	3,498	3,157	18.08°N 77.97°W	Westmoreland
Williamsfield	4,287	3,327	4,251	2,800	18.07°N 77.48°W	Manchester
York Town	3,782	1,623	2,075		17.94°N 77.27°W	Clarendon

== Villages ==
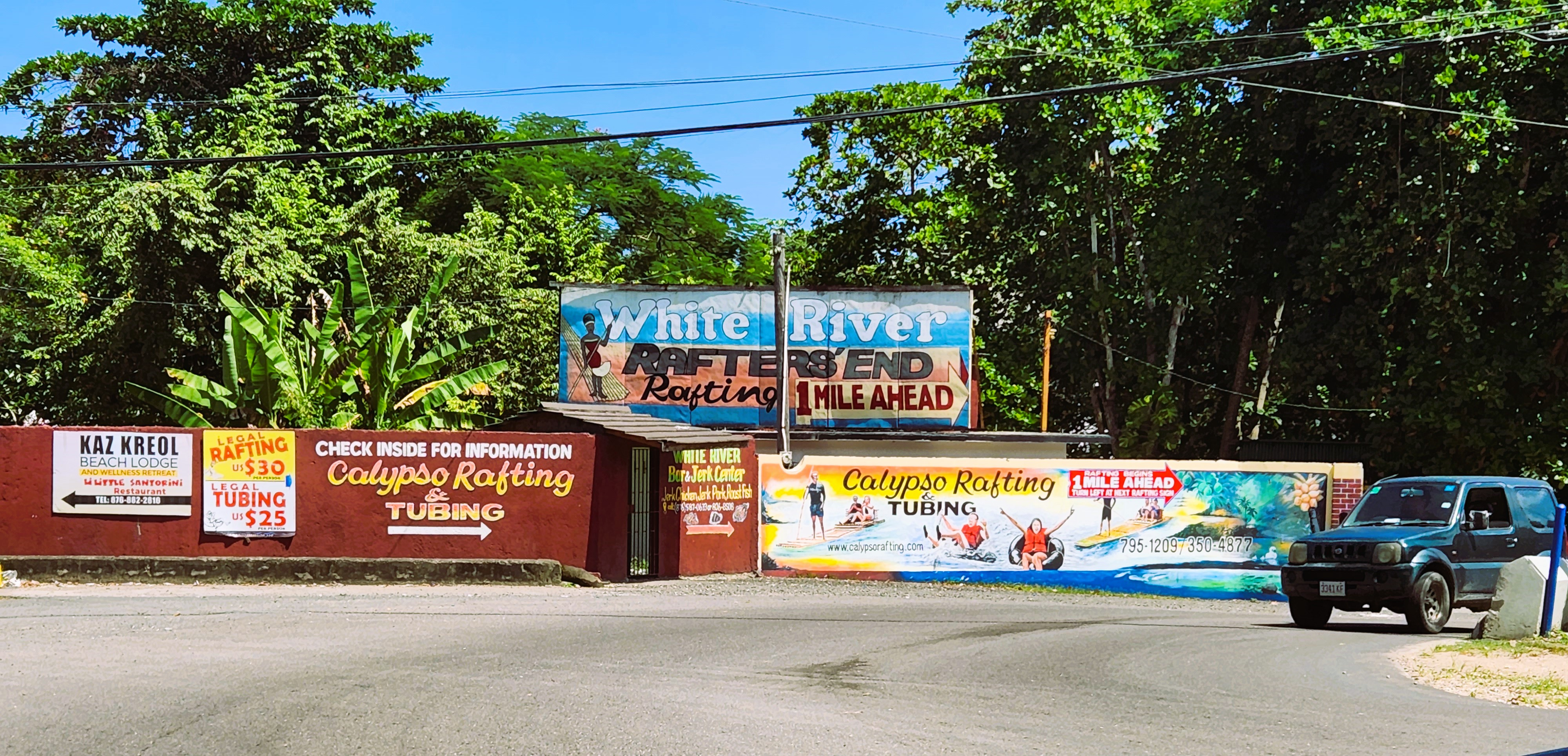
White River Rafting signs

- Accompong (Saint Elizabeth)
- Aeolus Valley (Saint Thomas)
- Airy Castle (Saint Thomas)
- Barking Lodge (Saint Thomas)
- Berry Hill (Manchester)
- Bog (Westmoreland)
- Big Woods (Westmoreland)
- Boscobel (Saint Mary)
- Bull Bay (Saint Andrew)
- Carmel (Westmoreland)
- Cattawood Springs (Portland)
- Clarendon Park (Clarendon)
- Cotterwood (Saint Elizabeth)
- Duckenfield (Saint Thomas)
- Four Paths (Clarendon)
- Haddersfield (Saint Mary)
- Hagley Gap (Saint Thomas)
- Hodges (Saint Elizabeth)
- Hopewell Hall (Saint Thomas)
- Hopewell (Clarendon)
- Hopewell (Manchester)
- Hopewell (Saint Andrew)
- Hopewell (Saint Ann)
- Hopewell (Saint Elizabeth)
- Hopewell (Westmoreland)
- Hopeton (Westmoreland)
- Knockpatrick (Manchester)
- Lloyds (Saint Thomas)
- Long Wood (Saint Elizabeth)
- Mavis Bank (Saint Andrew)
- Meadsfield (Manchester)
- Middle Quarters (Saint Elizabeth)
- Mount Rosser (Saint Catherine)
- Nanny Town (Portland)
- New Holland (Saint Elizabeth)
- New Market (Saint Elizabeth)
- New Roads (Saint Elizabeth)
- Newcastle (Saint Andrew)
- Nine Mile (Saint Ann)
- Old Pera (Saint Thomas)
- Paynes Town (Saint Elizabeth)
- Port Esquivel (Saint Catherine)
- Port Morant (Saint Thomas)
- Roxborough (Manchester)
- San San (Portland)
- Sheckles Pen (Clarendon)
- Stonehenge (Saint James)
- Walderston
- White Hall (Saint Elizabeth)
- Wood Hall (Saint Catherine)

== Neighbourhoods ==
=== Kingston and Saint Andrew Parish ===
- Barbican
- Allerdyce
- Cherry Gardens
- Belgrade Mews
- Smokey Vale
- Constant Spring
- Denham Town
- Tivoli Gardens
- Jones Town
- Kencot
- Allman Town
- Rae Town
- Downtown Kingston
- Red Hills
- Stony Hill
- Mountain View
- Forest Gardens
- Forest Hills
- Forest Hills Gardens
- Duhaney Park
- Patrick City
- Patrick Gardens
- Washington Gardens
- Norbrook
- Queen Hill
- Meadowbrook
- Meadowbrook Estates
- Pembroke Hall
- Half Way Tree
- Eastwood Park Gardens
- Harbour View
- Port Royal
- Liguanea
- Mona
- Ithaca
- Papine
- Kintyre
- Beverly Hills
- Long Mountain
- New Kingston
- Trafalgar Park
- Hope Pastures
- Jack's Hill
- Riva Ridge
- Cross Roads
- Norbrook
- Trenchtown
- Riverton Meadows
- Seaview Gardens
- Callaloo Bed
- New Haven
- Waterhouse
- Backto
- Payne Land
- Olympic Garden
- Cockburn Gardens
- Greenwich Town
- Whitfield Town
- Marverley
- Pembrook Hall
- Zaidie Gardens
- Hughenden
- Havendale
- Molynes Gardens
- Vineyard Town
- Woodford Park
- Franklyn Town
- Eden Gardens
- Bournemouth Gardens
- Norman Gardens
- August Town
- College Common
- Elletson Flats

== See also ==
- Demographics of Jamaica
