= Llandewey =

Settlement in Saint Thomas Parish, Jamaica

Coordinates: 17°57′06″N 76°36′34″W

Llandewey is a settlement along the Yallahs River in Saint Thomas Parish, Jamaica. It is approximately 30 kilometres (19 mi) north of Kingston and 15 kilometres (9.3 mi) northwest of Yallahs.

An earthquake in 1692 caused severe damage to the town.
