= Enid Gonsalves =

- Born: Enid Veronica Watson; 12 April 1931; Lucea, Hanover Parish, Colony of Jamaica, British Empire
- Died: 6 September 2011 (aged 80); Hanover Parish, Jamaica
- Other names: Enid Veronica Watson-Gonsalves, Enid Watson-Gonsalves
- Occupation: educator
- Years active: 1949–1999

Enid Gonsalves, OD (12 April 1931 – 6 September 2011) was a Jamaican teacher and community activist from Hanover Parish, Jamaica. She was recognized throughout her career with many distinctions including the Governor General's Achievement Award and the Prime Minister's Medal for Community Service and Education. In 2008 she was honoured as an officer in the Order of Distinction and the following year, received the Holy See's Medal of Good Merit.

== Early life ==
Enid Veronica Watson was born on 12 April 1931, in Lucea, Hanover Parish, Jamaica to Ludiana (née Clarke) and Cyril Watson. Her father worked as a carpenter and her mother was a teacher. Her father's chronic illness made her mother the breadwinner in the family. To work, Ludiana walked daily 25 miles round trip from home. Completing her primary schooling at Middlesex Corner School, at age 11, Watson passed the entrance examinations for Rusea's High School, earning one of only four scholarships available. After completing her Junior and Senior Cambridge examinations, she graduated in 1949.

== Career ==
Watson began her teaching career, walking as her mother had, to the parish communities of Askenish and Chambers Pen for thirteen months. She then took a teaching post at Lucea Infant School, where she worked until 1953. Having saved sufficient funds, at that time, she entered the Shortwood Teachers' College, in Kingston's Saint Andrew Parish. After graduating with distinction in mathematics and music, in January 1956, Watson married Aubrey Gonsalves. The couple had two children, Reynold and Ann Marie. At the end of the 1950s, she worked briefly at the Shortwood Infant School, but the family soon relocated to Hanover Parish, where she taught at Lucea Primary School.

In 1964, Gonsalves became the principal of the Lucea Infant School and served in that capacity through 1975. Simultaneously, she was active in many community organizations, directing the Hanover Benefit Building Society, serving as secretary to the Hanover Chamber of Commerce and Lucea Teachers' Association, among others. She also was involved in civil service, having been appointed as a Justice of the peace, Gonsalves worked in the Lay Magistrates Association and served as coordinator for music on Jamaica Cultural Development Commission. In 1975, she founded the Hanover Cooperative Credit Union, and became the organization's director, serving in that capacity for over three decades.

That same year, Gonsalves became the principal of the Lucea Primary School. In 1980, she was recognized with the Centenary Medal bestowed by the Institute of Jamaica and in 1993 was awarded both the Governor General's Achievement Award and the Prime Minister's Medal for Community Service and Education. After twenty-two years as principal of Lucea Primary, Gonsalves became the principal of Lucea Preparatory School in 1997. After a year, she became principal of her alma mater Rusea's High School and then in 1999, she retired, but unable to give up teaching entirely, the talented organist, became the music teacher at the Junior Campus of Rusea's High. Gonsalves was honoured as an officer in the Order of Distinction for her work in education and community development in 2008 and the following year presented with the Medal of Good Merit from the Holy See.

== Death and legacy ==
Gonsalves died on 6 September 2011 in Hanover Parish, Jamaica. A "household name" in Hanover, she is remembered for her dedication to education and community development.
