= Duckenfield =

Duckenfield may refer to:

- Byron Duckenfield (1917–2010), English Royal Air Force officer
- David Duckenfield (born 1944), Police Chief Superintendent with a key involvement in the Hillsborough disaster
- Robert Duckenfield (1619–1689), English Parliamentarian commander
- Duckenfield, Jamaica, a settlement
- Duckenfield, New South Wales, a place in Australia
- Duckenfield (ship), three merchant ships

== See also ==
- Dukinfield, a town in England
