= Rusea's High School =

Location
- Watson Taylor Drive; Lucea, Hanover; Jamaica
- 18°27′11″N 78°10′36″W

Information
- Type: Public school (government funded)
- Motto: Labor omnia vincit (Work conquers all)
- Established: 22 December 1777; 248 years ago
- Founder: Martin Rusea (bequest)
- School code: 09044
- Principal: Linvern Wright
- Years offered: 7–13
- Gender: Co-educational
- Age range: 13-19
- Enrolment: 1,823 (2018)
- Student to teacher ratio: 17:1
- Language: English
- Colours: Yellow, blue and green
- Sports: Track and field, Football, Volleyball, Badminton, Table Tennis, Netball, Basketball
- Website: www.ruseashighschool.com

Rusea's High School in Lucea, Hanover, Jamaica, established in 1777, is the fourth oldest, continuously operated high school in Jamaica, after Wolmer's Boys', one of the Wolmer's Schools (1729), Manning's School (1738) and St. Jago High School (1744).

== History ==
The history of the Rusea's High School dates back thirteen years before the actual establishment of the institution when Martin Rusea, a French refugee, as gratitude to the town of Lucea for the kindness shown to him, bequeathed in his will, dated 23 July 1764, to provide for the establishment of a trust school for the children of Hanover. The school was established on 22 December 1777, when the Jamaica Assembly passed an Act (18 Geo. III c. 7), after which the Free School was formally set up.

In the 18th century, these schools originated from their benefactors’ concerns for the education of the country's poor, usually the children of poor whites, as there was no system in place for the education of the children of slaves.

In 1982, Rusea's High School was merged with the Hanover Secondary School. The combined school retained the name Rusea's High School. The traditional colors of the Rusea's high school are yellow, blue and green.

The school consists two campuses: the main campus located on Watson Taylor Drive; and the Fort Charlotte campus on Fort Charlotte Drive.

== Academics ==
In addition to the regular academic curriculum, Rusea's also offers 10 vocational subjects. The sixth-form programme was restarted in 2001 and offers natural science, business studies, the humanities, modern languages and environmental science.

School Profile
Year	Enrollment	Student-Teacher Ratio
2018	1,823	19:1
2017	1,770	18:1
2016	1,838	20:1
2015	1,978	22:1
2014	2,085	25:1
2013	2,173	30:1
2012	2,159	27:1

== Sports ==
Rusea's has won the daCosta Cup high-school football competition 11 times (second only to Cornwall College): 1884, 1985, 1987, 1989, 1990, 1992, 1993, 2002, 2010, 2011, and 2017. The school has also won or shared the Olivier Shield a total of 6 times: 1985, 1989, 1990, 1992, 1993, and 2002.

== Historic buildings ==
Fort Charlotte was built in 1761 by the British for the defence of the north-westerly section Jamaica. It was built during the reign of King George III of Great Britain, and is named after his Queen Consort, Charlotte. Alongside the fort is a Georgian brick structure known as The Barracks, which was built in 1843 to provide shelter to the soldiers stationed there. The barracks currently forms part of the Rusea's High School. The Jamaica National Heritage Trust declared Fort Charlotte a national heritage site in 1993.

== Notable alumni ==
- Dwayne Ambusley, Jamaican international footballer
- Deshane Beckford, Jamaican footballer
- Tamika Davis, member of the Jamaican Parliament
- Enid Gonsalves, Jamaican educator and former principal
- Sir Kenneth Hall, Governor-General of Jamaica (2006-2009)
- Aaron Lawrence, Jamaican international footballer
- Merlene Ottey, Jamaican and Slovenian sprinter

== Former teachers ==
- Enid Gonsalves, Principal (1998-1999)
