= Jah Lloyd =

Jamaican singer, deejay and producer

- Also known as: Jah Lion, The Black Lion of Judah, Jah Ali
- Born: Patrick Lloyd Francis; 29 August 1947
- Origin: Point Hill, Saint Catherine Parish, Jamaica
- Died: 12 June 1999 (aged 51)
- Genres: Reggae
- Instrument: Vocals

Jah Lloyd, aka Jah Lion, The Black Lion of Judah, and Jah Ali (29 August 1947 – 12 June 1999) was a Jamaican reggae singer, deejay and producer.

== Biography ==
Patrick Lloyd Francis was born in Point Hill, Saint Catherine Parish in 1947. His mother died when he was eight, and he lived with his father, a farmer. After leaving school at the age of twelve he moved to Kingston and settled in Trench Town.

Francis began his career in the mid-1960s as a singer in The Mediators along with Fitzroy "Bunny" Simpson, and worked as a solo singer with tracks such as "Soldier Round the Corner" and "Know Yourself Blackman" recorded for producer Rupie Edwards. In the early 1970s, he worked as a record salesman before turning to production, recording the early efforts by Simpson's new group The Diamonds, later to be renamed The Mighty Diamonds. He also produced Mike Brooks' 1976 album What a Gathering, and The Revolutionaries 1979 album Goldmine Dub.

Recording as Jah Lloyd, he turned his hand to deejaying, enjoying hits in Jamaica with "Black Snowfall", "World Class", and "Beware of the Flour". He then recorded with Lee "Scratch" Perry, who decided to rename the deejay Jah Lion, the fruits of their association released on the Colombia Colly album in 1976 on Island Records. "Wisdom" from the album was featured in the soundtrack to the film Countryman, and "Soldier and Police War" (a deejay version of Junior Murvin's "Police & Thieves") topped the reggae chart. Reverting to Jah Lloyd, he secured a two-album deal Virgin Records' Frontline label, resulting in The Humble One and Black Moses.

Although he continued to record occasionally, he concentrated on production, working with artists such as Julie Charles. He had started his own Teem label in the mid-1970s, along with his younger brother Vincent, the label continuing on since, notably with CD reissues.

He had a brief participation in the song "Mi Estrella", included in the world's first Spanish reggae LP Reggae con amor by Carlos Díaz Granados, which was released in 1983.

Francis died of complications associated with bronchial asthma and chronic obstructive pulmonary disease on 12 June 1999.

== Albums ==
- Herbs of Dub (1974) DIP
- Soldier Round the Corner (1974) Plum Jam
- Colombia Colly (1976) Island
- The Humble One (1978) Front Line
- Black Moses (1979) Front Line
- Reggae Stick (1979) His Majesty
- Dread Lion Dub (1980) His Majesty
- In Action with Revolutionary Dub Band (1983) Vista Sounds
- The Good Old Days of the 70s (1998) Teem (with Dennis Alcapone)
- A Double Helping of Jah Lloyd and King Tubby Teem (combines both 1974 albums)
- Final Judgement Teem
