= Green Island, Jamaica =

Green Island
- Small Town
- Location within Jamaica
- Coordinates: 18.3894°N 78.2740°W
- Country: Jamaica
- Parish: Hanover

Green Island is a small town in northwestern Jamaica, located on the west coast between Negril and Lucea in the parish of Hanover. It is located close to Orange Bay.

== History ==
Green Island was once a thriving market town in the days when sugar was king supported by sugar plantations such as Harding Hall, Prospect, Saxham, Winchester, Rhodes Hall, Haughton and Glasgow. Sugar and other produce were exported in small schooners from the five or six wharves (such as Dixon Wharf) which were located in the harbor. Very little remains of these wharves today.

Saturdays were always bustling with activity as fishermen from as far as Negril, local rice farmers from Santoy and Westmoreland, and corn growers from St. Elizabeth selling their produce. Tobacco farmers would roll their dried leaves into a shape resembling rope, thus earning the name "Jackass Rope", and sell it by the yard for smoking in chalk pipes.

Since the development of Negril and easy access to public transportation, commercial activities have dwindled.
