= Whale tail (disambiguation) =

Whale tail is the Y-shaped waistband of a thong when visible above the waistline of low-rise jeans.

Whale tail may also refer to:

- Whale tail, the tail of a whale
- Whale's Tail Beach, a beach in Destin, Florida
- Whale's Tail Beach, a beach in Puntarenas, Costa Rica
- Whale's Tail Beach, a beach in Sandy Bay, Jamaica
- California specialty license plate
- Whale tail (automotive spoiler), particularly on the 1974 Porsche 911 Turbo
- Whaletail, a friction descender used in climbing
- Distal bifurcation of the anterior interventricular branch of left coronary artery

== See also ==
- Reverence (sculpture), a sculpture also called Whale Tails created by Jim Sardonis
- Walvisstaarten, a sculpture at the end of the tracks near De Akkers metro station of the Rotterdam Metro
