= Matthew Byndloss =

Jamaican politician (1721–1765)

Member of the House of Assembly of Jamaica for Saint Ann Parish
- In office 1750s–1765

Personal details
- Born: 1721
- Died: 1765 (aged 43–44) White Hall, Colony of Jamaica

Matthew Byndloss (1721 – 1765) was a Jamaican politician who served as a member of the House of Assembly of Jamaica for Saint Ann Parish from the mid-1750s up until his death in 1765, when he was killed during a slave rebellion at Whitehall plantation.
