= Albert Town =

Albert Town may refer to:

- Albert Town, Bahamas on Long Cay
- Albert Town, Jamaica; see Roads in Jamaica
- Albert Town, Malta, a hamlet in Marsa
- Albert Town, New Zealand
- Albert Town, Pembrokeshire, Wales
