= Kintyre (disambiguation) =

Kintyre may refer to:

- Kintyre, a peninsula in Scotland
- Kintyre, North Dakota, a community in the United States
- Kintyre, Jamaica, a town
- Kintyre uranium deposit, a uranium deposit in Western Australia
- Duke of Kintyre, a dukedom briefly held by Robert Bruce Stuart
- Marquess of Kintyre and Lorne, a subsidiary title of the Duke of Argyll
