= MBHS =

MBHS may refer to:

- Madhavrao Bhagwat High School, a private secondary school in VileParle India
- McKinney Boyd High School, a public high school located in McKinney, Texas
- Miami Beach High School, a public high school located in Miami Beach, Florida
- Monsignor Bonner High School, an all-male Catholic high school in the Archdiocese of Philadelphia
- Montgomery Blair High School, a public high school located in Montgomery County, Maryland
- Mount Blue High School, a public high school located in Farmington, Maine
- Mountain Brook High School, a public high school located in Mountain Brook, Alabama
- Murry Bergtraum High School, a public high school located in New York City
- Myrtle Beach High School, a public high school located in Myrtle Beach, South Carolina
- Morant Bay High School, a public high school located in Morant Bay, St. Thomas, Jamaica, West Indies
- Mission Bay High School, a public high school located in San Diego, California
- Mount Baker High School, a public high school located in Deming, Washington
- Morro Bay High School, a public high school located in Morro Bay, California
