= List of bays and coves of Jamaica =

List of bays and coves of Jamaica:

A bay is a body of water forming an indentation along the shoreline of a landmass, larger than a cove (i.e. Jade Cove) but smaller than a gulf (i.e. The Gulf or The Gulf of Mexico)

- Cagway Bay
- Orange Bay (Hanover Parish)
- Orange Bay (Portland Parish)
- Xtabi

The following are bays in Jamaica:

- Buff Bay
- ^{i} Montego Bay
- ^{i} Discovery Bay
- ^{i} Morant Bay
- Old Harbour Bay (OFFICIAL)
- Boston Bay (Coast of Portland)
- Runaway Bay
- Bull Bay

Key: ^{i} Not official. Mainly put because of 'Bay' at the ending...
