= Norbrook =

Coordinates: 18.052683°N 76.783361°W

- Neighbourhood
- Interactive map of Norbrook
- Country: Jamaica
- Parish: Saint Andrew
- City: Kingston

Population
  - Total: 15,000 (approximate)
- Time zone: UTC-5 (EST)

Norbrook is an upscale neighbourhood of the Kingston Metropolitan Area of Jamaica, with approximately 15,000 residents and is an important residential, shopping and commercial centre of the city itself. Norbrook is regarded as anywhere from the Immaculate Conception High School (in the South) to about 100m up "The Hill" (in the North).

Norbrook was home to the Late Jamaican Prime Minister Edward Seaga. It is also home to famous and wealthy Jamaican musicians like Shaggy, and Jimmy Cliff.

Norbrook has some of the most expensive and sought after homes in Jamaica, with some selling for over a million USD ($150,756,800 JMD). The median home prices can range from $500,000 to $1.8 million USD.

It is quite close to other luxury neighborhoods like Stony Hill, Cherry Gardens and Jacks Hill. The Constant Spring Golf Course is located in Norbrook. The shopping Centre Khemlani Mart is also located in the neighbourhood.
