= Duckenfield (ship) =

Several ships have been named Duckenfield for Duckenfield, Jamaica.

- Duckenfield (1792 ship) was launched on the Thames. She was primarily a West Indiaman but between 1803 and 1805 she served the Royal Navy as an armed defense ship. She was last listed in 1819.
- Duckenfield (1814 ship) was launched at Great Yarmouth. She was wrecked in 1835.
- SS Duckenfield (1875 ship) was launched at London and spent much of her career in Australian waters as a sixty-miler, traveling between Newcastle and Sydney. She was lost in 1889.
- Duckenfield (1890 ship) She was launched at the Paisley, Renfrewshire shipyard of Fleming & Ferguson for J & A Brown, christened SS Duckenfield. and used as a 'sixty-miler' collier. Later renamed and was sunk as Gyoun Maru, in 1944 during WWII.

== See also ==
- Duckenfield Hall (1783 ship)
