= Gil Bailey =

Caribbean radio broadcaster (1936–2020)

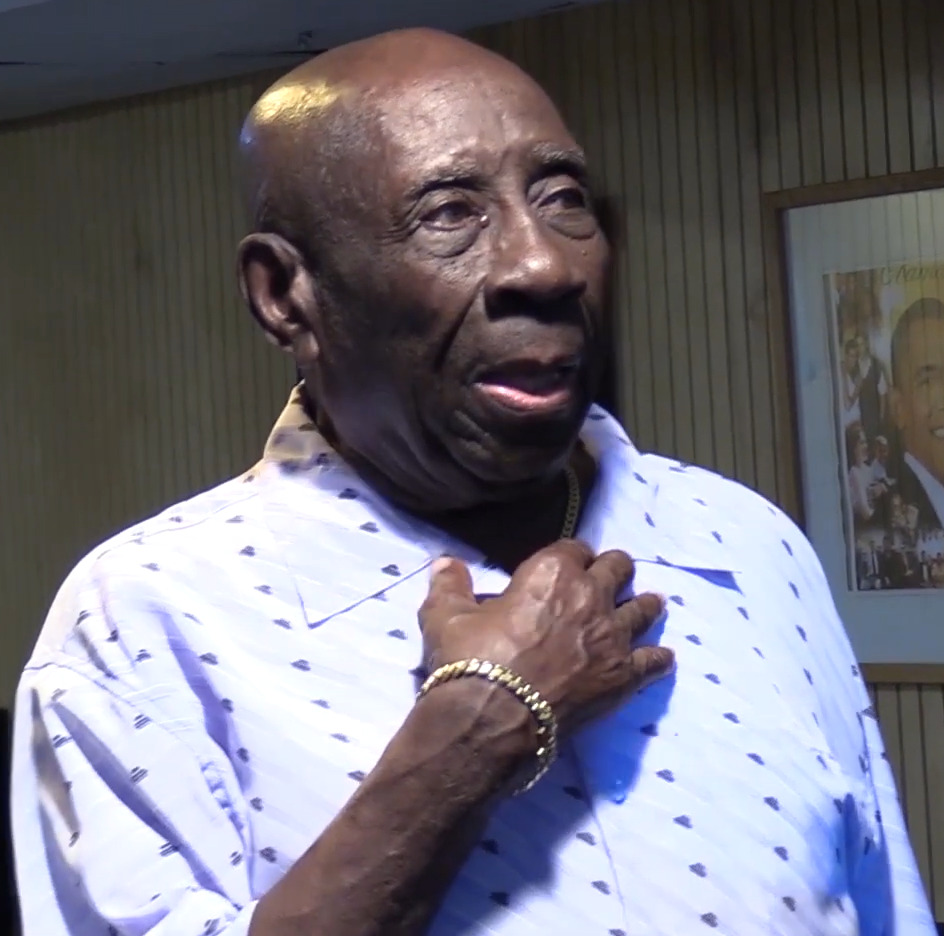
- Born: 11 January 1936; Airy Castle, St. Thomas Parish, Jamaica
- Died: 13 April 2020 (aged 83–84)
- Occupation: Radio broadcaster

Gil Bailey (11 January 1936 – 13 April 2020) was a Jamaican-American radio broadcaster, known as the "Godfather of Caribbean Radio" or "Godfather of Reggae Radio". Bailey died on 13 April 2020, from COVID-19.

== Life ==
Bailey was born in the Airy Castle village in Jamaica's St. Thomas Parish in 1936. In 1957, at the age of 21, he moved to London, where he gained employment as MC at Count Suckle's Cue Club. In 1967 Bailey relocated to New York where he married Pat Bailey. Pat and Gil started broadcasting in 1969, leasing time on WHBI in Newark.
