= Dalvey =

Dalvey may refer to

- Dalvey, Elgin, in Scotland
- Dalvey, Jamaica
- Dalvey railway station, Forres, Moray, Scotland
- Dalvay-by-the-Sea, Prince Edward Island, Canada
