= Hopeton, Westmoreland, Jamaica =

Settlement in Jamaica

Coordinates: 18.394°N 77.867°W

Location of Hopeton in Jamaica

Hopeton is a settlement in Jamaica.
