= Gordon Town, Jamaica =

Coordinates: 18°02′52″N 76°41′02″W

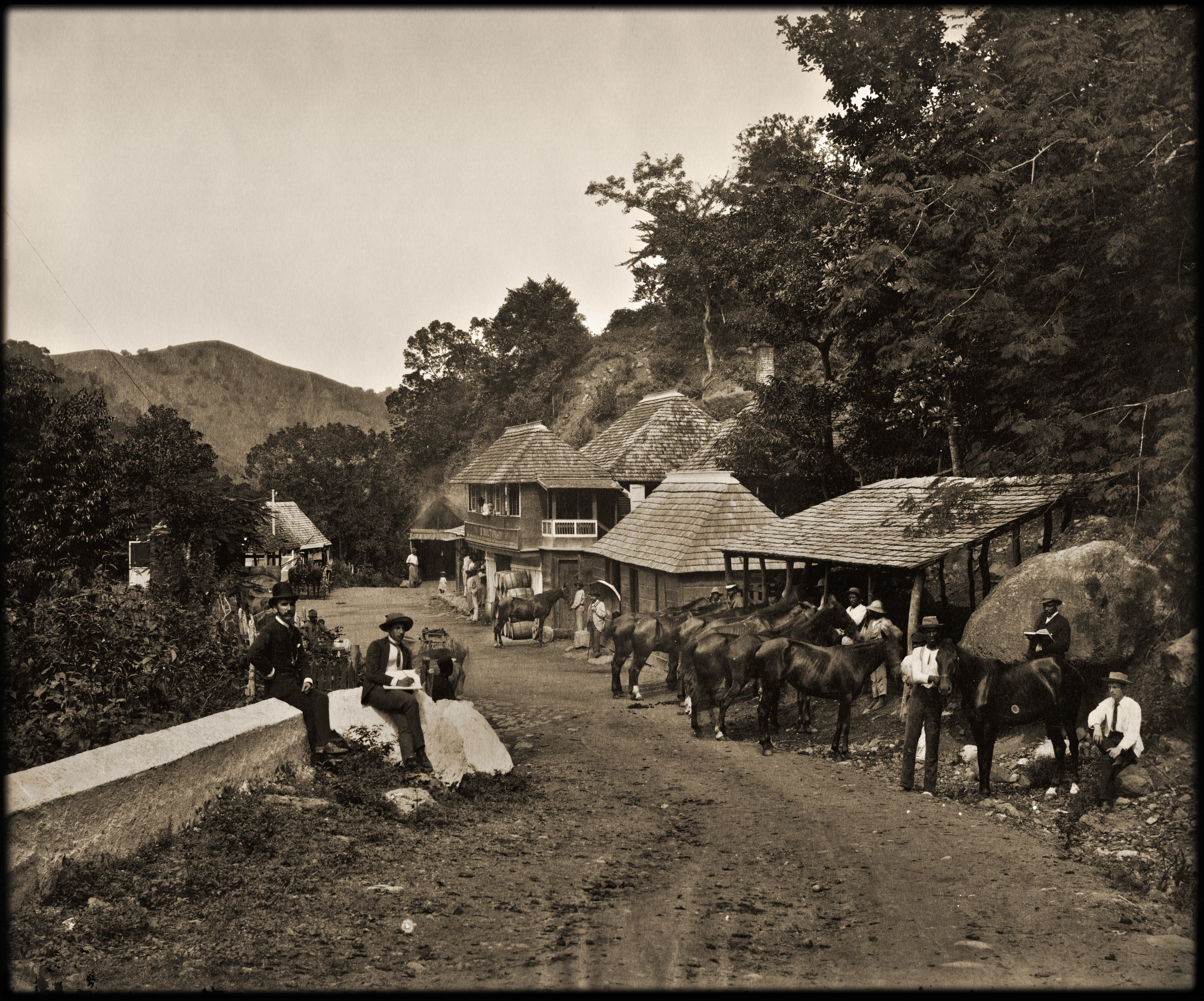
- Gordon Town in 1891

- Location within Jamaica
- Country: Jamaica
- County: Surrey

Population (2009)
  - Total: 1,067
- Time zone: EST
- Area code: +1-876

Gordon Town is a settlement in Saint Andrew Parish, Jamaica. It has a population of 1,067 as of 2009. Reggae musician Judah Eskender Tafari was born in Gordon Town, as was Henry Arthur Campbell (1873-1953), electrical engineer.

In 2019, Gordon Town Square was named after Louise Bennett-Coverley.
