= Croft's Hill, Jamaica =

Settlement in Jamaica

Coordinates: 18.128°N 77.208°W

Location of Croft's Hill in Jamaica

Croft's Hill is a settlement in Jamaica. Crofts Hill, is a name given the ending of British Colonial rule, Crofts is the Scottish word for small agricultural holdings. A sugar factory "Ludlow Works" which milled sugar canes from miles around, Arthur Seat, Kellits and near the British horse market. Closed as new developments unfolded. The lands that formed the Ludlow Works property were sold to cultivators, in small agricultural holdings.
