= Kellits, Jamaica =

Settlement in Jamaica

Coordinates: 18°10′22″N 77°13′51″W

Location of Kellits in Clarendon, Jamaica

Kellits is a settlement in Jamaica. It has a population of 2,658 as of 2009.

== History ==
Kellits may take its name from the landholding of Moses Kellet, assembly man for the parish of Clarendon in the 1750s, although records give even earlier reference to a George Kellet of Clarendon and his son Henry, born in 1698.
