= Gimme-Me-Bit =

- Settlement
- Location within Jamaica
- Coordinates: 17°52′36″N 77°18′27″W
- Country: Jamaica
- County: Middlesex
- Parish: Clarendon

Gimme-Me-Bit is a settlement within the parish of Clarendon in the south of Jamaica. It is approximately 5 km west of Hayes and 9 km southwest from the parish capital of May Pen.
