= San San, Portland, Jamaica =

Town in Jamaica

Coordinates: 18°10′28″N 76°23′51″W

San San is a town in the parish of Portland in Jamaica.

== Geography ==
San San is that bit of coast and mountain about 5 kilometers east of Port Antonio, Jamaica. San San encompasses about 2,000 acres (809 ha), from Drapers east to Blue Hole. The modern history of this part of Portland began when Captain Lorenzo Dow Baker, "the Banana King" purchased the western portion, then called Cold Harbour Estates in 1902 from the Crown. By 1911, after the Captain's death, his sons purchased the eastern portion of San San known as Fairfield, again from the Crown. In 1926 a further purchase was made of land east of Fairfield known as Pompey. The Baker property, including lands west of Drapers was used for grazing cattle and growing pimento. In 1941, when the Baker family returned to Boston, the property was sold to Cold Harbour Limited, of Kingston Jamaica.

The origins of the name are unclear although some have suggested it was the nickname that a gentleman from Portland had given to his Chinese girlfriend for whom he built a house in San San. In 1948 Cold Harbour Limited launched a campaign to: "...bring back Portland's wealth and beauty." Cold Harbour Estate was divided into over 300 lots, most only a couple of acres each, but with a few very large lots on or near the ocean. San San soon became at least the part-time home to many notables. The company started putting in services and even began building spec houses at Alligator Head, Goblin Hill, San San Hill and at Fern Hill. The residents included Baron Hans Heinrich Thyssen-Bornemisza whose family still owns the 8-acre property and home at the tip of Alligator Head. The Baron was certainly the most colourful character to inhabit San San. He was president of a family conglomerate that included manufacturers of plastics, glass and steel as well as container leasing and electric power companies. In addition to Alligator Head the Baron had homes in Italy, London, rural England, Paris, Monaco, Spain and Villa Favorita in Switzerland. His neighbours at the time included the brewery owner Senator Harland Molson, who also owned the Montreal Canadiens hockey team. On the hills above Blue Lagoon the property owners included Prince Sadruddin Aga Khan who had a 29-acre estate and the neighbouring Princess Island (a.k.a. Pellew Island).

In 1956 Cold Harbour sold 45 acres (18 ha) to Garfield Weston, the Canadian biscuit mogul, for the creation of Frenchman's Cove Resort.
