= Saint Thomas Parish, Jamaica =

Parish of Jamaica

Coordinates: 17°54′N 76°26′W

Saint Thomas Sen Tamas/Tahmas
- Parish
- Saint Thomas in Jamaica
- Country: Jamaica
- County: Surrey
- Capital: Morant Bay
- Major towns: Yallahs, Morant Bay, Seaforth, Port Morant, Bath, Golden Grove

Area
  - Total: 742.8 km^{2} (286.8 sq mi)
  - Rank: 9

Population (2018)
  - Total: 94,939
  - Density: 127.8/km^{2} (331.0/sq mi)

Saint Thomas (Jamaican Patois: Sen Tamas or Tahmas), once known as Saint Thomas in the East, is a suburban parish situated at the south eastern end of Jamaica, within the county of Surrey. It is the birthplace of Paul Bogle, designated in 1969 as one of Jamaica's seven National Heroes. Morant Bay, its chief town and capital, is the site of the Morant Bay Rebellion in 1865, of which Bogle was a leader.

Representative George William Gordon, a wealthy mixed race businessman and politician from this district, was tried and executed in 1865 under martial law on suspicion of directing the rebellion. Governor Eyre was forced to resign due to the controversy over his execution of Gordon and violent suppression of the rebellion. Gordon was designated in 1969 as a National Hero.

== Brief history ==
Saint Thomas was densely populated by the Taíno/Arawak when Christopher Columbus first came to the island in 1494. The Spaniards established cattle ranches at Morant Bay and Yallahs. In 1655, when the English captured Jamaica, they organised their new territory into a number of parishes. This was when Saint Thomas Parish was established, administering part of what is now Portland Parish, which was not established until 1722, and excluding what is now the western part of the parish, which was in the historic Saint David Parish. The Crown invited residents from other British colonies to settle here. About 1600 colonists, mainly from Nevis – including the Governor of Nevis, his wife, children – settled there. In a short time, however, two-thirds of them died of tropical fevers. The colony began to rebuild. They forced enslaved Africans to work the sugar cane plantations developed in the area. In 1674, the French Admiral Du Casse, sailed from Santo Domingo and landed at Morant Bay on 17 June. For a month, he raided local settlers, killing many and carrying off their slaves. Later, bands of Maroons settled in the mountains of St. Thomas.

=== Saint Thomas in the East ===
In 1676, when Saint Thomas in the Vale Parish, the parish became known as "Saint Thomas in the East Parish". It retained this name until 1 May 1867 when the parish system of colonial administration was reformed by Governor John Peter Grant who introduced A Law to Reduce the Number of Parishes (1867/No.20).

In the 18th century they joined with the Maroons in Portland parish to form the Windward Maroons.

Slaves long constituted the majority of the population of the parish. In 1834 the British government abolished slavery, ending it fully in 1838 after a four-year "apprenticeship." But decades later, freedmen struggled to gain land to cultivate and generally worked at very low wages. As they generally could not afford to pay the poll tax, so were excluded from voting.

=== Morant Bay Rebellion ===
In October 1865, the Morant Bay rebellion took place in St Thomas. Formerly enslaved people and their descendants all over Jamaica were discontented about the social injustices, particularly on the question of land tenure. Baptist deacon and preacher Paul Bogle of St. Thomas parish led a delegation of small farmers who walked 72 kilometres (45 mi) to present their grievances to Edward John Eyre the Governor of Jamaica in the capital Spanish Town, but they were denied an audience.

Angered after a case in which a peasant was convicted of trespass on a long-abandoned plantation, on 11 October, Paul Bogle and his followers, armed with sticks and machetes, marched to the Court House in Morant Bay where a vestry meeting was being held. The authorities read the Riot Act, but the protestors ignored it. A few people began to throw stones at the volunteer militia, who fired into the crowd and killed seven people. Later the mob reorganized and returned, setting fire to the Court House and nearby buildings. When the custos, Maximillian von Ketelhodt, and others tried to leave the burning building, the mob killed them. A total of 25 people died on both sides that day.

During the next two days the peasants took over St. Thomas parish. The governor declared martial law in the parish and ordered troops to suppress the rebellion. More than 430 people were killed outright by soldiers in suppression of the rebellion, and more than 1,000 homes were burned to the ground, leaving thousands of people homeless. They arrested more than 300, executing some and punishing many innocent people.

Representative George William Gordon, who was in touch with Paul Bogle, spoke out for the workers in the House of Assembly in Kingston. The governor ordered him arrested and returned to Morant Bay, where he was tried under martial law for conspiracy and hanged on 23 October. The following day Bogle was captured by Jamaican Maroons from Moore Town, handed over to the authorities, and hanged.

A public outcry in Great Britain led to the appointment of a Royal Commission to investigate events. Although Eyre was forced to resign and twice charged with murder, his case never went to trial.

In 1969, Paul Bogle was named a National Hero of Jamaica, as were George William Gordon and three others.

== Geography and demography ==
Saint Thomas is located at latitude 18°05'N, longitude 76°40'W, to the south of Portland, and the east of St. Andrew. With an area of 742.8 square kilometres (286.8 sq mi), it ranks as Jamaica's ninth-largest parish. It is very mountainous, with ranges that include the Port Royal Mountains, stretching from above Newcastle in St Andrew, to Albion in St Thomas; the Queensbury Ridge, between the Yallahs and Negro rivers; and to the extreme south, an isolated ridge called Yallahs Hill, with its highest elevation 730 metres (2,394 ft) above sea level. The Blue Mountains form the northern border of the parish.

The parish contains large wetlands areas, comprising the coastal area between Morant Bay and Hector's River. There are also many cliffs and beaches.

There are three main rivers in the parish; the Yallahs River, measuring 36.9 kilometres (22.9 mi) long; the Morant River, measuring 21.9 kilometres (13.6 mi) long; and the Plantain Garden River, measuring 34.9 kilometres (21.7 mi) long. The latter is the only eastward flowing river in the island.

The total population of the parish is 94,410. The ethnic makeup of Saint Thomas is 88.2% Black, 7.6% Asian, 3.2% White, and 1% Other.

The parish has a relatively youthful population. Approximately 54.7% of the parish's population was 29 years or younger: children under 0–14 years accounted for 27% of the population, youths of 15 to 29 years accounted for 27.7%. The working-age population (15–64 years) accounted for 64.1%, reflecting the national distribution. The elderly, 65 years and over, accounted for 8.9%; this figure is lower than the national proportion of 11.1% reported by the Economic and Social Survey Jamaica (2010).

== Commerce ==
Agriculture plays a vital part in the economy of Saint Thomas. Sugar and bananas were the main items produced for export.The St. Thomas Parish sugar mill Golden Grove closed in July 2019. Most small farmers produce domestic and orchard crops, which provide the main source of employment. Serge Island Dairies is located in the parish. St. Thomas also has many factories for food processing and electrical equipment.

Current efforts are being made by Upliftment Jamaica to create, support and provide opportunities to the people of St. Thomas, and to encourage economic and social transformation on a community and county-wide basis. Over 10,000 people benefit annually from this organization, via year-round projects and events, with numbers rapidly increasing.

== Transportation ==
=== Roads ===
The coast of St. Thomas is skirted by the A4, which runs from Kingston to Annotto Bay. The primary secondary road runs east to west along the foot of the Blue Mountains from Golden Grove to Richmond Vale, with north-south connecting roads linking it to the A4 at Pleasant Hill, Port Morant, Morant Bay, Church Corner, Belvedere, Yallahs, Albion and Eleven Mile.

=== Rail ===
Rail transport in St. Thomas was formerly limited to estate light railways, such as the one serving the former Bowden banana shipment port. All have ceased operation.

=== Sea ===
The Morant Point Lighthouse guards the easternmost tip of the parish and the island.

== Attractions ==
- Bath Botanical Gardens – one of the oldest botanical gardens in the western hemisphere. Located in the town of Bath
- Bath Fountain – mineral spring located in the town of Bath
- Blue Mountains – mountain range extending over a portion of St. Thomas parish
- Judgement Cliff – sheer cliff face near Easington created in 1692 by the same earthquake that destroyed Port Royal
- Lyssons Beach – public beach located in the town of Lyssons
- Morant Bay Fort – fort dating back to 1773
- Reggae Falls - waterfall and attraction formed from a man-made dam in the community of Hillside, adjacent to Seaforth
- Stony Gut – site of Paul Bogle's former chapel, burned during the suppression of the rebellion

== Education ==
St. Thomas is home to several secondary institutions of education. Morant Bay High School, established in 1961, was the first of its kind in the parish of St. Thomas. High schools in St. Thomas include:

- St. Thomas Technical High School
- Morant Bay High School
- Paul Bogle High School
- Robert Lightbourne High School
- Seaforth High School
- Yallahs High School

== Politics ==
Saint Thomas Parish consists of two parliamentary constituencies: Saint Thomas Eastern and Saint Thomas Western.

== Notable people ==
- Winston Blake – Sound system pioneer, music producer, founder of Merritone Music
- Paul Bogle – Baptist preacher, Leader of the 1865 Morant Bay Rebellion, Jamaican National Hero
- Bushman – Reggae artist
- Juliet Cuthbert – Olympic and IAAF World Championships medalist
- Len Garrison – Co-founder of the Black Cultural Archives
- George William Gordon – Businessman and politician, representative to the House of Assembly, associated with the 1865 Morant Bay Rebellion and Jamaican National Hero
- Jermaine Hue – Former Jamaican national football player
- Natty King – Reggae artist
- Morgan Heritage – Reggae band
- Hansle Parchment – Olympic and World Championships medalist
- Popcaan – Reggae artist
- Alvas Powell – National football player
- Tarrus Riley – Reggae artist
- Toni-Ann Singh – Singer and Miss World 2019
- Skillibeng – Reggae artist
- Barrington Watson – Jamaican painter who maintained a residence at Orange Park near Yallahs in St. Thomas

== See also ==
- Airy Castle
- Barking Lodge
- Bath
- Bull Bay
- Dalvey
- Duckenfield
- Easington
- Golden Grove
- Hagley Gap
- Hampton Court
- Lyssons
- Morant Bay
- Port Morant
- Seaforth
- Trinity Ville
- Yallahs
