= Dwayne Ambusley =

Jamaican international footballer (born 1980)

Personal information
- Date of birth: 10 August 1980 (age 46)
- Height: 1.80 m (5 ft 11 in)
- Position: Midfielder

Team information
- Current team: Montego Bay United

Youth career
- Rusea's High School

Senior career*
Years	Team	Apps	(Gls)
- Legend FC
- Mount Pelier
2011–	Montego Bay United	132	(2)

International career^{‡}
2016–	Jamaica	3	(0)
- * Club domestic league appearances and goals as of 16:03, 26 February 2017 (UTC) ‡ National team caps and goals as of 16:03, 26 February 2017 (UTC)

Dwayne Ambusley (born 10 August 1980) is a Jamaican international footballer who plays for Montego Bay United, as a midfielder.

== Career ==
=== Club ===
Ambusley has played for Rusea's High School, Legend FC, Mount Pelier and Montego Bay United. Ambusley also coached during his time at Montego Bay United

=== International ===
He made his senior international debut for Jamaica in 2016.
