= Trelawny Parish =

Parish of Jamaica

Coordinates: 18°23′N 77°38′W

Trelawny Trilaani/Chrilaani
- Parish
- Trelawny in Jamaica
- Country: Jamaica
- County: Cornwall
- Capital: Falmouth
- Major towns: Clarks Town, Duncans, Wakefield, Albert Town

Area
  - Total: 874 km^{2} (337 sq mi)
  - Rank: 5

Population (2012)
  - Total: 75,558
  - Density: 86.5/km^{2} (224/sq mi)
- Demonym: Trelawnyen
- Website: Parish Profile: Trelawny

Trelawny (Jamaican Patois: Trilaani or Chrilaani) is a parish in the county of Cornwall in northwest Jamaica. Its capital is Falmouth. It is bordered by the parishes of Saint Ann in the east, Saint James in the west, and Saint Elizabeth and Manchester in the south. Trelawny is known for producing several Olympic sprinters.

== History ==
In 1770, the wealthy planters in St James and St Ann succeeded in having sections of those parishes become the parish of Trelawny as they were too far from administrative centres. Trelawny was named after Sir William Trelawny, 6th Baronet, the then Governor of Jamaica, whose prominent family had originated at the manor of Trelawny in the parish of Pelynt in Cornwall, England. The first capital was Martha Brae, located 3 kilometres (1.9 mi) inland from Rock Bay.

Trelawny is best known for its sugar estates and sugar cane mills. It had more sugar estates than any other parish, so there was need for a sea coast town to export it. Falmouth became a thriving seaport and social centre. The town had two of its own newspapers; The Falmouth Post and The Falmouth Gazette.

Trelawny was also home to the largest group of Jamaican Maroons. A 1739 treaty between the Maroons and the English gave the Maroons freedom and land, which effectively put a stop to their raids on the plantations. However, a second Maroon uprising in 1795 led to about 600 Maroons being exiled to Nova Scotia, Canada, and later to Sierra Leone in Africa, in 1800.

In 2007, the opening ceremony for the ICC Cricket World Cup was held in Trelawny Parish.

== Geography ==
Trelawny is located at latitude 18°15'N, longitude 77°46'W. It has an area of 874 km^{2}, making it the fifth largest parish on the island. It has a population of 75,558 as of 2012. Most of the parish is flat, with wide plains such as Queen of Spain's Valley, 230 metres (750 ft) above sea level, and Windsor, 180 metres (580 ft) above sea level. Most of southern Trelawny is around 230 metres (750 ft) above sea level. The highest point in the parish is Mount Ayr which is 910 metres (3,000 ft) above sea level.

The southern section of Trelawny is part of the Cockpit Country, and is uninhabitable. It is therefore a natural reserve for flora and fauna; most of Jamaica's 27 endemic bird species can be found there, along with yellow snakes, and the giant swallowtail butterfly, the largest butterfly in the Western Hemisphere.

Most of the parish has the typical limestone features of sinkholes, caves, and underground passages. There are about 48 caves, most with phosphate gatherings. These include the Windsor Cave and Carambi Cave (known for its beauty and phosphate deposits). There are several other caves which have Taino carvings on the walls. There are also several underground conduits, with the longest running for 24 kilometres (15 mi). The main rivers are the Martha Brae, Rio Bueno, Cane and Quashie Rivers.

== Commerce ==
Trelawny's sources of employment are based on agriculture, manufacturing, and tourism. Rum and sugar are Trelawny's principal products. Other crops include bananas, yams, strawberries, vegetables, pimento, coffee, ginger, papaya and coconut. Though the fishing industry is declining, Trelawny still produces a large amount of fish. There are ten beaches along the coast, with more than 30 boats each, as well as 27 fish ponds.

There are 25 factories in the parish. These produce sugar, rum, and apparel, among other things. Two of the eight remaining sugar factories in Jamaica are in Trelawny —Hampden Sugar Factory, and Trelawny Sugar, formerly Long Pond Sugar Factory.

== Politics ==
Trelawny Parish has two MPs and two constituencies; Trelawny Northern and Trelawny Southern.

== Notable citizens ==
The former Prime Minister of Jamaica, Hugh Lawson Shearer, was from the area. Shirley Nathan-Pulliam, a Jamaican-American politician who served in the Maryland State Senate, was also born in Trelawny.

Trelawny Parish is the birthplace of several track and field athletes: Usain Bolt, Veronica Campbell-Brown, Marvin Anderson, Ricardo Chambers, Omar Brown, Michael Frater, Lerone Clarke, Dane Hyatt, Rosemarie Whyte, Michael Greene, Inez Turner, Debbie-Ann Parris, Sanya Richards, Ben Johnson and Warren Weir. It is also the birthplace basketball players Samardo Samuels and Kentan Facey.

The supercentenarian Violet Brown (1900–2017), who was at a time the oldest verified living person in the world, was born and resided in Trelawny. Other notable citizens include DJ Kamau Preston, dancehall artists Anthony B and Charly Black, councillor Eunice Campbell-Clark, scholar Rex Nettleford, and American footballer Atari Bigby.
