= Yallahs River =

Coordinates: 17°52′N 76°36′W

Location
- Country: Jamaica

The Yallahs River is a river in the parish of Saint Thomas, Jamaica.

Major landslides have developed in the Upper Yallahs River Watershed. As a result, the river carries a greater silt load and scours its banks far more quickly. The Yallahs Ford downstream has widened tremendously, leaving the coastal route vulnerable to inundation after heavy rainstorms.

== See also ==
- List of rivers of Jamaica
- Yallahs
