= Watt Town =

Jamaican pilgrimage site

- Town
- Location in Jamaica
- Coordinates: 18.30°N 77.41°W
- Country: Jamaica
- Parish: Saint Ann

Population (2011)
  - Total: 434
- Time zone: UTC+2 (CAT)

Watt Town is a settlement located in Saint Ann Parish, Jamaica. It is the principal sacred site in Revivalism, an Afro-American religion in Jamaica which had 36,294 adherents according to a 2011 census. In 2024 the "Pilgrimage to Watt Town" was inscribed on the Representative List of the Intangible Cultural Heritage of Humanity by UNESCO.

== History and pilgrimage ==
The "Great Revival" in Jamaica (1860–1861) saw increased interest in African traditions and practices among Jamaica's African population, who syncretised them with the Christianity of mission houses to produce a new religious movement which came to be called Revivalism. In the early years, Revivalism was practiced despite strong opposition from the Christian Church, and has two main branches: Zion Revival (founded in 1860), which more prominently features Christian influences and involves veneration of sky spirits, and Pokumina or '61 (founded in 1861), which favours African traditional practices and venerates earth spirits. Revival bands are groups or 'churches' which venerate ancestral spirits. Sacred spaces are called "seals".

Watt Town is sometimes said to have been founded in 1869 by a "Henry Downer", though there are earlier records mentioning a "Mother of Seal" and "Mother of Bands", meaning it was likely founded earlier. According to UNESCO, Watt Town was a refuge for enslaved Africans. The pilgrimage to Watt Town (which dates back to its founding) occurs quarterly, starting and ending on the first Thursdays of March and October respectively (Thursday is Earth/Mourning Day in Ashanti religion in modern-day Ghana, and is also a special day among people of the western Congo Basin). The Jerusalem Schoolroom and Headquarters in Watt Town are important places in particular. The pilgrimage to Watt Town and subsequent Gathering involve music, dancing, rituals, and worship. Some rituals involve myal (possession). Watt Town is viewed as a place for adherents to communicate with and worship ancestors, including those who lived in Africa. On 4 March 2021 amid the COVID-19 pandemic, despite social distancing laws passed by the government, people still journeyed to Watt Town for fear of angering their ancestral spirits.
