= Big Woods, Westmoreland, Jamaica =

Settlement in Jamaica

Coordinates: 18.403°N 77.110°W

Location of Big Woods in Jamaica

Big Woods is a settlement in Jamaica.
