= Frome, Jamaica =

Frome
- Town
- Location within Jamaica
- Coordinates: 18.2929°N 78.1535°W
- Country: Jamaica
- Parish: Westmoreland

Frome is a small village centered on the sugar mill of the eponymous estate in Westmoreland, Jamaica.

== See also ==
- List of cities and towns in Jamaica
