= Bull Savanna, Jamaica =

Settlement in Saint Elizabeth Parish, Jamaica

Coordinates: 17.882°N 77.593°W

Location of Bull Savanna in Jamaica

Bull Savannah is a settlement in the Saint Elizabeth Parish of Jamaica. It is located north of Alligator Pond and features Bull Savannah Police Station and Bull Savanna Primary School. The settlement has a population of over 6,000 people.
