= Kamau Preston =

Jamaican musician (born 1979)

- Also known as: DJ Monk
- Born: Canute Kamau Preston; 3 January 1979 (age 47); Trelawny Parish, Jamaica
- Genres: Reggae, hip hop, electro house, dancehall, reggae fusion
- Occupations: DJ, record producer, television presenter
- Years active: 2001–present
- Website: kamaupreston.com

Canute Kamau Preston (born 3 January 1979), known as Kamau Preston, formerly DJ Monk, is a Jamaican musician, international DJ, record producer and television personality. A native Jamaican DJ Kamau Preston is known mostly for his work as a celebrity DJ, and for his contributions to the Caribbean house music genre. He is best known for his work as the resident DJ at the Atlantis Paradise Island, Bahamas, as the personal DJ to the likes of New York Giants mogul, and hotelier Jonathan M. Tisch, Howard Stern and fashion designer Steve Madden.

== Early and personal life ==
Preston was born in Trelawny Parish, Jamaica. He started his public career in Jamaica as a roadie for the resident band Impulse at Trelawny Beach Hotel. Later he became the house DJ at several clubs and resorts like luxury resort Half Moon in Montego Bay, Jamaica. Preston moved to the U.S. in 2004 where he currently resides with his wife Jo Blackwell-Preston (Top Colorist and owner of New York City's Dop Dop Salon) and two children.

== Career ==
Kamau Preston is the founder and CEO of CK Preston LLC, a multinational music production company based in New York City. Since moving to the U.S. Preston has played sets across the world. He opened for Bon Jovi in 2007 at the 10-day opening of Newark's, state-of-the-art Prudential Center sports and entertainment venue. In 2007 Preston was asked to DJ the Rita Hayworth Alzheimer's Association Gala at the Waldorf Astoria New York. Preston has worked as the resident DJ for L'Oreal, spinning at their 100th Anniversary in Paris. In 2013 Preston broke onto the Jamaican political scene, playing for parliamentary candidate/TV Hostess Paula Kerr-Jarret, and former Jamaican Prime Minister Edward Seaga.

== Present ==
Preston is currently working on debuting his latest project, fusing both reggae and house elements creating a new genre of music. Additionally Preston is working on developing a new format television series with celebrity chef Collin Brown for JTV, TBA. Preston is currently anticipating the release of his own graphic novel in winter 2013.

== Discography ==
=== DJ mixes ===
- Kamau Preston – Quickie (2011)
- Kamau Preston – TRAP...DM (2013)
- Richie Stephens – TBA (2013)

== Television and film appearances ==
Film
Year	Film	Role	Notes
2011	Trophy Kids	Himself	Feature Film
Television
Year	Title	Role	Notes
2013	CVM TV Naked Truth	Guest Star (Himself)	1 Episode
2013	"TBA"	Host / Co-Executive Producer	Jamaican TV Series
