= Judah Eskender Tafari =

Jamaican musical artist (1957–2020)

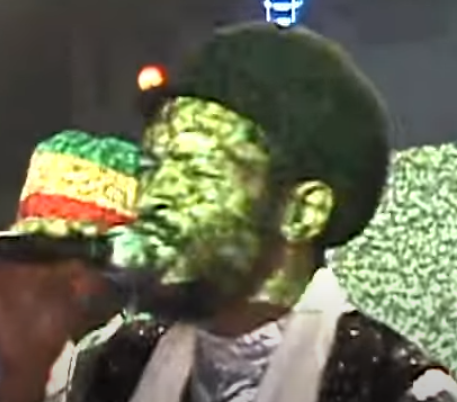
- Judah Eskender Tafari in 2009

Background information
- Born: Ronald William Merrills; 23 July 1957; Kingston, Jamaica
- Origin: Gordon Town, Jamaica
- Died: 5 June 2020 (aged 62) Burbank, California, US
- Genre: Reggae
- Years active: 1970s–2020
- Labels: Studio One, Black Redemption

Ronald William Merrills (23 July 1957 – 5 June 2020), better known by the stage name Judah Eskender Tafari was a Jamaican reggae vocalist and musician, known for his distinct vocal tone, and spiritual outlook. His records on the Studio One label are regarded as classics. He died in 2020 after a lengthy illness.

== Career ==
Tafari grew up poor in Gordon Town, Jamaica. He taught himself to play guitar and formed a group with friends 'The Captive Lions' who became the backup group for singer Asher Mackafat. Tafari learnt to sing harmony. Mackafat was a Twelve Tribes member and the band, and Tafari himself, were absorbed into the group from 1976 to 1978, becoming known as the Twelve Tribes Band. Tafari remained a member of the Twelve Tribes organization until his death. Fellow musicians Bagga Walker and Pablove Black introduced Tafari to record producer Coxsone Dodd as a potential vocalist. Feeling he needed a "vocalist name" Tafari appealed to a visiting Ethiopian Princess who suggested several amharic words. He chose 'Eskender' as it meant 'commander'.

From 1978 till 1980 Dodd released a run of six singles on his Studio One label, "Jah Light", "Rastafari Tell You", "Always Trying", "Conquer Me", "Danger In Your Eyes" and "Just Another Day", on some of which Tafari not only sang but also played guitar and arranged. An album African Blood was scheduled but never released.

Tafari left the Studio One fold, playing bass with the Generation Gap band in Jamaica, and Brigadier Jerry in Canada. On a visit to the USA in 1986, Tafari rediscovered his fame as a vocalist, and recorded some songs for WFMU DJ Jeff Sarge, which trickled out on the Shaka Label over the next 10 years. After living for several years in Los Angeles, Tafari later settled in Brooklyn, and did steady touring work, both as vocalist and musician. In 1993 he recorded in England for producer Gussie P, resulting in the single "Live By The Gun" in 1994, and an album, Rastafari Tell You, in 1995. Tracks from these sessions continued to be released into the 2000s. Also in the 2000s a number of the original Studio One tracks, and extended mixes thereof, were released on other labels such as Heartbeat Records and Soul Jazz Records.

In the mid-2000s Tafari began performing at the New York City-based Black Redemption Sounds of Praises sound system's live sessions, and between 2007 and 2010 selector Ras Kush produced and released a series of hits on the Black Redemption Label. This, and international touring with Black Redemption, led to greater recognition and, in the subsequent decade, a steady stream of releases on other roots labels such as Rhygin, Blackboard Jungle, King Shiloh, Revolutionary Brothers, Blackheart, Universal Love, Bredrin Records, and Roots Youth records.

He recorded several songs with producer Tom Chasteen and the band Natural Numbers, which resulted in the EP Listen to the Lion, released in May 2020.

Tafari died from cancer on 5 June 2020.

== Discography ==
=== Albums ===
- Rastafari Tell You (1995), Gussie P
- The Builder (1998), Tan-Yah
- Long Suffering (2019), Rhygin
- Divine Right (2020), Black Redemption
- Life (2020), Black Redemption

=== EPs ===
- Judah's Gift: Love and Peace (2013), Mind Music Production
- Judah's Gift: Upliftment (2016), Mind Music Production
- Listen to the Lion (2020), Tuff Gong International - Natural Numbers feat. Judah Eskender Tafari

=== Singles ===
- "Danger in Your Eyes" (1978), Studio One - as Ronald Merrills
- "Never Conquer" (1978), Studio One
- "Jah Light" (1978), Studio One
- "Rastafari Tell You" (1979), Studio One
- "Just Another Day" (1979), Studio One
- "Always Trying" (1979), Studio One
- "Live by the Gun" (1994), Gussie P
- "Can't Say" (1995), Shaka
- "Up In Harlem" (1997), Eternal Life
- "Look Down Jah" (1997), Eternal Life
- "Mighty Long" (1997), Eternal Life
- "Closer" (1997), Eternal Life
- "Live by the Gun" (2002), Gussie P
- "African Blood" (2002), Gussie P
- "Jah Light" (2002), Sip-a-Cup
- "Life" (2007), Black Redemption
- "Home Sweet Home" (2009), Black Legacy
- "Cleanse" (2010), Black Redemption
- "Government Man" (2010), Black Redemption
- "A Chant of Judah" (2010), Black Redemption
- "Choose One" (2010), Black Redemption
- "The Real Things" (2010), Black Redemption
- "Land Of Confusion (Ticklah Remix)" (2010), Black Redemption/Lion Dub
- "Peace" (2012), Descendant
- "Jah Love" (2013), Black Redemption
- "Sitting in the Park" (2013), Rhygin
- "Fret Not" (2014), Blackheart Warriors
- "Crying" (2015), King Shiloh
- "Danger in Your Eyes" (2015), Revolutionary Brothers Music
- "New Dawning" (2016), FarEye Entertainment
- "Sold for Naught" (2017), Blackheart Warriors
- "When I Was Young" (2017), Great Wall
- "Coming" (2018), Universal Love
- "Left Us Empty" (2018), Blackboard Jungle
- "Time to Love" (2018), I Lion
- "Exalted One" (2018), Bredrin
- "Get Some Love" (2019), Roots Youths
