= Guy's Hill, Jamaica =

Coordinates: 18.248°N 76.999°W

Guy's Hill Town Guys Hill
- Town
- Nickname: Guyzill/ Guysill
- Interactive map of Guy's Hill Town
- Country: Jamaica
- County: Middlesex
- Parish: St Catherine Parish

Population
  - Total: 3,198
  - Estimate (2009): 3,000
- Time zone: UTC-5 (EST)
- Area code: 876

Location of Guy's Hill in Jamaica

Guy's Hill is a settlement in Jamaica. It has a population of 3,198 as of 2009.
