= Riverton City, Jamaica =

Coordinates: 18.0154°N 76.8476°W

Riverton City, St Andrew, Jamaica is a landfill site on the outskirts of Kingston.

In March 2015, it was the site of a major fire, starting on the 11th of March. The poor air quality brought activities in Kingston to a halt, as businesses, schools and other services were forced to close down early. The Medical Association of Jamaica called on the Cabinet to tackle the public health risks, saying that at least 600 people had attended public health facilities as a result of smoke inhalation.
