= Cascade, Jamaica =

Settlement in Hanover Parish, Jamaica

Location in Jamaica

Cascade is a settlement in Hanover Parish, Jamaica.

Reggae musician Jah Cure grew up in Cascade.
