= Mike Brooks (singer) =

Jamaican reggae singer (born 1953)

- Also known as: Mikey Brooks, Prince Michael
- Born: Edmund Brooks; 1953 (age 72–73); Westmoreland, Jamaica
- Origin: Jamaica
- Genres: Reggae
- Years active: Early 1970s–present

Edmund Brooks (born 1953), known as Mike Brooks, Mikey Brooks, and Prince Michael, is a Jamaican reggae singer who has been active since the early 1970s.

== Biography ==
Brooks performed regularly at the 'Idler's Rest' on Chancery Lane in Kingston, and landed a job at Channel One Studios building rhythms with the group Skin Flesh & Bone. His first record release was with the group The Tots (who also included Norris Reid and in Brooks' words 'a guy called Tony'), who released a single in 1975 called "Earth Is The Fullness", recorded at Black Ark studio, and released on Brooks' Harvest label. The band was not successful, but Brooks would often contribute to recording sessions at the Black Ark organized by Jah Lloyd. Brooks re-emerged as a solo singer in the mid-1970s, working with producers such as Alvin Ranglin, and achieving hits with singles such as "Guiding Star" (1977), "Come Sister Love", "Grooving", "Open The Door", and "What a Gathering". He also recorded the combination single "Who Have Eyes To See" with Prince Far I. He moved to the United Kingdom and joined the British Reggae Artists Against Famine Appeal, singing on the "Let's Make Africa Green Again" charity single. In 1990 he recorded an album with Glen Brown, and followed it in 1995 with Hardcore Lover, an album on which he was joined by Delroy Wilson and Pat Kelly.

Brooks also worked as a producer, and along with Jah Lloyd, set up his own 'Teams' label in the late 1970s.

== Albums ==
- What a Gathering (1976) Burning Sounds
- True Love (1977) Harvest
- Rum Drinker (197?) Duke Reid
- One Love (1983) Vista Sounds
- Respect Due (1985) Good Times
- Mike Brooks and Glen Brown Meet Rhythm Foundation ina Sound Clash (1990) Rhythm Foundation
- Hardcore Lover (1995) Pre
- The Good Old Days Of The 70s (1998) (Joseph Cotton and Mike Brooks)
- They Trying to Conquer (2000) Charm
- Anthology 1972-1985 (2001) M10
- Need Love (2002) Teams (as Prince Michael)
- Book of Reveletion (2003) I Sound
- The Earth Is the Fullness (2004) Moll Selekta
- Just The Vibes Moll Selekta (Mike Brooks and Various Artists)
- Break Free - Treasure Isle Classics (2006) Teams
- Living My Culture (2005) Trojan Records
- Rise Up (2006)
- Cross Over (2006)
- The Lost Album Nocturne (Mike Brooks and U-Roy)
- Dub Zone Teams (Mike Brooks and Stamper Doctor)
- Solid Ground (Mikey Brooks and The Upsetters)
- Gimme Your Love, Harvest
