= Bog, Westmoreland, Jamaica =

Settlement in Jamaica

Coordinates: 18.102°N 77.015°W

Location of Bog in Jamaica

Bog is a settlement in Jamaica. It has a population of 13,889 as of 2009.
