= Old Pera, Jamaica =

Old Pera
- Fishing village
- Location within Jamaica
- Coordinates: 17.8738°N 76.3140°W
- Country: Jamaica
- Parish: St Thomas

Old Pera is a small fishing village in south-eastern Jamaica, 15 minutes east of Morant Bay. The village is historic, with mountain and Caribbean sea views.

The area is known for its Kumina, a ritual celebration of a recent death based on reverence for ancestors.
