= New Holland, Saint Elizabeth, Jamaica =

Settlement in Saint Elizabeth, Jamaica

Coordinates: 18.324°N 78.335°W

New Holland is a settlement in Saint Elizabeth, Jamaica.
