= Duckenfield (1814 ship) =

History

United Kingdom
- Name: Duckenfield
- Namesake: Duckenfield, Jamaica
- Builder: Preston, Great Yarmouth
- Launched: 13 September 1814
- Fate: Abandoned 1 December 1835

General characteristics
- Class & type: 36725/94, or 370 (bm)

Duckenfield was launched in 1814 at Great Yarmouth. She spent most of her career as a West Indiaman. Between 1831 and 1833 she sailed to Australia and Bengal. She then started sailing across the North Atlantic. She became waterlogged; her surviving crew were rescued on 1 December 1835. They left her in a sinking state.

== Career ==
Duckenfield first appeared in Lloyd's Register in 1814 with H. Wood, master, C. Nockels, owner, and trade London–Jamaica.

Year	Master	Owner	Trade	Source & notes
1815	H. Wood	C. Nockels	London–Jamaica	Lloyd's Register (LR)
1820	Wood	Nockels	London–Jamaica	Register of Shipping (RS)

On 22 December 1824 Duckenfield ran foul of HMS Niemen in Cowes Roads.

Year	Master	Owner	Trade	Source & notes
1825	D[avid] T[homson] Lyon	Cox & Co.	London–Honduras	LR; "wants repair"
1830	Riddle (Adam Riddell)	Cox & Co.	London–Honduras	RS; large repair 1828

In 1829 Duckenfield sailed to Saint Helena with coal. From 1830 or so on, Duckenfield started to sail east of the Cape of Good Hope under a license from the British East India Company (EIC). She sailed to Van Diemen's Land and New South Wales on 12 February 1831.

On 5 March 1831 West India was wrecked on the Bonavista Reef (Cape Verde Islands). Duckenfield rescued the crew. West India was on a voyage from Liverpool, Lancashire to the Cape of Good Hope and Mauritius.

Duckenfield left Sydney on 7 August 1831 and arrived at Hobart on 17 August. From Van Diemen's Land Duckenfield sailed back to Britain via Bengal and arrived in London on 22 September 1833. She brought with her a Tasmanian devil, a gift to the Surrey Zoological Society.

== Fate ==
Lloyd's Register for 1835 showed Duckenfield's owner and master as Mosey, and her trade as London–Quebec. Her crew abandoned Duckenfield on 1 December 1835 in the Atlantic Ocean. Constitution rescued her ten surviving crew. Duckenfield had been coming back to Britain from Miramichi, New Brunswick, when she became water-logged. By the time Constitution arrived the master, mate, and three crew members had already died, and three of the survivors were in a dying state. Another report provided more detail. It stated that the master (Jackson), mate, two seamen, and a boy had died of starvation. Six of the survivors went aboard Priam, and four went on board Constitution.
