= Osbourne Store, Jamaica =

Settlement in Jamaica

Coordinates: 17.9684°N 77.3397°W

Location of Osbourne Store in Jamaica

Osbourne Store is a settlement in Jamaica. It had a population of 3932 as of 2009.
