= Grange Hill, Jamaica =

Settlement in Jamaica

Coordinates: 18.370°N 78.205°W

Location of Grange Hill in Jamaica

Grange Hill is a settlement in Jamaica, located in the parish of Westmoreland. It has a population of 7,190 as of 2009. It is the birthplace of Reggae legend Peter Tosh.
