= Spalding, Jamaica =

Spalding
- Village
- Location within Jamaica Location within the Caribbean
- Coordinates: 18.1577°N 77.4573°W
- Country: Jamaica
- Parish: Manchester and Clarendon

Population (2011)
  - Village: 4,373 (Manchester)
- 2,147 (Clarendon)
- Climate: Aw

Spalding (also spelled Spaldings) is a village in Jamaica, located in the parish of Clarendon. Despite being located in Clarendon, the Manchester police force is responsible for the city. There is an eponymous post office, Spalding Post Office, that was relocated in 2021 to Main Street in Spalding.

== History ==
=== Natural disasters ===
In 2021, the National Works Agency of Jamaica determined that a landslide blocked the main road from Spalding to Cave Valley.

=== Crime ===
In 2019, a bus driver and a police officer got into a shootout after a standoff between the two; National Security Minister Horace Chang commented on the incident, stating that the officer "had no choice but to use his firearm". In 2023, a 2-week long state of emergency was declared in Clarendon Parish, affecting Spalding; police activity there was increased following reports of crimes like robbery and breaking and entering.
