= Riversdale, Jamaica =

Settlement in Jamaica

Coordinates: 18.149°N 76.970°W

Location of Riversdale in Jamaica

Riversdale is a settlement in Jamaica. It has a population of 4,408 as of 2009.
