= Paynes Town, Saint Elizabeth, Jamaica =

Settlement in Jamaica

Coordinates: 18.294°N 78.336°W

Location of Paynes Town in Jamaica

Paynes Town is a settlement in Jamaica.
