= Natty King =

Jamaican roots reggae artist

Natty King (born Kevin Christopher Roberts; 1977) is a Jamaican roots reggae artist. He is known for the singles "Mr.Greedy" and "No Guns To Town", both from the 2003 No Guns To Town album. After a short break in his career, King released the 2020 single "JOE". In early January 2022, the roots reggae musician released his second album Rebellution featuring new anthems like: "Trees", "Early Morning" and the title-song of the album "Rebellution".

== Life and work ==
Born in Jamaica, King grew up in the countryside in Saint Thomas Parish in the southeast of Jamaica. He is the father of four children.

He rose to prominence in the early 2000s. He landed his first hit with the DJ Trinity-produced song "Mr. Greedy", which reached # 1 on the Jamaican charts. His next single "No Guns To Town" debuted at # 1 of the video charts there. After success in Jamaica, he toured through the United States and in Europe in 2003, where he performed at the festivals Rototom Sunsplash (at that time held in Italy, but now in Spain) and the Uppsala Reggae Festival in Sweden.

== Music style ==
King makes roots reggae with lyrics that predominantly deal with religion (Rastafari), and environmental policy act (Consciousness). His idols are The Wailers, Burning Spear and Luciano.

== Awards ==
- 2003: International Reggae and Word Music Award; category: Best Rural Artist
- 2003: Jamaica Federation Music Award; category: Best New Singer

== Discography ==
=== Albums ===
- 2003 - No Guns To Town Insight Records
- 2009 - Trodding
- 2010 - Born To Be Free DHF Records; production: House of Riddim
- 2022 - Rebellution Wellowell Production; production: House of Riddim, Natty King

=== Singles ===
year	title	Chart positions	album
2002	"Mr. Greedy"	#1	No Guns To Town
2003	"No Guns To Town"		No Guns To Town
2009	"Fyah Bed"		Born To Be Free
2009	"Blaze The Chillum"		
