= Albert Town, Jamaica =

Albert Town
- Town
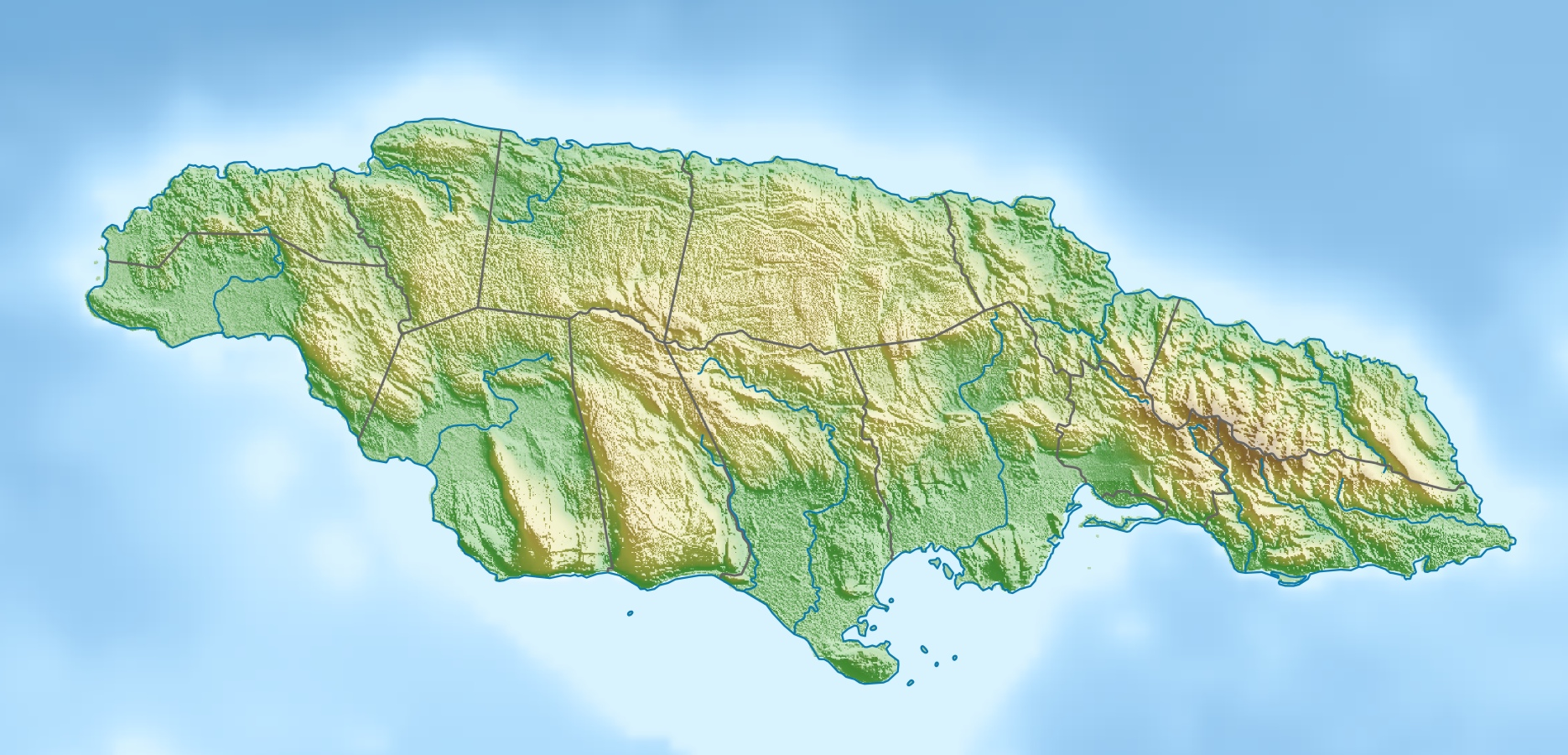
- Location within Jamaica
- Coordinates: 18°17′45″N 77°32′29″W
- Country: Jamaica
- Parish: Trelawny

Population (1991)
  - Total: 3,389
  - Estimate (2010): 3,336
- Time zone: UTC-05:00 (EST)

Albert Town is a town in the parish of Trelawny in Jamaica.
