= Barking Lodge =

- Village
- Location within Jamaica
- Coordinates: 17.8937754°N 76.2789676°W
- Country: Jamaica
- Parish: St. Thomas

Barking Lodge is a small village in the parish of Saint Thomas close to the south-east coast of Jamaica.

== History ==
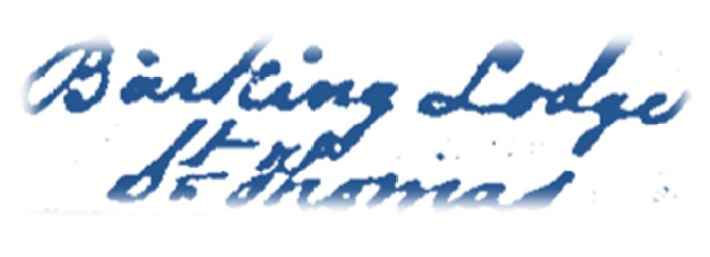
Barking Lodge, St. Thomas in the East, Jamaica (taken from a birth entry transcription by registrar W. Tilly, 1895)

Barking Lodge was once a small sugar estate spanning 350 acres (1.4 km^{2}) and worked by 150 slaves at the time of emancipation when the property belonged to Philip Forsyth and the heirs of Robert Lindsay, having been owned in 1811 by the heirs of Ambrose S. Carter.

Ambrose S. Carter appears to have first settled the estate in the 1770s. Upon his death in the early 1790s, the plantation may have descended to the Forsyth and Lindsay families into whom Carter's daughters had married whilst another daughter made union with the Dickinson family. Ambrose Carter was latterly married to the owner of Newmarket plantation. Other Carters of the period became proprietors of the Essex and Wilmington estates whilst a family of Carters settled at Bath and one Carter married into the Worsfold family. It is not apparent how these Carters may have been related. The prevalence of the name Carter in this quarter of St Thomas may be attributed to the Carters' slaveholding. The names Carter, Forsyth and Lindsay are those native to Barking Lodge.

When sugar production was abandoned, in 1847 Barking Lodge amalgamated with the nearby properties of Unity and Airy Mount under the ownership of Alexander Barclay. Maps suggest the geography and layout of the village to have remained unchanged since this time and it is possible to identify the site of the former sugar works on Unity Road and the site of the overseer's house on Crockett Hill whilst the former slave village was located to the west and within the boundary of Crockett Hill.

== Controversy ==
Alexander Barclay came to Jamaica from England in 1805 and authored A Practical View of the Present State of Slavery in the West Indies, an apologia for slavery. Barclay led a notable public life, serving as Custos and Assemblyman for St. Thomas parish, then known as St. Thomas-in-the-East, but continues to spark controversy. When the global financial institution Barclays Bank was accused of having historical links with the slave trade by which the firm profited, Alexander Barclay was presumed to be one of the slave-holding Barclays who had founded the company. Though Barclays refute those accusations and claim categorically that there is no connection, members of the black community in America angrily protested in 2007 at the bank's sponsorship of the New Jersey Nets basketball arena located in the Brooklyn area, largely populated by Afro-Americans.
