= Morant Bay High School =

- Schola Superior Sinus Morantensis
- Morant Bay High School Logo

Location
- Morant Bay, St Thomas, Jamaica; Jamaica; 17.8843°N 76.4032°W

Information
- School type: High School / Secondary
- Motto: Carpe Diem (Seize the Opportunity)
- Religious affiliation: Methodist
- Denomination: Methodist Institute
- Established: January 1961
- Founder: Mr. Winston Clarke
- Sister school: Excelsior High School (Jamaica)
- School district: Highbury Rd.
- Local authority: Ministry of Education & Youth (JM)
- School number: +1 (876) 479-0367
- Chairman: Bishop Christine Gooden-Benguche
- Principal: Kerry-Ann Coombs (acting)
- Chaplain: Reverend Buchanan
- Faculty: 10
- FORM# M, O, R, A, N & T. e.g 4M: 1 - 6th Forms
- Gender: Co-Ed
- Age range: 11-18
- Enrollment: 1307 (2024-2025)
- Sixth form students: 165 (2024-2025)
  - {{{other_grade_label}}}: Grades 12 and 13
- Classes: 38
- Average class size: 34.395
- Student to teacher ratio: 1 : 35
- Language: English French Spanish
- Hours in school day: 7hr 10m
- Campuses: 1
- Houses: Parkins; Hayden; Jackson; Jones
- Student Union/Association: Students Council Body
- Colors: Green and White
- Athletics: Sports Day
- Sports: football, netball, track and field
- Mascot: Panther
- Nickname: MBHS
- National ranking: 14th (88%) (2014)
- Feeder schools: Lyssons Primary
- Graduates: 210+
- Alumni: The Morant Bay High Alumni Association
- Alumni name: Morant Bay High School’s Alumni Association
- Website: https://morantbayhigh.com/v2/
- Last updated: 15/8/2025

Morant Bay High School in Morant Bay, St Thomas, Jamaica was founded in 1961.

At the time of its opening, St Thomas was the last Jamaican parish without a high school.

The original site was situated on seven or eight acres of land bought from the Methodist Church. An old manse on the site was the first school building with sixty one students attending on the first day of opening in January 1961.

(accurate as of 8/2025)

== Principals ==
- William Hayden Middleton 1961 - 1966
- Stanlie Parkins 1966 - 1988
- Howard Jackson 1988 - 1990
- Lebert Jones
- Grace Spence
- Valrie Marshall-Lodge 1991 - 2009
- Mohan Kumar (acting) 2010 - 2014
- Dalton Shaw 2014 - 2020 & 2020/21
- Lorveen Bell-Coates (acting) 2015
- Alice Kumar (acting) 2015 - 2017
- Marsha Ford-Bryan (acting) 2021 - 2023
- Alicia King (acting) Sept 2023- Dec 2023
- Kerry-Ann Coombs (acting) 2024–present
