= Seaforth, Jamaica =

Settlement

Coordinates: 17.930°N 76.450°W

Location of Seaforth in Jamaica

Seaforth is a settlement in Jamaica. It has a population of 4,548 as of the 2009 Jamaican census.
