= Henry Arthur Campbell =

- Born: Henry Arthur Campbell; 24 June 1873; Gordon Town, St Andrew, Jamaica
- Died: 6 June 1953; Kingston, Jamaica
- Occupation(s): Chief Electrical Engineer, Jamaica Public Service Co. Ltd.

Henry Arthur Campbell MIEE (24 June 1873 to 6 June 1953) was a Jamaican electrical engineer and long-serving employee and Chief Engineer of the Jamaican public utility.

== Education and career ==
Henry was tutored privately and at Church of England grammar schools in his early years, before apprenticing as an electrical engineer with the Jamaica Electric Light and Power Co. Ltd. beginning in 1890.

He notably contributed to the establishment and maintenance of an electric tram system in Kingston, Jamaica, and was recognized by the British Admiralty for having "rendered invaluable services" during both World War I and World War II.

He worked for over sixty years with the Jamaica Public Service Co. Ltd., from 1890 until after 1953, though in his latter years in the role of a consultant.

He rose to head several committees and clubs with the company, during his time there, including membership in the Apprenticeship Committee, chairman of the managing committee of the company's employee's thrift club, and vice-chairman of the company's mutual aid society.

He became an associate member of the Institution of Electrical Engineers in 1928, and later a member in 1932.

== Masonry ==
Campbell was heavily involved in masonry throughout his life and career. Among his masonic achievements were:

- Director, Masonic Benevolence Association
- Past Deputy District Grand Master of Scottish Free Masons in Jamaica
- Past Preceptors of Kingston Templars
- Past Principal Z. Holy Royal Arch Chapter
- Past Most Wise Sovereign, Kingston Rose Croix Chapter
- Past Grand Director of Ceremonies of the Grand Lodge of Scotland
- Past Master Mark Mason
- Past Priory Knights of Malta
- Past Worshipful Master St. John Masonic Lodge, S.C.
