= Kintyre, Jamaica =

Kintyre
- Urban squatter neighbourhood
- Location within Jamaica
- Coordinates: 18.0133°N 76.7386°W
- Country: Jamaica
- Parish: Saint Andrew

Kintyre is a district located in St. Andrew parish, Jamaica, on the side of a mountain immediately east of the Hope River, beyond Papine. It is accessible only via a driving bridge.
