= Wakefield, Jamaica =

Settlement in Jamaica

Coordinates: 18.414°N 77.723°W

Location of Wakefield in Jamaica

Wakefield is a settlement in Jamaica. It has a population of 2,694 as of 2009.
