= Point Hill, Jamaica =

Settlement in Jamaica

Coordinates: 18.087°N 77.104°W

Location of Point Hill in Jamaica

Point Hill is a settlement in Jamaica. It has a population of 5,766 as of 2009.
