= Dalvey, Jamaica =

Settlement in Jamaica

Coordinates: 17.918°N 76.185°W

Location of Dalvey in Jamaica

Dalvey is a settlement in Saint Thomas Parish, Jamaica.
