= White Hall, Saint Elizabeth, Jamaica =

Settlement in Jamaica

Coordinates: 18.092°N 77.849°W

Location of White Hall in Jamaica

White Hall is a settlement in Jamaica.

White Hall is a place with a very small population in the state/region of Saint Elizabeth, Jamaica which is located in the Caribbean. Cities, towns and places near White Hall include Middle Quarters, Holland, Mount Solus, and Giddy Hall.

The closest major cities include Montego Bay, Kingston, Santiago de Cuba, Las Tunas, and Holguin.
