= Trinity Ville, Jamaica =

Settlement in Jamaica

Coordinates: 17.952°N 76.521°W

Location of Trinity Ville in Jamaica

Trinity Ville is a settlement in Jamaica. It has a population of 2,894 as of 2009.
