= Bath, Jamaica =

Human settlement in Jamaica

Coordinates: 17.94820°N 76.34916°W

Location of Bath in Jamaica

Bath is a settlement in south-east Jamaica. It is named after the British city of the same name. Bath Fountain and Bath Botanical Gardens are located in the town of Bath.

== History ==
=== Bath Fountains ===
According to legend the baths were discovered in the 17th century by a runaway slave suffering from ulcers on his leg. He stumbled across the spring and washed his wounded limb in the water. He noticed the next day that his leg began to rapidly heal. News of the healing fountain spread and soon the spring (then named "The Bath of St Thomas the Apostle") attracted visitors from all over Jamaica. In 1699 Colonel Stanton (the owner of the land on which the spring stood) sold the 1,130 acre estate to the Government of Jamaica. The Government developed the fountain and built a hospital on the site offering free treatment using the magical waters. Guest houses sprang up nearby and many wealthy merchants built homes here, establishing Bath as a fashionable spa town. Over the years the spa fell out of favor and has fallen into a state of disrepair.

=== Bath Botanical Gardens ===
The Bath Botanical Gardens were established in 1779 through a Statute of the Jamaican House of Assembly. The gardens were established to give visitors to the Bath Mineral Spa a tranquil environment to relax in. These are the second oldest botanical gardens in the Western Hemisphere, being established 14 years after the botanical gardens on the island of St. Vincent. Many foreign plants were planted in the Bath Botanical Gardens when they were first introduced in Jamaica, including ackee, breadfruit and otaheite apples. It is believed that Jamaica's first breadfruit trees were brought to Bath by Captain Bligh in 1793 and that several other exotic species were introduced in 1782 following the capture of a French vessel by Admiral Rodney.
