= Orange Bay (Hanover Parish) =

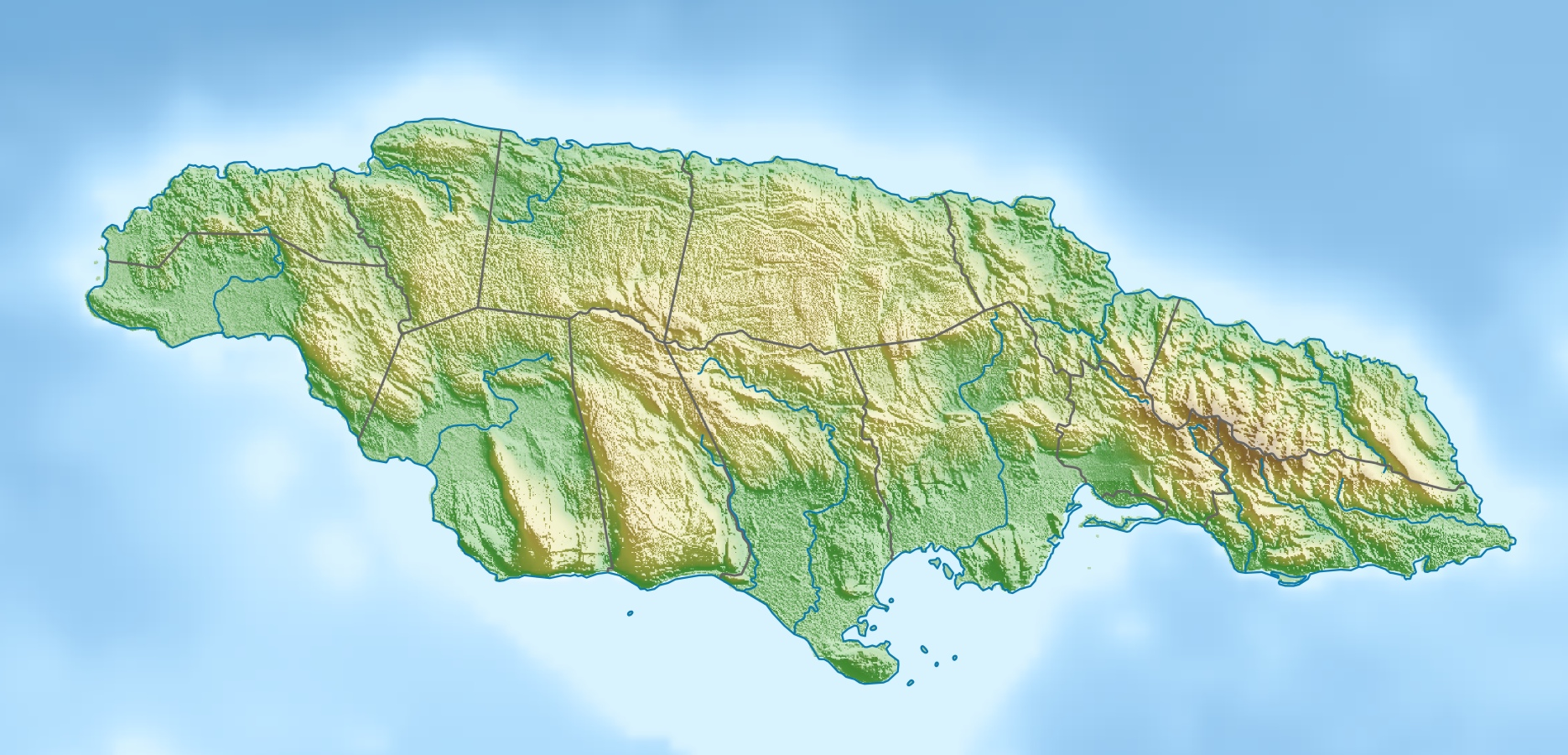
- Location in Jamaica
- Location: Hanover Parish, Jamaica
- Coordinates: 18.3669076°N 78.3139372°W

Orange Bay is a small bay in Hanover Parish, Jamaica to the north of the resort town of Negril.
