= Yallahs =

- City
- Location within Jamaica
- Coordinates: 17.8832195°N 76.5947914°W
- Country: Jamaica
- County: Surrey
- Parish: St Thomas
- Founded: 1671

Government
  - Councillor: Maud Turgott
  - Mayor: Hanif Brown Sr.
  - Member of Parliament: James Robertson

Population
  - City: 7 641
  - Metro: 10 274
- Time zone: UTC-5 (EST)
- Postal code: JMBTS16
- Area code: +1876

Yallahs is a town on the southeastern coast of Jamaica in the parish of St Thomas, home to 10,274 residents. The town, which was documented as “Yealoth” in a 1662 census, may have derived its name from Captain Yallahs, a privateer from 1671, or vice versa. Another theory suggests that the name Yallahs could have originated from the Spanish word ‘yalos’, meaning ‘frost’, as the high white cliffs in the area might give the impression of frost.

In 1822, Yallahs was chosen as the site for the first Baptist church in Jamaica. Despite initial setbacks, Rev. Joshua Tinson established both a church and a school in 1828. The Yallahs River, a vital source of fresh water for the neighboring City of Kingston and Saint Andrew Parish, supplies residents via the Yallahs Pipeline. The city, which hosts a variety of Christian denominations, also contributes to the mining industry through gravel extraction along the Yallahs River bank. The St. Thomas Parish Council, located in the parish’s capital town, Morant Bay, governs the town.

== Geography ==
The town of Yallahs is located in the southwestern section of the parish of St. Thomas in Jamaica. It is made up of districts, communities and villages surrounding the Yallahs River Basin including:

West Of The River

- Sun Valley
- Albion Estate
- East Albion (North Of Albion Estate)

East Of The River

- Poor Man's Corner
- Yallahs Housing Scheme 1
- Yallahs Housing Scheme 2
- Yallahs Housing Scheme 3
- Heartese
- Norris
- Hampstead
- Logwood
- Montpellier
- Newland District
- Lloyd's Pen
- Southaven
- Knightsville
- Baptist
- Pondside (North Of The Yallahs Pond)
- Lowden Hill (North Of The Yallahs Pond)
