= Easington, Jamaica =

Settlement in Jamaica

Coordinates: 17.918°N 76.578°W

Location of Easington in Jamaica

Easington is a settlement in Jamaica.
