= Hopewell, Hanover =

Settlement and fishing village in Jamaica

Coordinates: 18°27′N 78°01′W

Hopewell is a settlement and fishing village in Hanover Parish, Jamaica, located 15 kilometres west of Montego Bay. It is the location of Round Hill Hotel and Villas, a historic beachfront resort. A small fleet of fishing boats operates from the beach to the west of the center of town.

== Old Steamer Beach ==
Hopewell is the location of Old Steamer Beach, west of the main center of the parish. The skeleton of the U.S.S. Caribou, a wood hull steamer dating from 1887 that washed off its mooring from Mobay, is still located on the beach. The ship's hull and timber remains sat just under the low tide waterline. The remains of the boiler stands a few feet above the water.

Hopewell is a scenic seaside town located in the Parish of Hanover. Entrance to the districts of Camp, Mcquary, Lookout, Bamboo. Located nearby is Round Hill Resort and Round Hill Estate.
