= Airy Castle =

Village in Jamaica

Coordinates: 17°55′N 76°20′W

Airy Castle is a village in the Jamaican parish of Saint Thomas.
