= Saint Andrew Parish, Jamaica =

Parish of Jamaica

Saint Andrew Sint Anju
- Parish
- Saint Andrew in Jamaica
- Country: Jamaica
- County: Surrey
- Capital: Half Way Tree
- Other towns: Stony Hill, Golden Spring, Constant Spring, Lawrence Tavern, August Town, Gordon Town, Irish Town, Mavis Bank, Bull Bay

Area
  - Total: 455 km^{2} (176 sq mi)
  - Rank: 12

Population (2022)
  - Total: 583,718
  - Density: 1,280/km^{2} (3,320/sq mi)

Saint Andrew (Jamaican Patois: Sint Anju) is a parish, situated in the southeast of Jamaica in the county of Surrey. It lies north, west and east of Kingston, and stretches into the Blue Mountains. As of the 2022 census, it had a population of 583,718, the highest of any of the parishes in Jamaica.

George William Gordon (d. 1865), one of Jamaica's seven National Heroes, was born in this parish.

It contains many attractions, historical sites, famous residents, and the country's financial capital.

The parish has a rich musical tradition, with numerous well-known musicians and developing popular types of Jamaican music. The Studio One studio founded by Clement "Coxsone" Dodd is in Saint Andrew. Mavado, Sean Paul, Buju Banton, Elephant Man, The Mighty Diamonds, Monty Alexander, Beres Hammond, Lady Saw, Sugar Minott, Bounty Killer, Mr. Vegas, Richie Spice are some of the parish's current musician residents.

The area of Trenchtown became famous for such residents as The Wailers (Bunny Wailer, Peter Tosh and Bob Marley), and Toots Hibbert, who created reggae music. Waterhouse is another hometown to many musicians, including Keith Hudson, King Tubby's, U Roy, Sir Jammy's, Black Uhuru, Dennis "Senitor" Allen, Early B. Super Cat, Shabba, and Beenie Man. It is also the home of Olympic gold medalist, Shelly-Ann Fraser-Pryce.

The residence built in 1881 by George Stiebel, Jamaica's first Afro-European or Mulatto millionaire, is known as Devon House. Steibel gained his wealth in Venezuela and returned to Jamaica. He was appointed as the Custos, a high civic post, of Saint Andrew. His residence has been restored and is operated as a house museum; it is open to the public for tours and special events. Concessions include a Devon House ice cream shop.

The grounds of the Hope Estate, built in the 17th century, now support Hope Gardens (Royal Botanical Gardens), one of the oldest in the Western Hemisphere. The University of the West Indies is located on the estate and uses some of the historic buildings. Part of the navigable aqueduct is still intact.

Vale Royal, the residence of the Prime Minister, and King's House, the Governor General's residence, are significant historic buildings.

The area of Norbrook was once the plantation of George William Gordon. The Bob Marley Museum is located in a mansion on Hope Road that was once owned by businessman Chris Blackwell. It is now open for guided tours.

== Geography ==
St. Andrew was one of the first parishes to be established by law in 1867. Before being established, it was known as Liguanea.

St Andrew is located at 18°01′N 76°54′W and covers an area of 455 km^{2} (176 sq mi). The parish lies just north of Kingston, bounded in the west by St. Catherine, north by St. Mary, northeast by Portland along the Blue Mountain range, and east by St. Thomas. In 1923, the parishes of St Andrew and Kingston were administratively merged to form the Kingston and St Andrew Corporation (KSAC), with a single elected council and a mayor. Parts of the geographic area of Saint Andrew is often referred to as the "Corporate Area, town, Kingston Metropolitan area, uptown Kingston, Kingston 2-20". The current mayor of KSAC is Delroy Williams. St Andrew has one major river, that being the Hope River at 19.6 Kilometres.

Cross Roads, New Kingston, Half-Way-Tree, Matilda's Corner, and Constant Spring are important commercial centres in St. Andrew, but may be regarded as suburbs of Kingston. Coronation Market bordering both Saint Andrew and Kingston, is one of the largest, if not the largest outdoor market in this part of the island provides a venue for farmers throughout Jamaica. West St. Andrew, however, is a populous residential area. Total population of the parish was 583,718 in 2022.

== Notable people ==
- Alexander Aikman (1755-1838) King's Printer, member House of Assembly
- Monty Alexander
- Maurice Ashley, Chess grandmaster hall-of-famer
- Assassin(dj)/ Agent Sasco(dj)
- Buju Banton, Jamaican musician
- Alexander Bedward (1859-1930)
- Beenie Man
- Lloyd Brevett OD (1931 –2012), double bassist, songwriter, and a founding member of The Skatalites, and the uncle of The Melodians member, Tony Brevett.
- Elephant Man
- Lady Colin Campbell, author and socialite
- Linford Christie, British athlete
- Desmond Dekker (aka Desmond Dacres), reggae ska singer
- Clement Dodd, Studio One music studio
- Brian Fowler, racing driver
- Ricardo Gardner
- Di Genius
- Andre Gordon, actor and producer
- Fitzroy Gordon, Jamaican-Canadian radio executive and broadcaster
- George William Gordon, Jamaican national hero, businessman, and politician
- Gyptian, musician
- Beverly Hall, educational administrator
- Dorothy Henriques-Wells (1926–2018), painter and art teacher
- Euan Lucie-Smith, WWI army officer of mixed heritage
- Bob Marley, Trenchtown, Hope Road, Bull Bay
- Mavado, Jamaican DJ
- Judy Mowatt
- Nyla, singer
- Augustus Pablo, Jamaican musician
- Sean Paul, Jamaican musician
- Lee "Scratch" Perry
- Hermine E. Ricketts (1956–2019), Jamaican-born American architect
- Sanchez
- Shaggy, Jamaican musician
- Sizzla
- Richie Spice
- The Wailers
- U Roy
- Leslyn Lewis

== Economy ==
Much of the parish is devoted to agriculture. Its principal products include coffee, mangoes, cocoa, peas, beans, sugarcane, cattle, dairy goods, cigar and cigarette, vegetables and ground provisions. To encourage the movement of industrial plants from the business areas of Kingston, and to facilitate the establishment of new industries with local and overseas capital, the government has established an industrial estate in St. Andrew, bordering on Western Kingston. This industrial estate is over 1.2 km^{2} (300 acres) in size.

Tourism plays a major part in the economy of the parish. The major hotels in this southeastern part of the country can be found on Knutsford Boulevard, also known as The Strip. The area of New Kingston is seen as the financial capital of the island, with its large headquarters for banks and investment companies. The commercial areas, with their many malls, plazas and stores, provide employment for many in the urban area of the parish. Gypsum is found in large quantities, in eastern St. Andrew, the largest deposits being in the area of Bull Bay, a mile and a half of the coast.

At the south of Papine, several miles northeast of Kingston is the University of the West Indies, occupying 2.6 km^{2} (1.0 sq mi) of the Liguanea Plain at the foot of Long Mountain. The University of Technology, Jamaica, formerly the College of Arts, Science and Technology, is located nearby. So too is the United Theological College of the West Indies. The Edna Manley School for the Visual Arts is also located in Saint Andrew, not far from the National Stadium.

The parish of Saint Andrew also has some of the top high schools on the island. Campion College, Jamaica College, Calabar High School, Ardenne High School, Immaculate Conception High School, St Andrew High School for Girls, Holy Childhood High School, Meadowbrook High School, St. George's College, St Hugh's High School, Excelsior High School, and a campus of Kingston College, in Rollington Town, are some of those schools.

Saint Andrew forms a substantial part of the Kingston Metropolitan Area and includes much of the urban area surrounding the historic parish of Kingston. The wider Kingston area contains major commercial districts, restaurants, nightlife venues, cultural attractions and recreational facilities.

== Government and infrastructure ==
The St. Andrew Juvenile Remand Centre of the Department of Correctional Services, Jamaica is located in Stony Hill, St. Andrew Parish.

== Transportation ==
=== Road ===
The primary roads through Kingston to the rest of the island all pass through St Andrew including the A1 to Lucea, A3 to Saint Ann's Bay, A4 to Annotto Bay and B1 to Buff Bay via Newcastle. The Transport Center, located in Half-Way-Tree, Saint Andrew is a depot for public buses servicing many parts of the tri-parish area (Saint Andrew, Kingston and Saint Catherine)and the outlying areas.

=== Rail ===
The main railway line from Kingston to the rest of the island ran through western St Andrew en route to Spanish Town. It is now closed.

=== Air ===
Jamaica's 2 primary airports are Sangster International Airport located in Montego Bay, St James and Norman Manley International Airport located on the Palisadoes Peninsula in Kingston, St. Andrew.

=== Sea ===
Plumb Point Lighthouse is located at Great Plumb Point on the Palisadoes Peninsula.

== Important places ==
- The Governor General's Residence at King House
- Vale Royal, The Prime Minister's Residence,
- Modern commercial New Kingston Complex
- Bob Marley Museum
- Sabina Park
- The National Stadium
- Mico College
- Hope Garden
- Half Way Tree
- Cross Road
- Carib Theatre
- Saint Andrew Parish Church
- Emancipation Park
- Mandela Park
- May Pen Cemetery
- Strawberry Hill
- Studio One
- Trenchtown
- New Kingston
- The University of the West Indies, Mona Campus
- Jamaica House
- Edna Manley School of the Visual Arts
- Temple Hall
- New Castle

=== Towns, communities and villages ===
- Arnett Gardens
- Allman Town
- August Town (named for Emancipation Day, 1 August)
- Barbican
- Beverly Hills
- Bumper Hall
- Bull Bay
- Callaloo Bed
- Cassia Park
- Constant Spring
- Cassava Piece
- Chancery Heights
- Cherry Gardens
- Cypress Hall
- Cockburn Penn
- Cooper's Hill
- Denham Town
- Duhaney Park
- Drew's Land
- Elliston Flat
- Fletcher's Land
- Franklin Town
- Golden Spring
- Gordon Town
- Grant's Pen
- Greenwich Town
- Guava Gap
- Hannah Town
- Harbor View
- Havendale
- Independence Park
- Irish Town
- Jacks Hill
- Jungle
- Jones Town
- Kingweston
- King Wood
- Lawrence Tavern
- Manning's Hill
- Marverly
- Meadowbrook
- Mount James, Saint Andrew
- Mount Salus
- Nannyville
- New Kingston
- New Castle
- Norbrook
- Olympic Gardens
- Paine Land
- Patrick City
- Pear Hill
- Pembroke Hall
- Papine
- Queensbury
- Red Gal Ring
- Rollington Town
- Riverton City
- Rockfort
- Seaview Gardens
- Shooters Hill, Jamaica
- Six Miles
- Smoky Vale
- Stony Hill
- Strawberry Hill
- Tinson Pen
- Tivoli Gardens
- Trenchtown
- Tower Hill
- Temple Hall
- Unity
- Vineyard Town
- Washington Garden
- Waterhouse
- Warekia Hill
- Whitehall
- Wilton Garden
- Ziadie Gardens
