= Constant Spring, Jamaica =

Constant Spring
- Community
- Location within Jamaica
- Coordinates: 18°03′04.8″N 76°47′35.9″W
- Country: Jamaica
- City: Kingston
- Parish: St Andrew
- Established: Q
- Time zone: UTC-5 (EST)

Constant Spring is a residential neighbourhood in the north of Kingston, Jamaica.

== Constant Spring plantation ==
Constant Spring plantation was one of the Regimental Plantations. It was developed by Lt.-Colonel Henry Archibold during the military occupation following the English invasion of Jamaica. Commander William Brayne described it as "one of the best plantations in the island".

== Popular culture ==
Constant Spring is referred to in a string of mid-1970s songs, Trinity's "Three Piece Suit", Lee Perry and Junior Dread's "Sufferer's Heights", and Althea and Donna's "Uptown Top Ranking". Later, it is referenced in Yellowman's "Mr. Chin".
