= Stony Hill, Jamaica =

Human settlement in Jamaica

Coordinates: 18.079°N 76.783°W

Location of Stony Hill in Jamaica

Stony Hill is a residential neighbourhood in St. Andrew Parish, Surrey County, on the northern outskirts of Kingston, Jamaica. As of 2009 it had a population of 8,388. In 2015 it was reported to have grown to 9,983 people.

The St. Andrew Juvenile Remand Centre of the Department of Correctional Services, Jamaica is located in Stony Hill.
