= Sandy Bay, Jamaica =

Sandy Bay
- Seaside Town
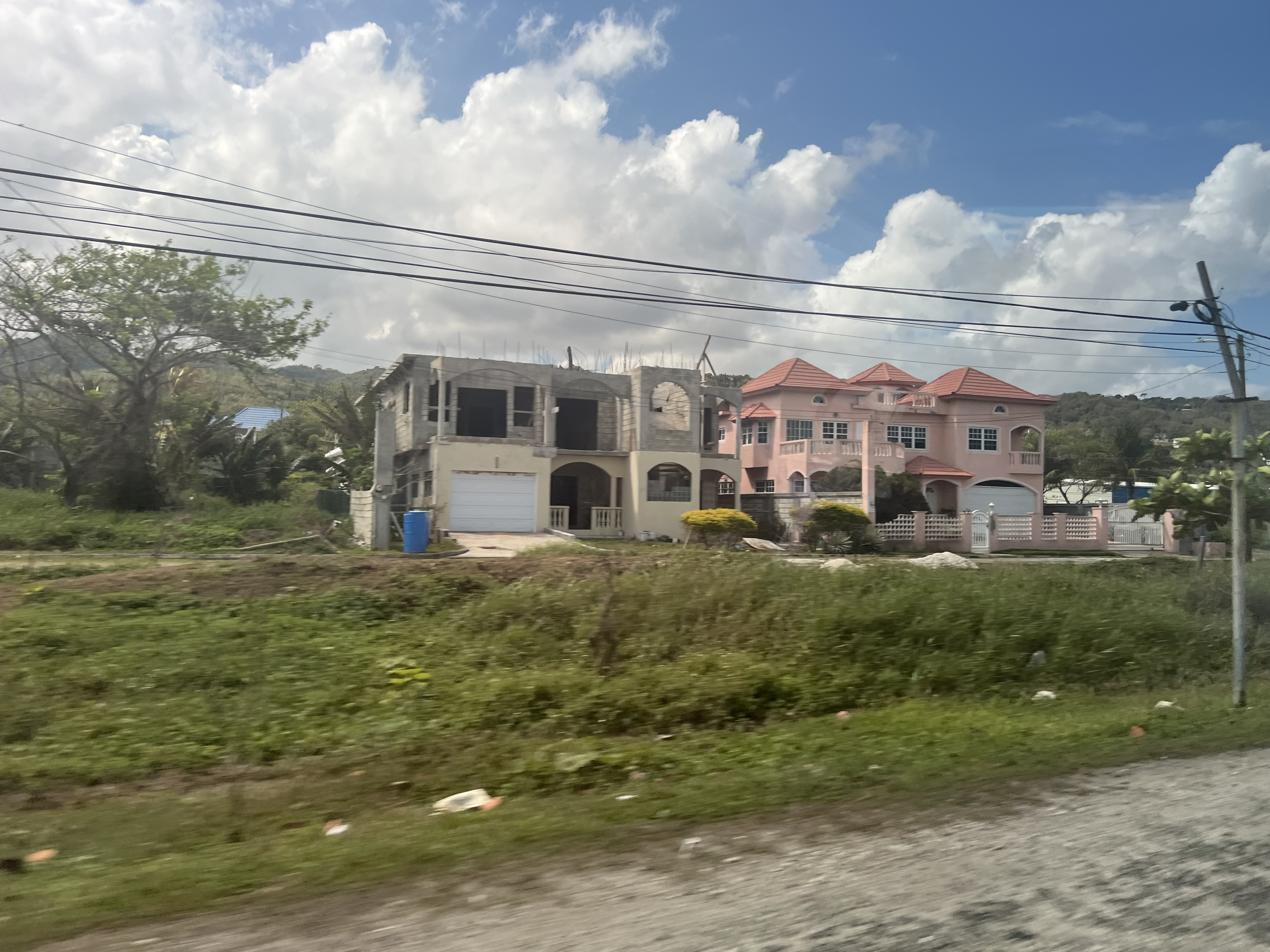
- Houses in Tryall Gardens, community located in Sandy Bay

- Location within Jamaica
- Coordinates: 18.4486317°N 78.0744696°W
- Country: Jamaica
- Parish: Hanover

Sandy Bay, Jamaica is a seaside town in western Jamaica. There are several churches such as the Seventh-day Adventist Church, the Baptist Church, the Methodist Church, and the Church of God.

Sandy Bay was also home to a Jockey International Factory which was a major employer for the town. They have since left to find cheaper labour.

Sandy Bay Primary and Junior High School (previously Sandy Bay All Age) provides education for the children of Sandy Bay and neighboring Mt. Pelier. Mrs. Trenfield is the Principal of the school with Juliet Murray serving as Vice Principal. Students are housed in the old building on the right side of the campus and in the Andrew Kennedy Building on the left, completed in the 1990s. Parts of the movie Cool Runnings was filmed on the campus.
