= Havendale =

- Suburb
- Location within Jamaica
- Coordinates: 18.0500°N 76.8083°W
- Country: Jamaica
- City: Kingston

Havendale is a suburban, neighborhood located in Kingston, Jamaica.
