= Duckenfield, Jamaica =

Duckenfield
- Village
- Location within Jamaica
- Coordinates: 17.9170027°N 76.2568331°W
- Country: Jamaica
- Parish: St Thomas
- Time zone: UTC-5 (EST)

Duckenfield, Jamaica is a village in St Thomas, in south-east Jamaica. It is named after the sugar plantation on which it is located. It is a very poor community, but it has grown substantially in recent years. There were plans to build an international airport in the vicinity in order to open the eastern end of the island to tourism, but these have since been shelved.

The economy of Duckenfield is dominated by the nearby sugar estate and factory which are the only major employers in the vicinity. Any change in the fortunes of the sugar industry has an immediate and dramatic effect. The St. Thomas Parish sugar mill Golden Grove closed in July 2019.

== Climate ==
Climate data for Duckenfield, Jamaica
Month	Jan	Feb	Mar	Apr	May	Jun	Jul	Aug	Sep	Oct	Nov	Dec	Year
Mean daily maximum °C (°F)	28.7 (83.7)	28.9 (84.0)	29.1 (84.4)	30.1 (86.2)	30.7 (87.3)	31.3 (88.3)	31.9 (89.4)	31.8 (89.2)	31.2 (88.2)	30.8 (87.4)	30.0 (86.0)	29.2 (84.6)	30.3 (86.5)
Mean daily minimum °C (°F)	21.2 (70.2)	20.7 (69.3)	21.0 (69.8)	21.5 (70.7)	22.8 (73.0)	23.8 (74.8)	24.2 (75.6)	23.3 (73.9)	23.1 (73.6)	22.4 (72.3)	22.3 (72.1)	21.9 (71.4)	22.4 (72.3)
Average precipitation mm (inches)	92 (3.6)	81 (3.2)	64 (2.5)	94 (3.7)	246 (9.7)	177 (7.0)	110 (4.3)	178 (7.0)	227 (8.9)	306 (12.0)	237 (9.3)	158 (6.2)	1,970 (77.6)
Average relative humidity (%) (at 13:00)	68	67	70	67	70	72	71	67	73	75	75	73	71
Mean monthly sunshine hours	220.1	214.7	232.5	240.0	220.1	219.0	241.8	235.6	204.0	207.7	201.0	195.3	2,631.8
Mean daily sunshine hours	7.1	7.6	7.5	8.0	7.1	7.3	7.8	7.6	6.8	6.7	6.7	6.3	7.2
Source: Meteorological Service (Jamaica)

== Amenities ==
There are two primary schools, Duckenfield Primary and Dalvey Primary. a hospital and a post office.

== See also ==
- List of cities and towns in Jamaica
