= Lucea, Jamaica =

City in Jamaica

Coordinates: 18°27′N 78°11′W

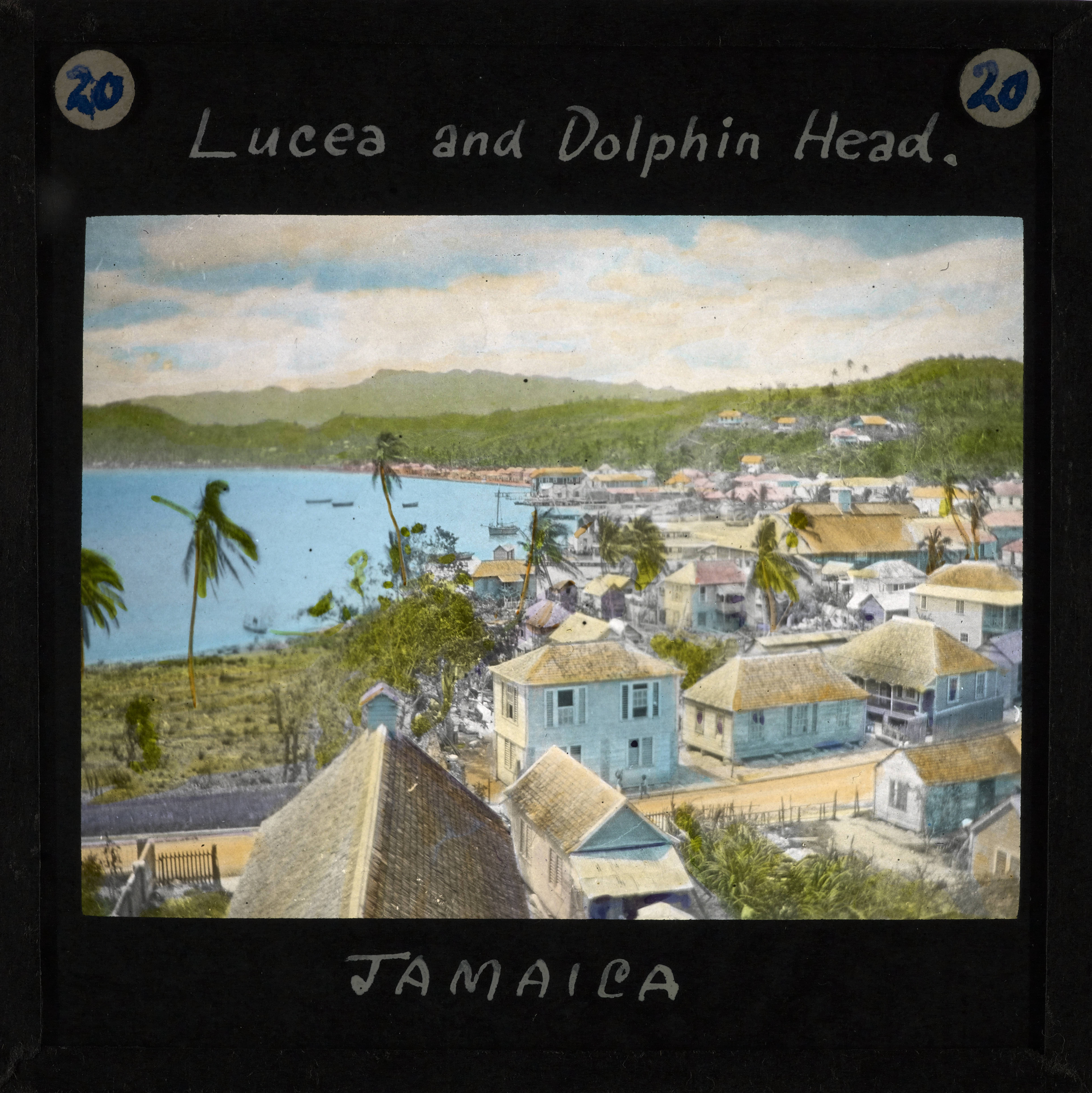
Lucea and Dolphin Head, early 20th century

Lucea (Jamaican Creole: Luusi) is a coastal town in Jamaica and the capital of the parish of Hanover.

== History ==
Hanover, Jamaica's second smallest parish was founded on 12 November 1723 with Lucea as the capital and main city. From the middle of the 18th century, the farmers of Hanover provided the rest of Jamaica with most of its produce but mainly exported banana and logwood, which is used to make dyes.

Fort Charlotte in Lucea was built in 1761. Alongside the fort is an impressive Georgian brick structure known as The Barracks, which was built in 1843 to provide shelter to the soldiers stationed there.

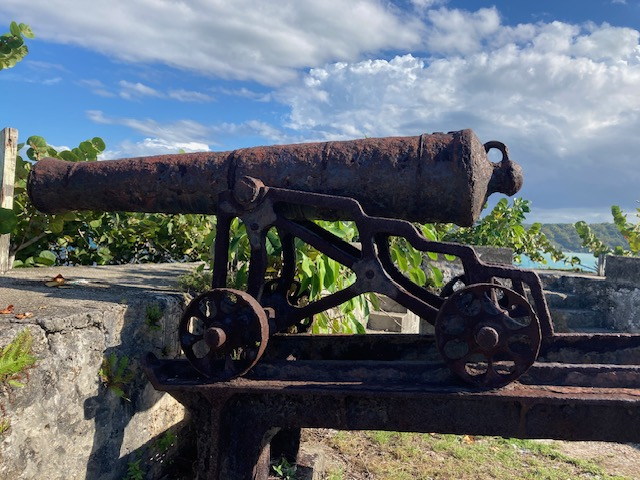
Fort Charlotte

In the early 20th century The Barracks became the educational center for the town and has now been transformed to become part of the Rusea's High School complex. In 1982 Rusea's High School was merged with the Hanover Secondary School and is still known as the Rusea's High School (Fort Charlotte). In January 2019 the school was still open and open-air lessons took place inside the fort.

The parish has three small waterfalls, several coves, such as the Davis Cove, named after a prominent Hanover family, along its coastline and large caves.

The still fully functional Lucea clock tower was built in 1817 and stands in the town center near the Old Lucea courthouse.

Other notable tourist attractions are Lucea's many historical sites that date back as far as the 18th century. Lucea Parish Church (the Parish Church of Hanover) is one of the oldest churches in Jamaica. Although no record of when it was first built exists the first baptism record dates back to 1725, the first burial was in 1727, and the first marriage in 1749. It is said that there is a tunnel that leads from the church to nearby Fort Charlotte, which was a safe haven in time of war. The Hanover Museum sits on the site of a prison dating back to 1776, and houses many historical artifacts significant to Hanover's history.

== Demographics ==
Lucea has a population of approximately 5,739. People of mostly African descent make up approximately 92% of population, the others being approximately 1% People of mostly European descent, 4% Asian, 2% Latin American, and all others 2%.

== Culture ==
Lucea shares the Jamaican interest in music such as reggae.

== Agriculture ==
A wide variety of vegetables and fruits are grown in the area around Lucea, such as pulses, cereals, and root vegetables. Sugar, cocoa, coffee, bananas, and rum are important exports of Jamaica. In Lucea, there is a need for domestic cultivators and rural farmers to feed the island's people and visitors. Fruits, vegetables, and flowers are also grown for local consumption. One of the staples of Lucea is the breadfruit.

A Rural Agricultural Development Authority farming project along with resident farmers have been "supplying the hotel sector on a consistent basis" and "bring vegetables to the tables of its sophisticated guests", according to The Jamaican Observer. This linkage between the tourism demands and the up-and-coming agricultural communities provides an economic opportunity for Lucea. Therefore, the local farmers mostly produce vegetables, roots and tubers (sweet potatoes and yams), some fruits and flowers (hibiscus and Bauhinia or Poor Man's Orchid). As a result, this leaves the larger crop of sugar, cocoa and coffee to the industrial plantations of Jamaica. These major agricultural industries can bring in revenues in the millions meanwhile, leaving the smaller cultivators to provide exotic vegetables for the resort chain restaurants and tourism industries.

=== Lucea Yams ===
Lucea Yams are a major product of the parish. In the post-emancipation period the formerly enslaved people in the parish began to cultivate the soft, white, delicately-flavoured yam are named for the town. In the 19th and early 20th century yams grown in the parish were exported from the port of Lucea to places like Colón and Cuba which had sizable Jamaican populations because of the thousands who had migrated to work on the Panama Canal and on sugar and banana plantations.

== Tourism ==
Lucea boasts many clubs and parks as well as the historical attractions, and museum. Lucea's most popular dance clubs that attract both tourists and local people are the 300 Club, founded in 1955, Green Dragon, and Border Line. The Tryall Golf, Tennis & Beach Club sits on a 2,200-acre (8.9 km^{2}) property outside Lucea, and is Hanover's most exclusive resort.

Lucea lies between two of Jamaica's most prominent resort cities, Negril and Montego Bay, but has yet to capitalize on the thousands of tourists that pass through. Jamaica Tourism Minister Edmund Bartlett has said he will announce plans for designating Lucea as a resort destination. Bartlett said:

The designation will give Lucea certain privileges and will also allow for us to look at the resort's planning development, which other resort towns are getting and so Lucea will be able to join Negril, Montego Bay, Ocho Rios as properly planned resort centers.

Since that statement Grand Palladium, part of a Spanish hotel firm, has erected a new 1600 unit luxury double resort called the Grand Palladium Jamaica Resort and Spa / Grand Palladium Lady Hamilton.

== Notable residents ==
- Walter Jekyll, musician and savant
- Enid Gonsalves, OD (1931–2011) educator and community developer.
- Lee "Scratch" Perry, (1936–2021), record producer, composer and singer.

== Sources ==
- "Lucea powered by antonartnetwork." Luceatown.info. 10 December 2004. Accessed 9 November 2008 https://web.archive.org/web/20180114164205/http://www.luceatown.info/
- Cummings, Mark. "Can Lucea rise to the occasion?" The Jamaican Observer 21 February 2008. Accessed 9 November 2008 http://www.jamaicaobserver.com/westernnews/html/20080220T210000-0500_132734_OBS_CAN_LUCEA_RISE_TO_THE_OCCASION_asp%5B%5D.
- DuQuesnay, Fredrick. "Historic Lucea and the Brisett family." Jamaican Family Search. Accessed 9 November 2008 http://jamaicanfamilysearch.com/Sample2?fred04.htm%5B%5D
- "Fort Charlotte, Hanover". 1 January 2005. Jamaica National Heritage Trust. Accessed 1 November 2008 https://web.archive.org/web/20081002045140/http://www.jnht.com/heritage_site.php?id=137
- Hanover Parish Information. Hanover Parish Library. Accessed 1 November 2008. https://web.archive.org/web/20050906003623/http://www.jamlib.org.jm/hanover_history.htm
- Hanover Parish Information". Hanover Parish Library. Jamaica Library Service. Accessed 9 November 2008 https://web.archive.org/web/20050906003623/http://www.jamlib.org.jm/hanover_history.htm
- "Lucea Entertainment-Venues and Players." Lucea Online. 10 December 2004. Accessed 9 November 2008 https://web.archive.org/web/20081204111100/http://www.luceaonline.com/entertainment.htm]
- Wilson, Judith. "Sandals Farming Project Impression Harvard Forum." Jamaica Observer. 3 December 2007. Accessed 26 October 2008 https://web.archive.org/web/20081018174031/http://www.jamaicaobserver.com/news/html/20071202t180000-0500_129991_obs_sandals_farming_project_impresses_harvard_forum.asp
- "The Capital Town of Hanover, A Travel & Information Website Design for Lucea Hanover." Luceatown.com. 10 December 2004. Accessed 9 November 2008 https://web.archive.org/web/20180806105307/http://luceatown.com/
