= Hanover Parish =

Parish of Jamaica

Hanover Anuova
- Parish
- Hanover in Jamaica
- Coordinates: 18.417°N 78.133°W
- Country: Jamaica
- County: Cornwall
- Capital: Lucea

Area
  - Total: 430 km^{2} (170 sq mi)

Population (2012)
  - Total: 69,874
  - Density: 160/km^{2} (420/sq mi)

Hanover (Jamaican Patois: Anuova) is a parish located on the northwestern tip of the island of Jamaica. It is a part of the county of Cornwall, bordered by St. James in the east and Westmoreland in the south. With the exception of Kingston, it is the smallest parish on the island. Hanover is the birth parish of Alexander Bustamante, labour leader, first head of government of Jamaica under universal suffrage, and one of seven Jamaican National Heroes. Its capital is Lucea.

== History ==
The region was initially under Spanish control as a colony until 1655, when Spain relinquished control to the English. Over time, parishes were formed to govern the island. The parish would go unnamed for many decades even though many of the towns existed.

Hanover was established on 12 November 1723. It is the second smallest parish in Jamaica and was established from parts of Westmoreland and St James parishes. It was named in honor of the British monarch George I, who was a member of the German House of Hanover. There had been a governmental proposal to name parish St. Sophia, after the King's mother; however, the assembly did not approve the proposal. The parish's capital town, on the other hand, has name variations: St Lusia, St. Lucia, St. Lucea and, today, Lucea. In the early colonial days, Lucea, the main town and port, was even busier than Montego Bay. By the mid-18th century, Lucea was the hub of an important sugar-growing region, and the town was prosperous as a sugar port and market centre. European Jews settled in the parish as merchants, store keepers, haberdashery, shoe makers and goldsmiths. It became a free port.

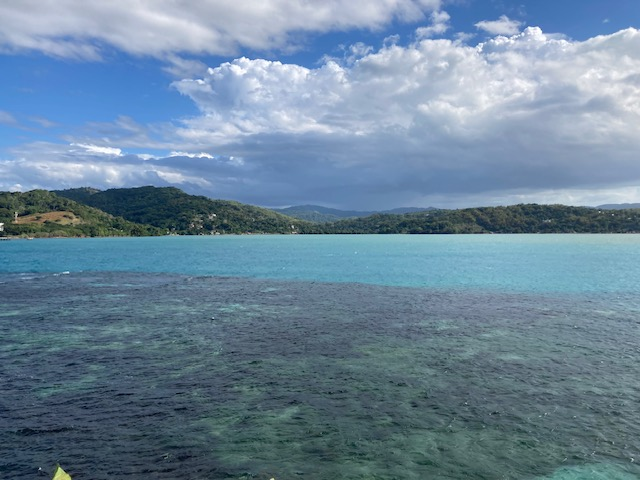
View from Fort Charlotte

After the abolition of slavery in 1834, the free people prospered, developing a variety of crops, and supplying produce to much of the rest of Jamaica. The harbor was used to export bananas until after the 1960s. A deep-water pier was built, but this has been restricted to the shipping of molasses, an important sugar product. The port was closed in 1983. The historic Fort Charlotte stands at one side of the entrance to the harbour, but was never garrisoned.

== Geography and demography ==
Hanover covers an area of 450 km^{2}. The capital town, Lucea, is located at latitude 18°25'N, longitude 78°08'W. The highest point in the parish is the Dolphin's Head, which serves as a landmark for ships at sea. The parish has a mountainous terrain; it features three small waterfalls, several coves along its coastline, such as the Davis Cove—named after a prominent Hanover family—along its coast, and large caves. A clock tower was installed in the centre of Lucea in 1817; it still stands, and is still fully functional.

The parish had an estimated 67,176 inhabitants in 1999, 5,739 of which lived in Lucea. The large majority of the population is black (92.1%), with 0.8% whites, 3.7% Asians, 2.3% Latinos, and 2.1% identifying as other.

The Great River is the officially recorded river in Hanover. Its valley has been an important agricultural region.

Other notable towns include Sandy Bay, Dias, Green Island, Hopewell and Cascade.

== Notable People; Cultural Figures ==
- Lee Scratch Perry (born Rainford Hugh Perry; 1936 – 2021) Rainford Hugh Perry, born in Kendal in the parish of Hanover, was a highly influential, world renowned record producer, singer and songwriter noted for his profoundly innovative studio techniques and production style. Perry was a pioneer in the 1970s development of dub music with his early adoption of remixing and studio effects to create new instrumental or vocal versions of existing reggae tracks. He worked with and produced for a wide variety of artists, including Bob Marley and the Wailers, Junior Murvin, the Congos, Max Romeo, the Heptones, and many more.

== Politics ==
Hanover Parish has two MPs and two constituencies; Hanover Eastern and Hanover Western.

== Commerce ==
=== Agriculture ===
Hanover is known for the production of yams, sugar cane, ginger, rice, pimento, turmeric, breadfruit and arrowroot. It is also celebrated for its fine breeds of cattle, and pigs and goats are raised.

=== Sights ===
Although Hanover is not one of Jamaica's major tourist areas, a tourist resort is situated in the village of Hopewell about 24 km (15 mi) east of Lucea. This area has several large hotels, including Round Hill and Tryall (noted for its golf course). There is also the Grand Palladium resort and spa in western Hanover and on the northern part of the Negril strip (which falls within Hanover not Westmoreland) are the Grand Lido, Couples, Riu, Sandals, Negril cabins and beaches.

Lucea Parish Church - The main structure of the Lucea Parish Church building dates back to the 18th century. It was built prior to 1725, but records at least establish it in 1725 with oldest baptism recorded. It is the oldest building in the parish of Hanover. It is said that a tunnel leads from underneath the church to nearby Fort Charlotte, which is approximately 400 m away.

Fort Charlotte - Commanding the entrance to Lucea Harbor is the well-kept 18th-century Fort Charlotte, constructed in 1745 and renamed in 1778 to honor George III's wife, Queen Charlotte. (Prior to that year, it was listed as Lucea Fort.) It was erected in defense of the harbor, and stands on a peninsula overlooking the sea channel. The War Office in Britain transferred the barracks and Fort Charlotte in 1862, as a gift to the Executive Committee of Jamaica.

== Plantations ==
- Axe and Azde
- Bachelor's Hall
- Betsy Mount
- Caldwell
- Comfort Hall
- Cousins Cove
- Cottage
- Haughton Court
- Haughton Grove
- Haughton Hall
- Haughton Tower
- Hopewell (Bucknor's)
- Prospect
- Retirement
- Rhodes Hall Estate
- Salt Spring
- Saxham
- Tryall
