= Holland Estate, Jamaica =

Sugar plantation in Saint Thomas Parish, Jamaica

Coordinates: 17°56′33.73″N 76°14′34.94″W

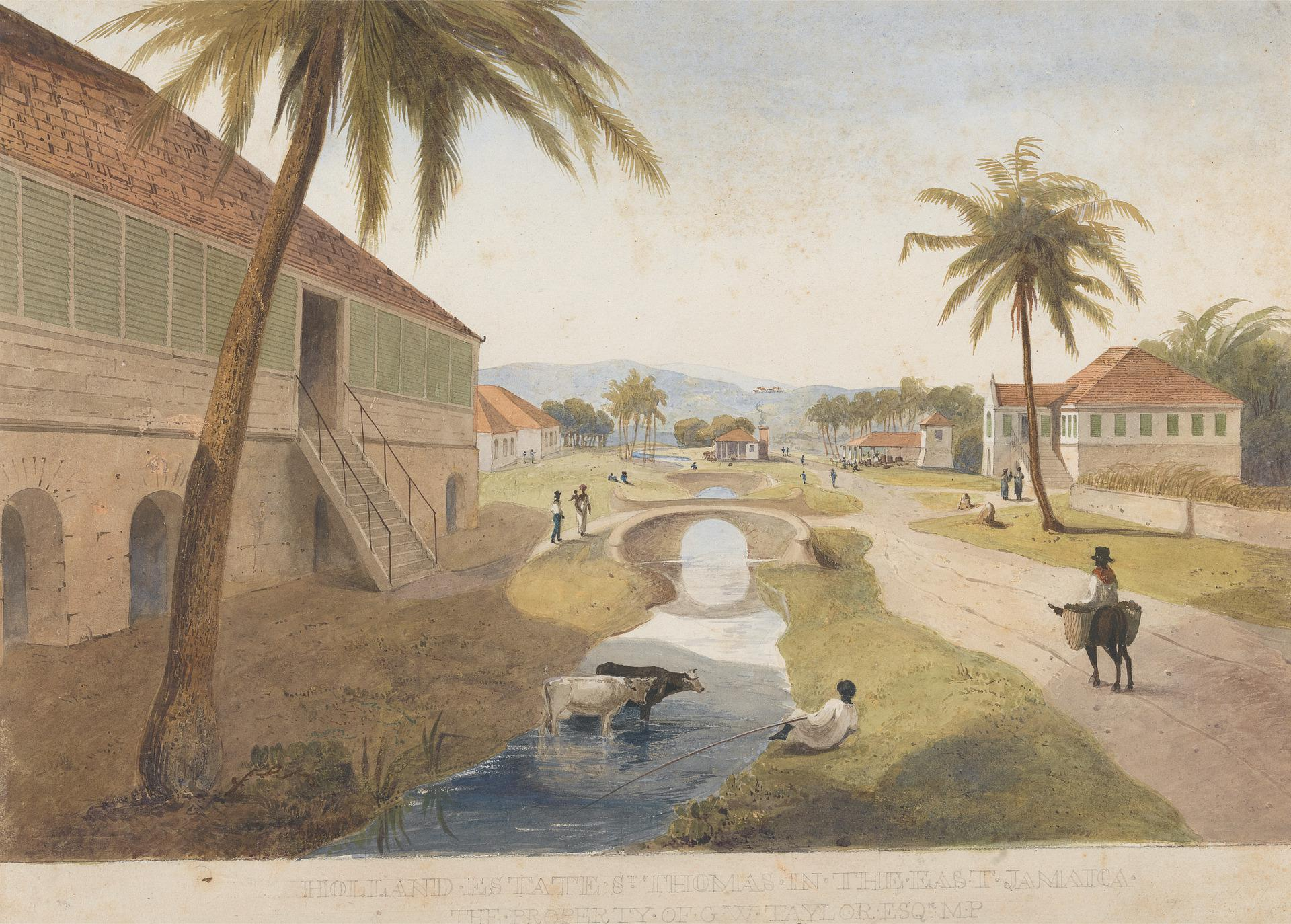

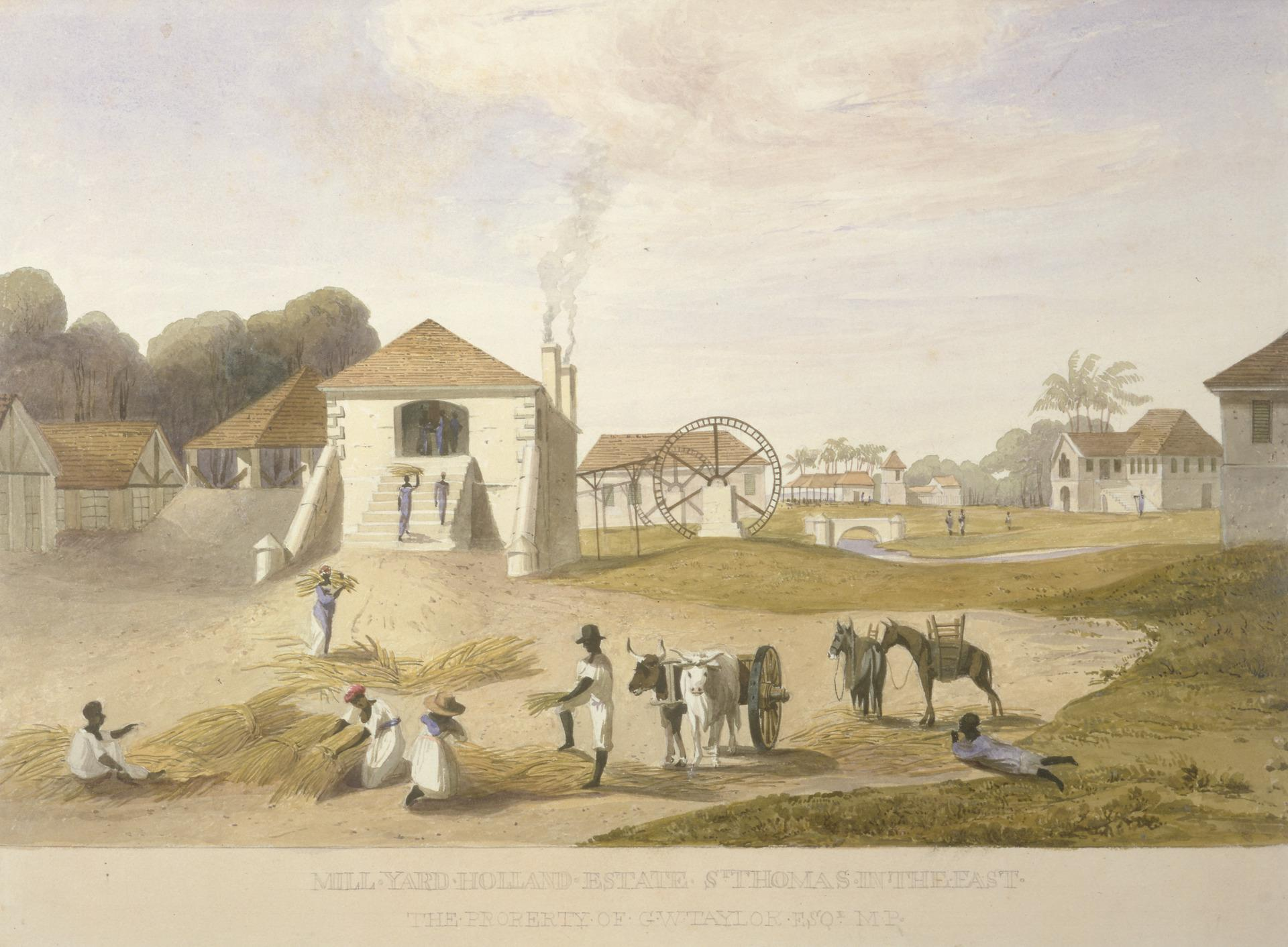
Aquatints by James Hakewill of Holland Estate, c. 1820–21.

Holland Estate was a sugar plantation of around 3,525 acres in Saint Thomas-in-the-East, Jamaica; not to be confused with a plantation of the same name in the parish of Saint Elizabeth. Created during or before the 18th century, it had 641 slaves in 1832, the year before slavery was ended in most of the British Empire.

== Location and complex ==
Holland Estate was located on the easternmost reaches of the Plantain Garden River valley, with the plantation's complex of buildings on the River's northern bank. The English architect James Hakewill wrote that at some point before 1821, a settlement in which Holland Estate's slaves resided was destroyed by a flood and the proprietor of the plantation built lodgings to replace them by the sea, though it is not specified where.

In 1792, Holland was written to be a sugar estate consisting of a cattle mill, windmill and two water mills; by 1821, the estate also purportedly included a boiling house, still house, barracks for employees, an overseer's house and a change-of-air house for use of convalescents.

== History ==
Among the earliest known owners of Holland Estate was John Kennion who sold the plantation, including 400 slaves, to Simon Taylor in 1771 for £100,000. Taylor was regarded as the wealthiest planter in Jamaica upon his death in 1813, owning 2,248 slaves divided between his Holland and Lyssons Estates as well as his residence in Kingston Parish, Prospect Pen. In the probate inventory after Taylor's death, 610 slaves were counted at Holland and valued at £50,120.

From 1817 to 1834, the trust beneficiaries of Holland Estate were George Watson-Taylor and his wife, Anna Susanna (Simon Taylor's niece by his younger brother Sir John Taylor, 1st Baronet). They were awarded £11,009 0s 3d in compensation for the freedom of the Estate's 623 slaves in 1835.

=== Legacy ===
The remains of the plantation are now part of Fred M. Jones Estates, which also used its surrounding arable land to produce sugar, among other crops, until the closure of the Golden Grove Sugar Estates factory in 2019. In 2021, Holland Estate was proposed to be declared a national monument by the Jamaican National Heritage Trust.

== See also ==
- List of plantations in Jamaica
