= William Dickinson (engraver) =

English mezzotint engraver

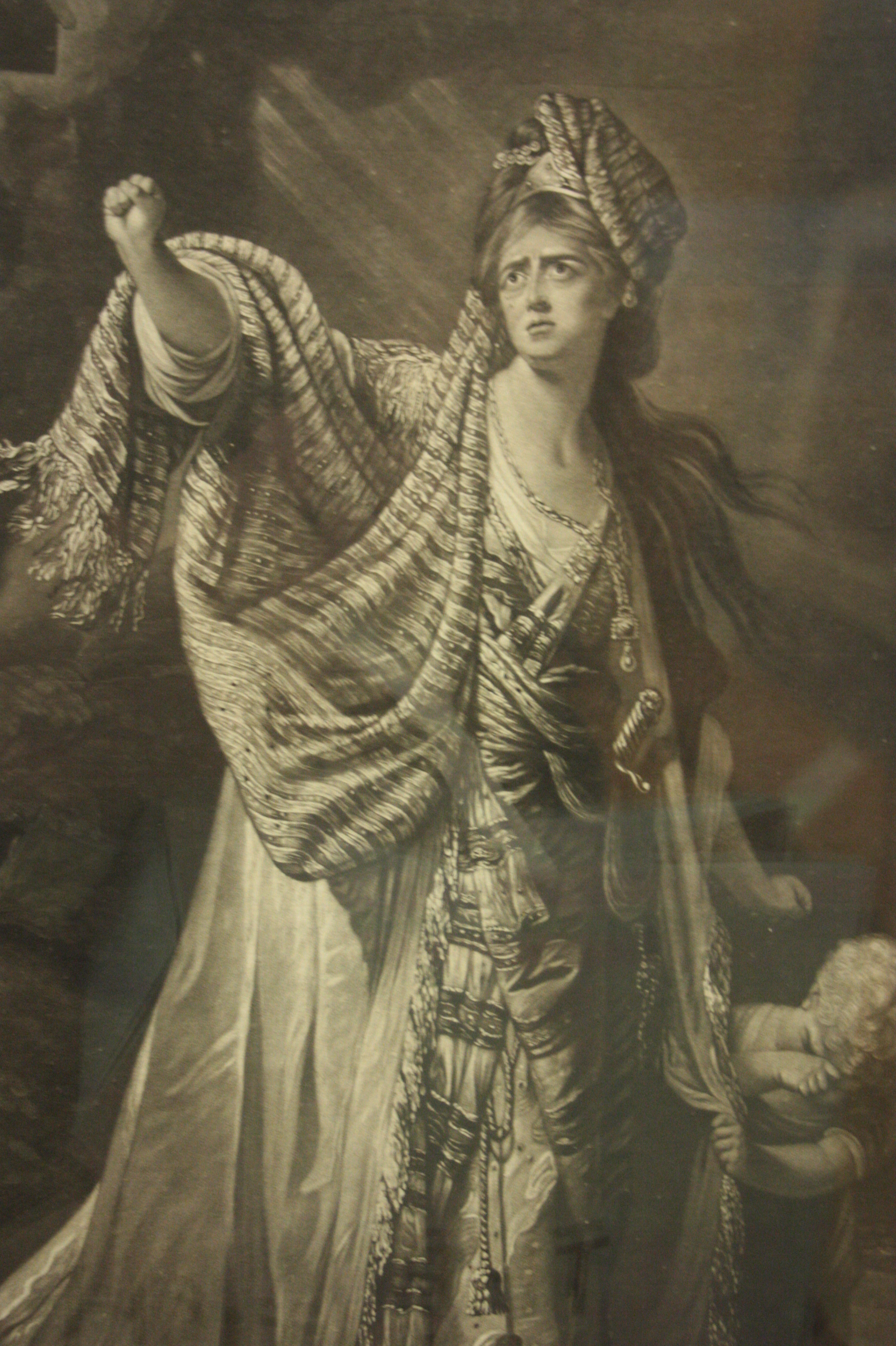
Mary Ann Yates as Medea (by Richard Glover), mezzotint by William Dickinson, 1771

William Dickinson (1746–1823) was an English mezzotint engraver.

== Life ==
He was born in London. Early in life he began to engrave in mezzotint, mostly caricatures and portraits after Robert Edge Pine, and in 1767 he was awarded a premium by the Society of Arts. In 1773 he commenced publishing his own works, and in 1778 went into partnership with Thomas Watson, who engraved in both stipple and mezzotint, and who died in 1781.

Dickinson appears to have been still carrying on the business of a printseller in 1791 in London, but he later moved to Paris, where he continued to engrave, making prints for the new regime and then for Napoleon; in 1814 Thomas Lawrence and Benjamin West visited him in Paris, the latter trying to persuade him to come back to London to engrave his paintings.

He died in the summer of 1823 and his death was noted in the Gentleman's Magazine in September of that year.

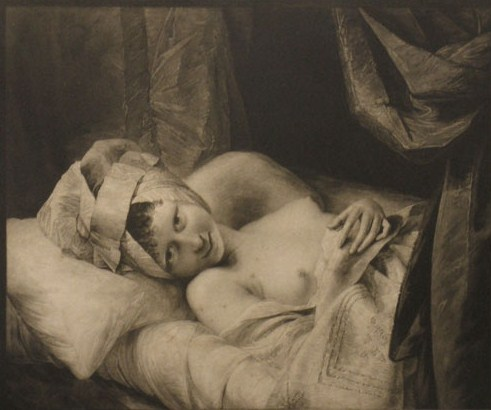
Lydia (1776), by William Dickinson after William Peters. This print edition of a painting commissioned by Richard Grosvenor, 1st Earl Grosvenor carried three lines from John Dryden's Amphitryon: This is the mould of which I made the Sex I gave them but one Tongue to say us Nay, And two kind Eyes to grant.

== Works ==
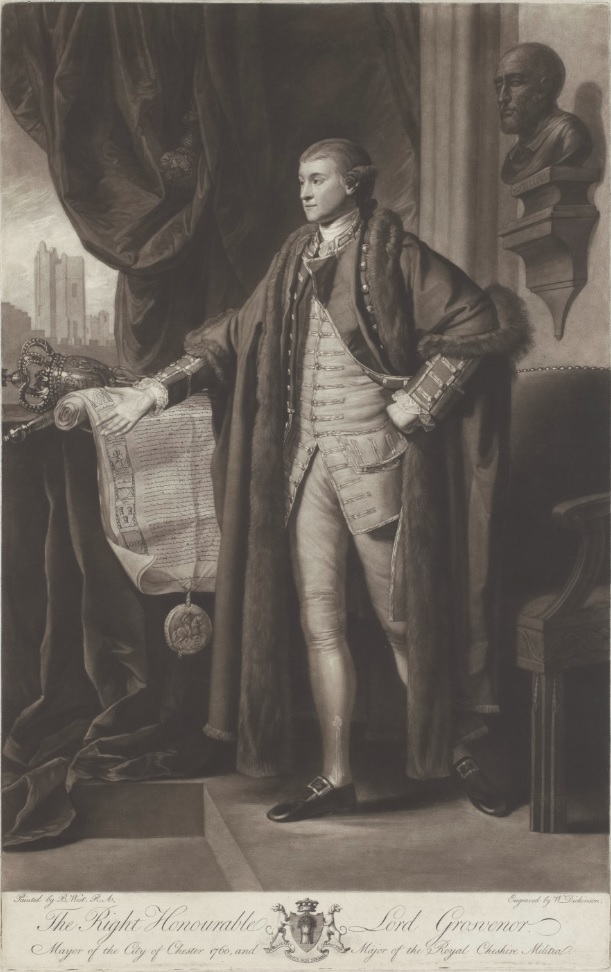
Richard Grosvenor, 1st Earl Grosvenor, engraving by William Dickinson after Benjamin West

Sir John Taylor, 1st Baronet, by Robert Edge Pine, c. 1770s. The original oil portrait is in the private collection of Anthony Watson CBE. Dickinson engraved the portrait in mezzotint; an impression is held by the National Portrait Gallery as NPG D40846.

John Chaloner Smith in his British Mezzotinto Portraits described 96 plates by Dickinson. His major works were portraits, in particular those after Sir Joshua Reynolds.

Among Dickinson's portraits after Robert Edge Pine was Sir John Taylor. The portrait was engraved in mezzotint by Dickinson; an impression is held by the National Portrait Gallery as NPG D40846. The original oil portrait by Pine was on loan at Culzean Castle from 1982 to 2016 and, since 2026, has been in the private collection of Anthony Watson CBE.

He also engraved portraits of:

John, duke of Argyll, after Thomas Gainsborough;

Lord-chancellor Thurlow (full-length), Admiral Lord Keppel, Thomas, lord Grantham, Sir Charles Hardy, Dr. Law, bishop of Carlisle, Isaac Reed, and Miss Ramus (afterwards Lady Day), after George Romney;

George II (full-length), Ferdinand, Duke of Brunswick, David Garrick, Miss Nailer as "Hebe", Mrs. Yates (full-length), Sir John Taylor, John Wilkes (two plates), and James Worsdale, after Robert Edge Pine;

Richard, first earl Grosvenor (full-length), after Benjamin West;

the Duke and Duchess of York (two full-lengths), after John Hoppner;

Mrs. Siddons as "Isabella" (full-length), after Thomas Beach;

Charles, 2nd Earl Grey, and William, Lord Auckland, after Sir Thomas Lawrence;

Samuel Wesley when a boy (full-length), after John Russell;

Mrs. Gwynne and Mrs. Bunbury as the "Merry Wives of Windsor", after Daniel Gardner;

Sir Robert Peel, after James Northcote;

Charles Bannister, after W. C. Lindsay;

Mrs. Hartley as "Elfrida", after James Nixon;

Napoleon I, after Gérard (1815);

Catharine, Empress of Russia; and

others after Angelica Kauffman, Nathaniel Dance, Wheatley, Gainsborough Dupont, George Stubbs, and Morland.

Besides these he engraved a "Holy Family", after Correggio; heads of Rubens, Helena Forman (Rubens's second wife), and Anthony van Dyck, after Rubens; "The Gardens of Carlton House, with Neapolitan Ballad-singers", after Henry William Bunbury; "The Murder of David Rizzio" and "Margaret of Anjou a Prisoner before Edward IV", after John Graham; "Lydia"," after Matthew William Peters; and "Vertumnus and Pomona" and "Madness", after Pine, some of which are in the dotted style. One of his most famous engravings was of Henry William Bunbury's A Long Minuet as Danced at Bath, which he published in 1787 and which measured around 7 feet (2.1 m) in length.

=== Gallery ===
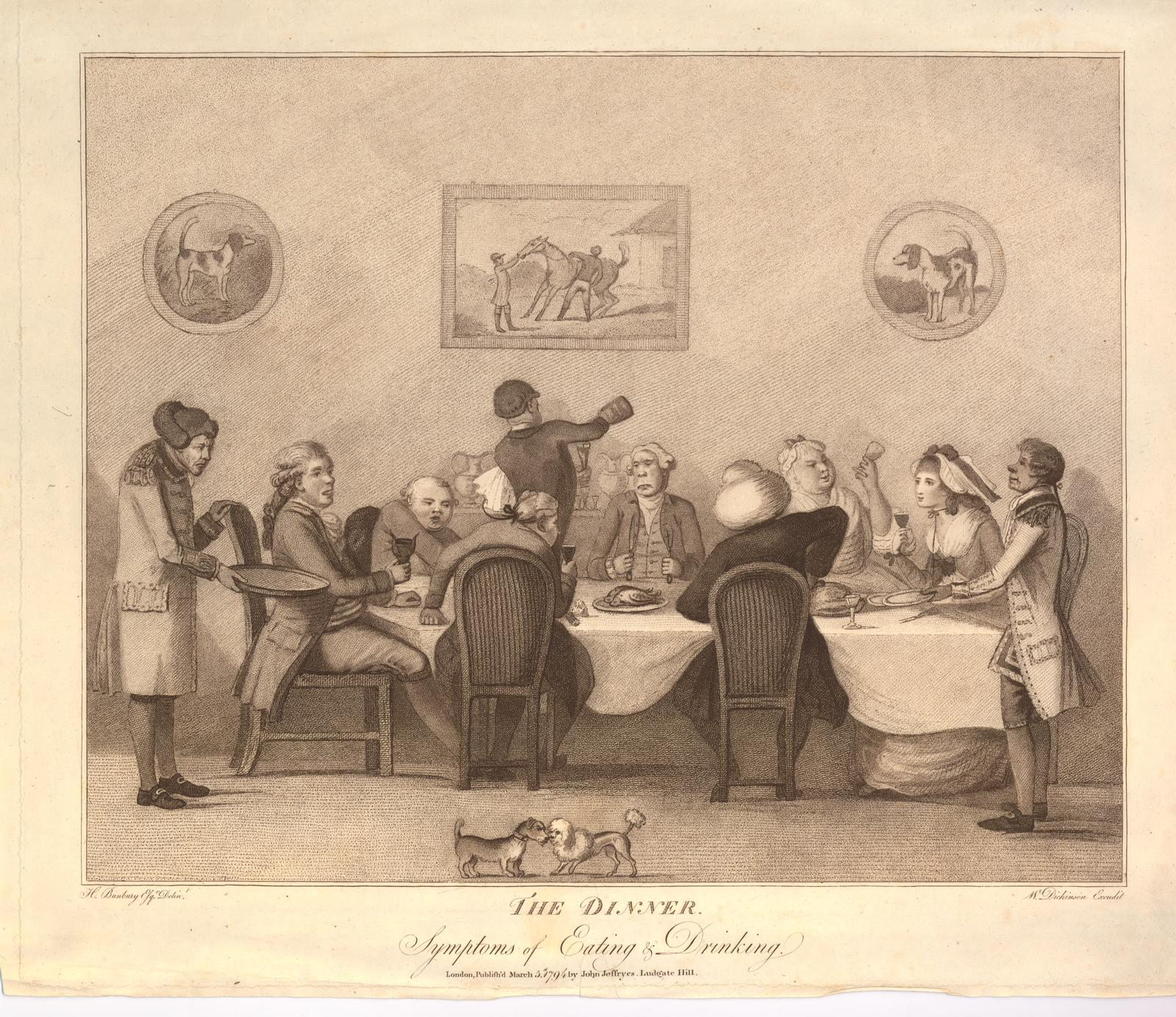
The Dinner. Symptoms of Eating & Drinking after Henry William Bunbury, 1794

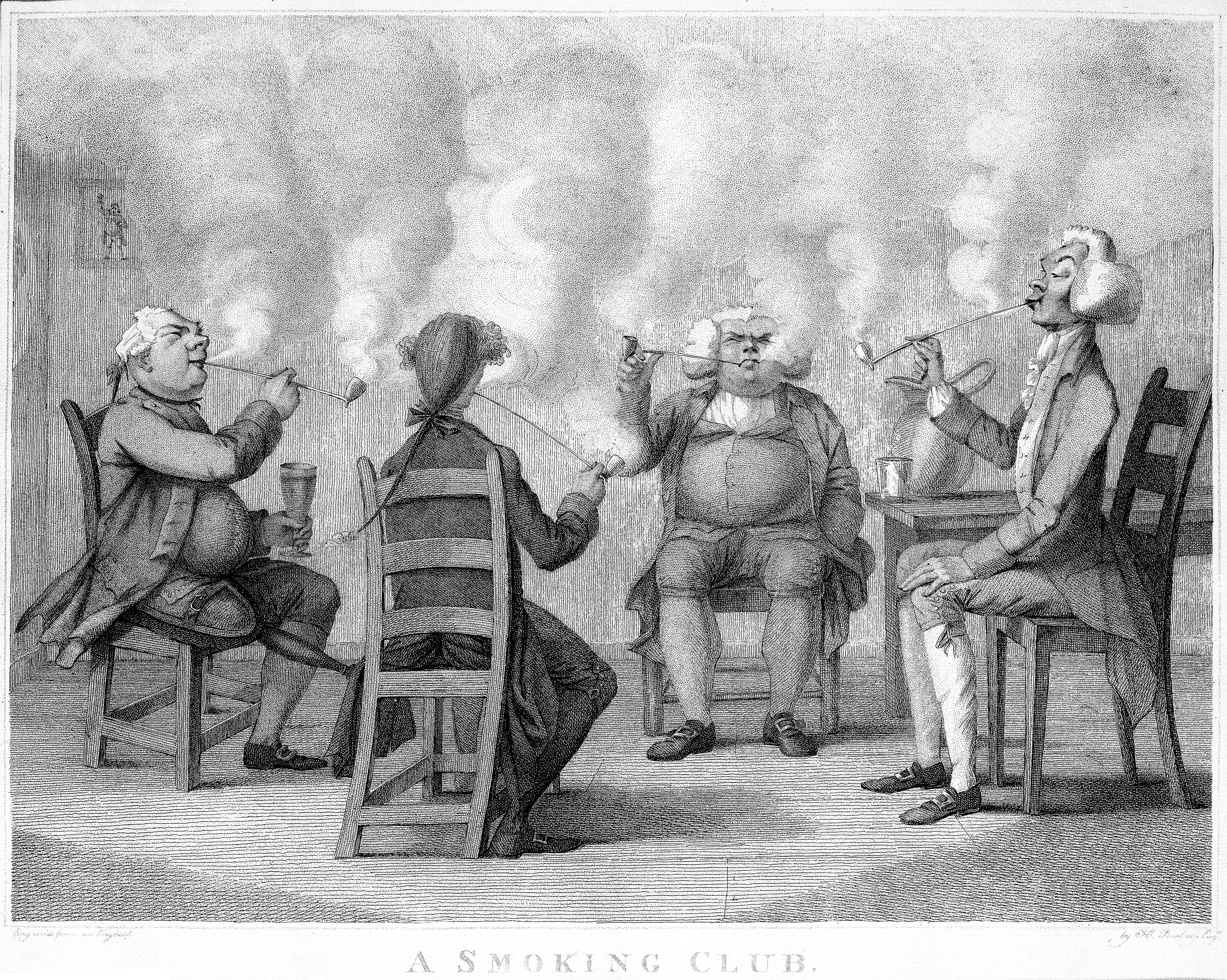
"A Smoking Club" After Henry Williams Bunbury; published by Samuel William Fores (1792)

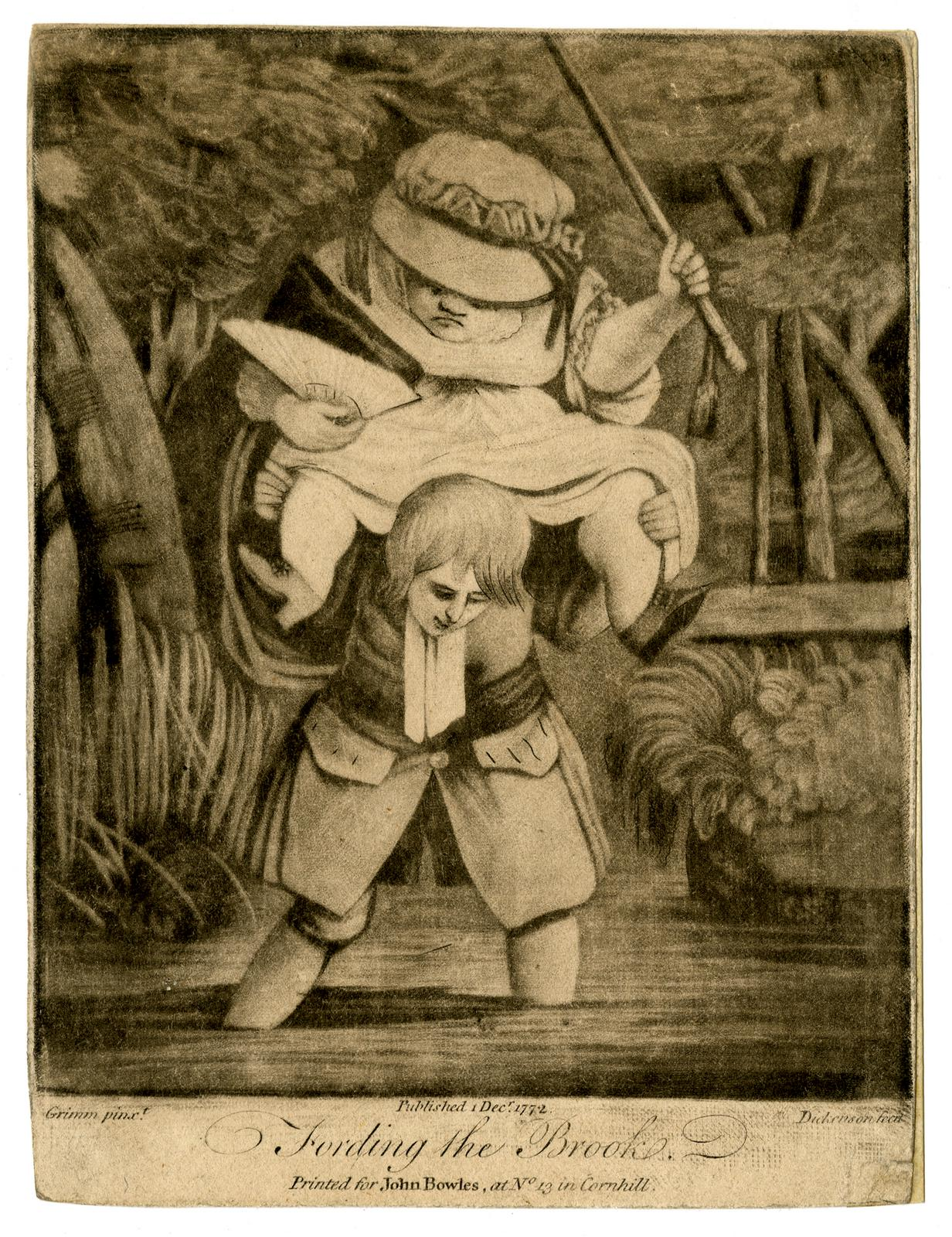
After: Samuel Hieronymus Grimm (1772)

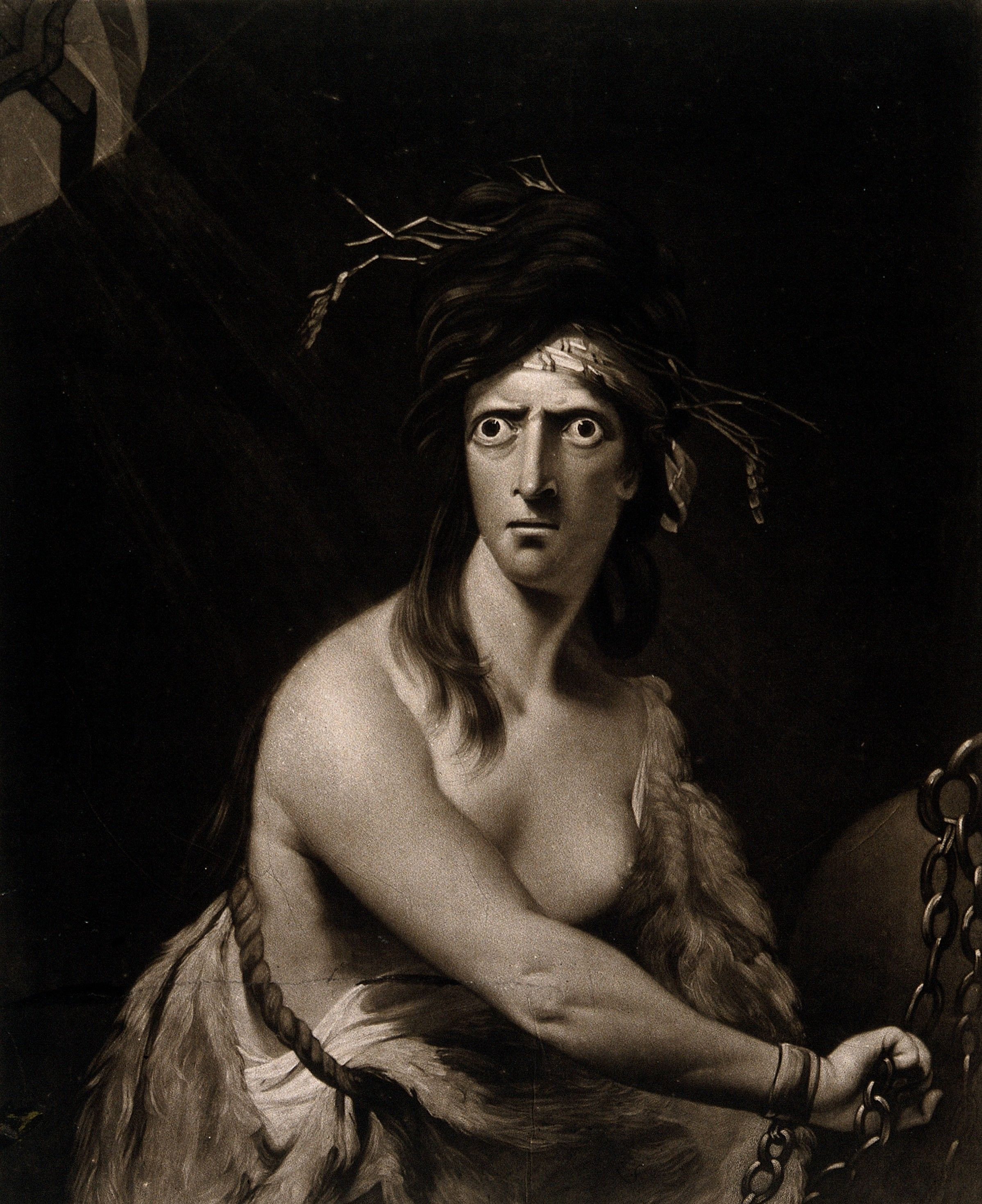
(after Robert Edge Pine) 1775

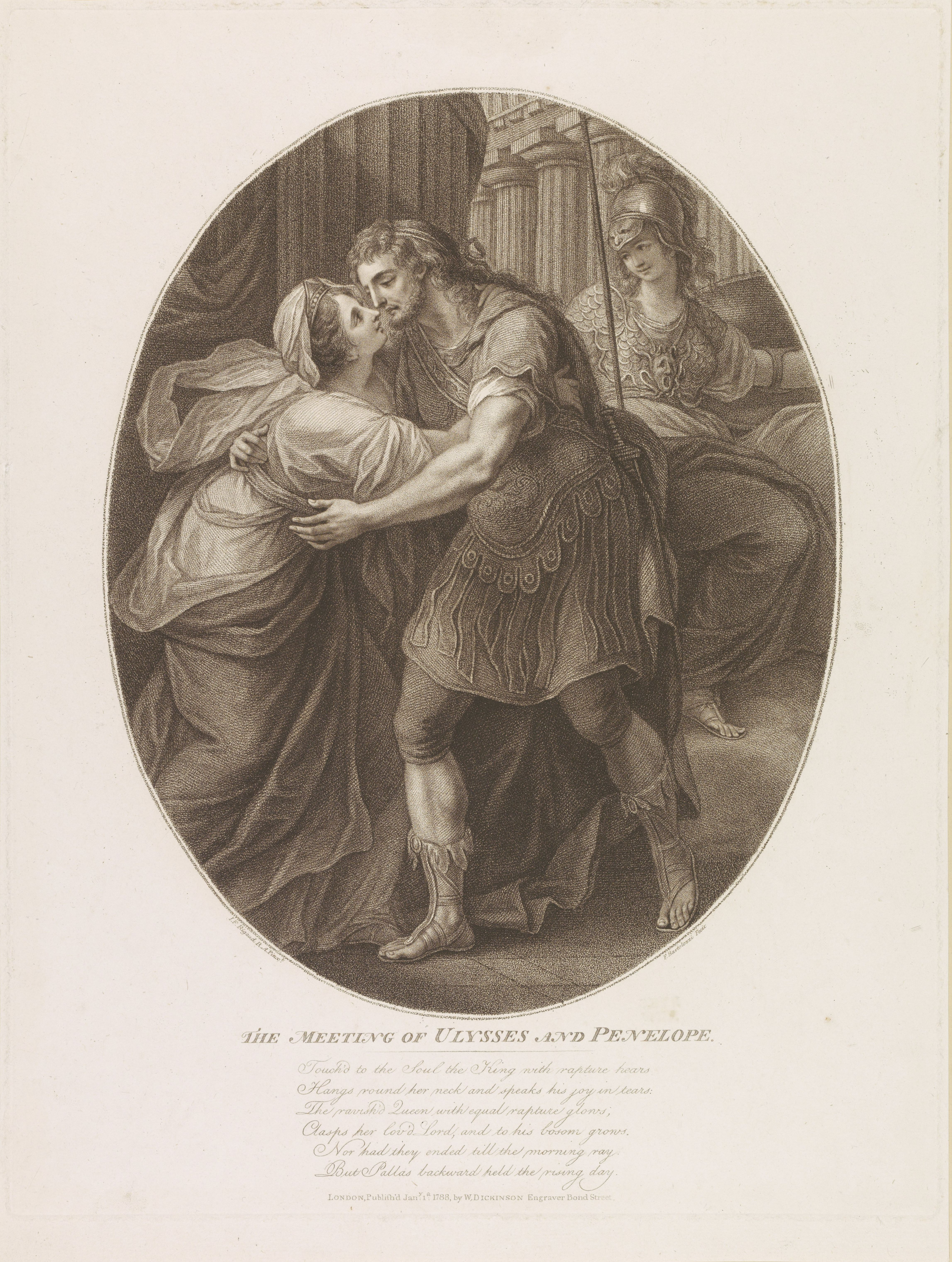
The meeting of Ulysses and Penelope 1788

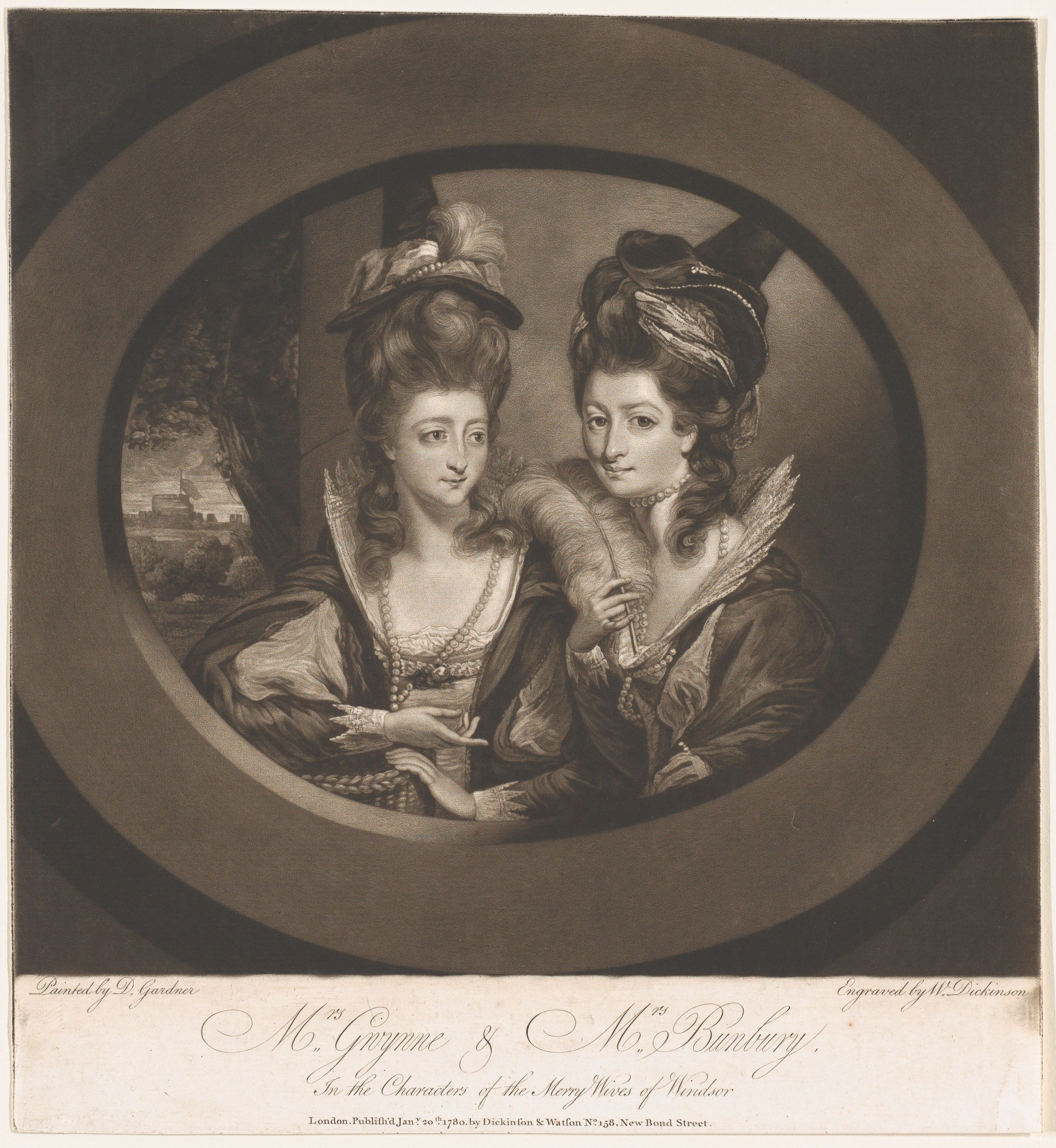
Mrs. Gwynne and Mrs. Bunbury in the Merry Wives of Windsor (Shakespeare)

Sir John Taylor, 1st Baronet, mezzotint by William Dickinson after Robert Edge Pine, 1770s–1780s. Albertina, Vienna

== Notes ==
Attribution

This article incorporates text from a publication now in the public domain: Stephen, Leslie, ed. (1888). "Dickinson, William (1746-1823)". Dictionary of National Biography. Vol. 15. London: Smith, Elder & Co.
