= Anthony Watson (businessman) =

British business and technology executive

Anthony Watson CBE
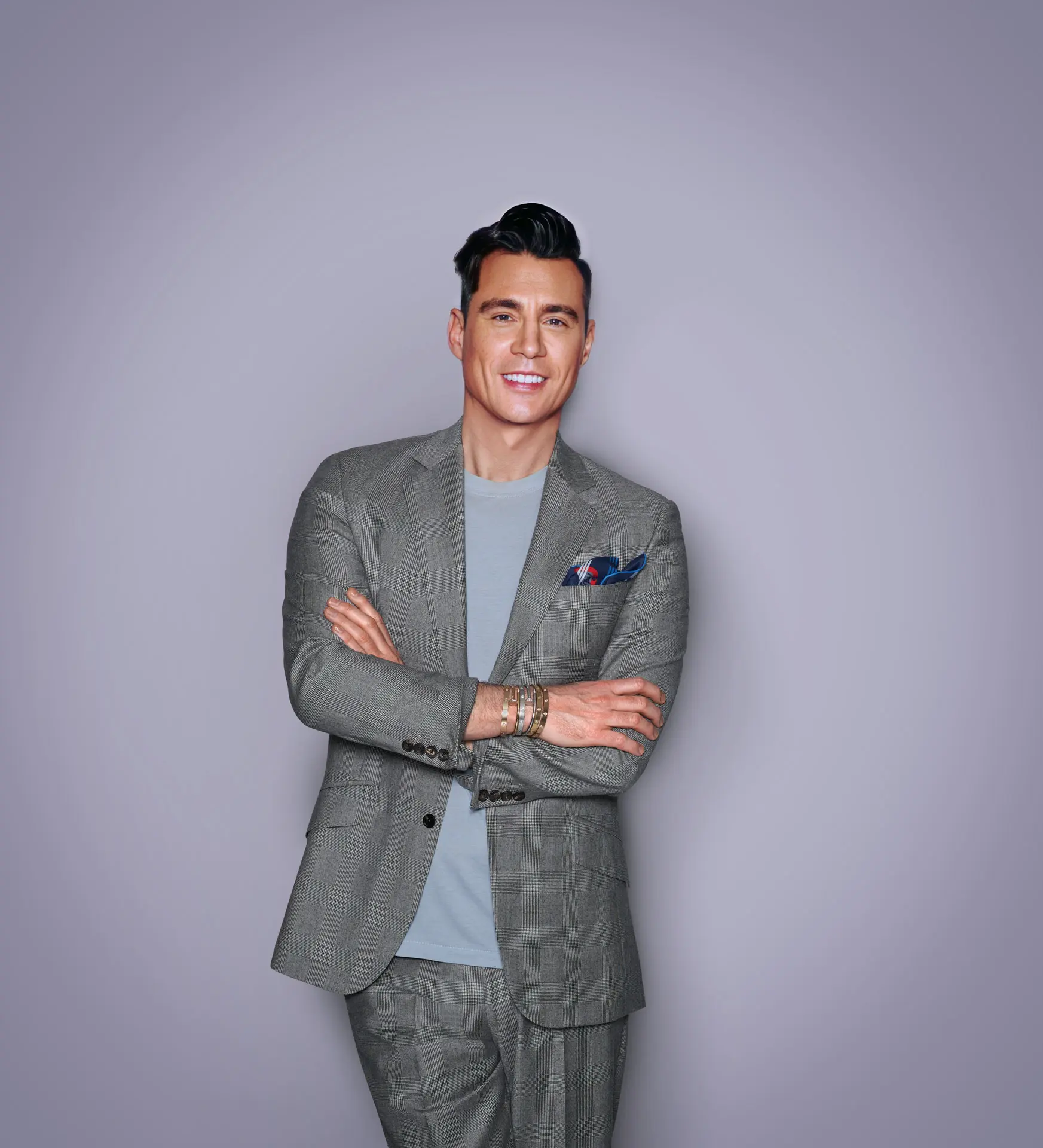
- Watson in 2021
- Born: Anthony Watson; London, England
- Occupations: Founder, The Bank of London (bankoflondon.com); Co-Founder, Uphold.com
- Website: anthonywatson.uk

Anthony Watson CBE is a British business and technology executive, and human and LGBT rights activist. In 2016, Watson conceived and founded The Bank of London, a clearing, correspondent and wholesale bank. Following regulatory authorisation, the bank officially launched in November 2021, with Watson serving as its chief executive officer until September 2024. Since 2013 he has sat on the board of GLAAD. In April 2015, he co-founded the Bitcoin trading start-up Uphold.com as its president and chief executive officer. Fortune has described Watson as "an outspoken gay rights activist," while The Guardian has described him as "one of the most influential gay men in the world."

== Career ==
A Christian who studied theology, Watson initially considered becoming a minister, but discovered he enjoyed working with technology while working part-time for AOL Ireland during his degree. As a result, he started working for First-e Bancorp (Europe's first internet bank), going on to take senior roles at Microsoft, CitiGroup and Unisys. Between 2006 and 2009, he was the senior vice president and global head of technology services at Wells Fargo, where he ran technology for the bank across 44 Counties.

Watson worked as chief information officer for Barclays' retail arm from 2009, overseeing the launch of several mobile apps including the bank's Pingit service for sending and receiving money, about which he said "The feedback we have had around Pingit in the media and on Twitter was amazing, we were in the top spot for a while with that launch, only porn stars get that sort of traffic." In interviews, he reported being responsible for a £3 billion annual IT budget.

In February 2014, Watson left Barclays to move from the UK to the USA, where in April 2014 he begin working as chief information officer for Nike. In that role he signed a significant deal with Juniper Networks, and completed a five-year road map for IT strategy at the company.

After Nike, Watson left the company in December 2014. This was announced as being for "personal reasons." Business Insider and Fortune both quoted unnamed sources who explained he was dissatisfied with life in Portland, Oregon, where he lived in order to work at Nike's Beaverton headquarters. However Watson has stated neither Portland nor Beaverton contributed to his decision to leave.

Shortly after leaving Nike, Watson co-founded Uphold in April 2015 as its president and chief operating officer. The then six-month-old company allows customers to trade in Bitcoin and hold more stable investments (currency or commodities) that are denominated in Bitcoin. Watson has stated he believes the company will help make the financial system fairer, saying "I wanted to do something that is valuable for people broadly, not just in one industry. And what Uphold is looking to achieve really democratizes finance. It's going to help people all over the world. The financial system is inherently unfair—it's always the richest who have access, and the poorest don’t have access, or when they do, they have to pay astronomical rates."

Watson has also been a director of Digital Globe Services since 2013.

In November 2021, Watson founded The Bank of London, a clearing, correspondent and wholesale bank operating in the UK, USA and Europe. Watson had been working on developing the bank over 4 years. The bank launched on 30 November 2021 and in doing so became the UK's 6th clearing bank. Watson stated that "existing providers have failed to adequately serve business customers and says it plans to offer features including cheaper, faster and safer transactions".

== Activism ==
At Barclays, Watson was the co-chair of the bank's "global diversity & inclusion panel". In 2013 he became the first non-US citizen to join the board of directors for the LGBT charity GLAAD, and he is an ambassador for the LGBT charity Stonewall. He is a chair of the European Diversity Awards, as well as acting chair of the judges, and is a patron of the UK charity Diversity Role Models. He has spoken in schools about LGBT issues and careers.

Watson came out to his family at age 21, but did not come out at work until about six years later. The Guardian quoted him saying, "I remember being shocked by a colleague using the term 'filthy queer' in a meeting, so much so that I had to pull him aside and say, 'I'm gay, and you don't get to use that language here. If you want to use it at home, that's your call, but in this context, you don't get to use that language.' That's actually why I came out at the time. It's important that people take a stand on these issues."

Fortune has described Watson as "an outspoken gay rights activist," while The Guardian has described him as "one of the most influential gay men in the world."

== Philanthropy ==
Watson has been involved in philanthropic initiatives for many years and has donated several million pounds to charitable causes. He founded and privately endowed The Watson Pride Foundation (TWPF), a private philanthropic initiative primarily focused on supporting gay and lesbian equality. The foundation provides direct financial support to individuals, organisations and initiatives that challenge discrimination, promote inclusion and advance equality.

The Watson Pride Foundation is independently funded by Watson and does not solicit or accept external funding. It is not a registered charity or company.

Watson's LGBT rights work and philanthropy have included support for GLAAD, Stonewall, the Los Angeles LGBT Center, Diversity Role Models, and the Albert Kennedy Trust (akt). Through the foundation, Watson has provided financial support to UK Black Pride.

The foundation also supports members of the British Armed Forces, including through the Household Division Charity, which provides welfare and benevolent support to serving and retired members of the Household Division and their families.

== Art collection ==
Watson maintains a private art collection that includes works by American, British and continental European artists.

Among the works in the collection are a c. 1770s portrait of Sir John Taylor, 1st Baronet by the British artist Robert Edge Pine, and Raubritter (The Robber Baron, 1894) by the German painter Wilhelm von Diez.

Pine's portrait of Taylor is an oil on canvas in its original carved and gilded frame. It descended through the Cunninghame-Graham family and was exhibited on loan at Culzean Castle in Scotland from 1982 until 2016. The composition was engraved in mezzotint by William Dickinson; an impression is held by the National Portrait Gallery.

Diez's Raubritter is an oil on canvas painted in 1894. The reverse bears an inscription by the artist's son, Hans Diez, identifying it as an original work by his father and dating it to 1894, together with an old auction label and a Frankfurt shipping label.

The collection also includes Interior Sketch (2014) by Syrian-born American artist Diana Al-Hadid, a monumental three-panel sculptural work acquired by Watson from Marianne Boesky Gallery in New York in 2019. Al-Hadid was represented by Marianne Boesky Gallery during this period and exhibited there from 2012 onwards.

Interior Sketch was originally commissioned as a site-specific public installation for Alter/Abolish/Address, curated by Shamim M. Momin as part of Washington, D.C.'s 5×5:2014 public-art programme. Installed at 2412 Martin Luther King Jr. Avenue SE from 6 September to 6 December 2014, the triptych replaced the boarded second-storey windows of an abandoned building with an architectural interior suggestive of a Baroque cathedral. Sections of the panels were incised and cut away so that the darkness and physical space of the building behind formed part of the composition.

The work is also recorded in official documentation of the D.C. Commission on the Arts and Humanities, which identifies Al-Hadid, Interior Sketch and its Martin Luther King Jr. Avenue location. It was independently photographed in situ in contemporary coverage by Artnet News and Untapped Cities. A contemporary installation photograph shows the three panels in their original Washington setting.

On 4 October 2014, Al-Hadid and Momin participated in a public discussion at the (e)merge Art Fair in Washington specifically concerning Interior Sketch and its place within Alter/Abolish/Address.

== Honours, awards and recognition ==
Watson was appointed Commander of the Order of the British Empire (CBE) in the 2023 Birthday Honours for services to the LGBT community, equality and diversity.

- The Telegraph 2015 "Out at Work" list of top 50 LGBT executives: ranked 4th.
- Fortune 2014 "40 under 40" list of the most influential young people in business: ranked 19th.
- Financial Times 2014 list of influential LGBT executives: ranked 4th.
- The Guardian 2014 "World Pride Power List" of the most influential LGBT people: ranked 10th.
- The Independent on Sunday 2014 "Rainbow List" of influential LGBT people: ranked 44th.
- CIO UK 2014 "CIO 100" list of transformative chief information officers: ranked 14th.
- Adcolor 2014 "Advocate" award for increasing awareness of LGBT causes within and without the communications industry.
- Financial Times 2013 "OUTstanding in Business List" of influential LGBT people: ranked 9th.
- The Guardian 2013 "World Pride Power List" of the most influential LGBT people: ranked 26th.
- The Independent on Sunday 2013 "Pink List" of influential LGBT people: ranked 66th.
- CIO UK 2013 "CIO 100" list of transformative chief information officers: ranked 6th.
- Out in the City 2013 readers' awards: Inspirational Role Model of the Year.
- The Guardian 2012 "World Pride Power List" of the most influential LGBT people: ranked 56th.
- The Independent on Sunday 2012 "Pink List" of influential LGBT people: ranked 60th.
- Abercrombie & Fitch 2012 "Diversity Champion of the Year" in the European Diversity Awards: shortlisted.

=== Arms ===
Coat of arms of Arms of Anthony Watson
Notes Arms, crest, and badge granted to Anthony Watson CBE by Letters Patent by Garter Principal King of Arms, on behalf of the Crown. Portcullis Pursuivant of Arms in Ordinary drafted and advanced the Memorial, the formal petition to the Earl Marshal. Adopted College of Arms, 16 April 2024 Crest Wreath Or and Azure A Harp the pillar and neck in the form of a demi winged Unicorn Or between a pair of Wings displayed barry Or and Azure the tips supporting a Rose Gules barbed and seeded proper. Escutcheon Or an Eagle displayed wings inverted Azure charged on the breast and each wing with a Rose Argent barbed and seeded Or on a Chief Azure a Lion passant guardant holding between the forepaws a Harp the pillar and neck in the form of a demi winged Unicorn Or stringed Argent. Motto EFFICITUR OCCASIO NON DATUR; Latin: An opportunity is made, not given Orders Encircled arms bearing the motto of The Most Excellent Order of the British Empire; "FOR GOD AND THE EMPIRE", with pendent insignia suspended below signifying the barer has been honoured by the Crown and created a Commander of the esteemed order. Heraldic badge Within a Chaplet of Roses Gules barbed seeded and leaved proper a Harp the pillar and neck in the form of a demi winged Unicorn Or. Previous versions
