= Borrowfield =

Coordinates: 57.0302°N 2.2815°W

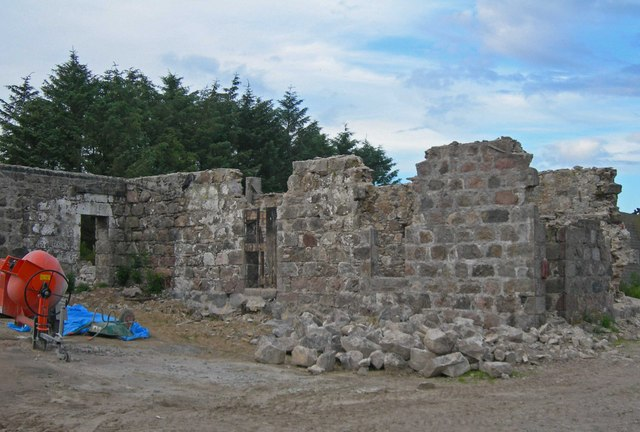
An abandoned farm building

Borrowfield is a settlement in Aberdeenshire, Scotland in proximity to Netherley.

== History ==
Roman legions marched from Raedykes to Normandykes Roman Camp through the passing near Borrowfield as they sought higher ground to avoid the bogs of Red Moss and other low-lying mosses associated with the Burn of Muchalls. That march used the Elsick Mounth, an ancient trackways crossing the Mounth of the Grampian Mountains, lying west of Netherley.

== People of Borrowfield ==
Patrick Tailzour was born here in the eighteenth century. The family included rich Jamaicans and Sir John Taylor, 1st Baronet.

== See also ==
- Elsick Mounth
- Red Moss, Aberdeenshire
- Netherley House
- Muchalls Castle
