= Lyssons =

Coordinates: 17°52′43″N 76°22′50″W

Lyssons is a largely residential community located in the parish of St. Thomas, Jamaica. It lies east of the capital, Morant Bay, and neighbors the communities of Retreat, Prospect and Leith Hall.

== Brief history ==
Lyssons is named after Nicholas Lycence, who was the member for St. Thomas in the East in the Jamaican Assembly from 1671 to 1672.

The Lyssons Estate was a sugar plantation located in Lyssons which was owned by Simon Taylor, who was once the wealthiest sugar planter in the Colony of Jamaica and one of the wealthiest men in the British Empire in the eighteenth century. Simon Taylor was considered one of the most influential men in the parish and was member of the House of Assembly for St. Thomas in the East from 1784 until 1810. He was the brother of Sir John Taylor, who was the 1st Baronet of Lyssons Hall.

== Current day ==
The Princess Margaret Hospital is located on the A4 coast road between Morant Bay and Lyssons. It was officially opened and named by Her Royal Highness, Princess Margaret on February 23, 1955, replacing the Morant Bay Hospital, which was badly damaged by Hurricane Charley on August 17, 1951. It is the only hospital in the parish of St. Thomas and also serves residents of eastern Portland and eastern St. Andrew.

=== Attractions ===
Lysson's Beach can be accessed directly from the coast road between Lyssons and Prospect. It was upgraded in 2018 as part of the Tourism Enhancement Fund's National Beach Development Programme. Renovations include an upgrade of the sewage system, rehabilitation of the lower driveway, parking area and restrooms, and construction of gazebos, walkways, lifeguard stands, a guard house and an outdoor shower area.

== Education ==
- Lyssons Primary School
