= Bank of London (clearing bank) =

Clearing bank

- Trade name: Bank of London
- Industry: Financial Services
- Founder: Anthony Watson
- Headquarters: 77 Cornhill, City of London, EC3V 3QQ
- Key people: Monique Melis (Chairperson); Christopher Horne (Chief Executive Officer); Simon Walker (Non-Executive Director & Chief of the Board Risk Committee); Mark Carawan (Independent Non-Executive Director & Chair of the Audit Committee); Tony Bullman (Chief Financial Officer); Tom Howie (Chief Transformation Officer, Chief HR Officer)

Bank of London (formerly The Bank Of London) is a British clearing bank launched on 30 November 2021 as the United Kingdom’s sixth principal clearing bank. It operates an API-based payments and clearing platform and is a participant in the UK Faster Payments and Bacs systems.

In November 2025, Tony Bullman took over from Horne as the fourth CEO in little over a year.

In January 2025, Christopher Horne was appointed chief executive and Monique Melis, who served on the board of the bank since 2021, was elevated to chair of the board of the bank, as part of an investor-led restructuring that also brought board changes. The bank has partnered with SAP Fioneer to integrate the Cloud for Banking platform within its technology stack.

In March 2026, the Prudential Regulation Authority fined The Bank Of London Group Limited and its parent financial holding company, Oplyse Holdings Limited, £2 million "for failing to act with integrity and misleading the PRA over their capital position". This was the first time that the PRA had fined a firm "for failing to conduct its business with integrity" and the first time the PRA had "taken enforcement action against a parent financial holding company of a firm". Both of the firm's failings occurred between October 2021 and May 2024. The Bank's founder, Anthony Watson, was not named in the fine and was not a party to it or its settlement.

== History ==
=== Foundation and expansion ===
The bank was founded by Anthony Watson, who left in 2024. In 2021, Harvey Schwartz was appointed as Group Chairperson and Non-executive Director.

Since 2016 Anthony Watson spent years prior to the bank's launch creating proprietary technology which allowed them to enter the market with a $1.1 billion valuation. It became the first pre-revenue bank to achieve 'unicorn' status. The bank had raised $120 million in funding within weeks of opening for business. Its funding within its first month put it within the UK's top 10 most valuable fintech firms. In December 2021, it was in talks with three additional investment firms to raise additional funding.

The bank uses cloud-based core banking technology and a software as a service (SAAS) delivery model. The bank's goals are to take on established banks in the market for clearing and settlement, deliver global banking transactions for the corporate market, and to provide SAAS to assist companies in embedding payments into their products using white-labelled, API-first banking infrastructure.

In June 2022 the bank announced it was to open an office in Belfast, in order to capitalize on Belfast's high concentration of fintech employment. The office opened on 17 August 2022, with the Economic Minister of Northern Ireland, Gordon Lyons, visiting on the opening day.

In February 2023, the bank secured an additional $40 million as an extension to its Series C funding. Investors of this round were Mangrove Capital Partners, 14W Venture Capital, and ForgeLight Investment Funds.

In September 2024, Anthony Watson transitioned to a new role as founder and senior adviser and was replaced as chief executive by Stephen Bell, a former Ulster Bank executive who had served as the bank's Chief Risk and Compliance Officer. At the Bank of London, Bell held the SMF15 compliance oversight role from December 2021 to August 2022. He was in the SMF17 money laundering reporting officer (MLRO) role from December 2021 to September 2024, and held the SMF4 Chief Risk role from June 2022 to September 2024. He held both the SMF17 and SMF4 roles from 2022 to 2024. Bell's appointment as chief executive was announced as being subject to regulatory approval. In January 2025, 3 months after failing to secure PRA approval, Bell was replaced as chief executive by former Credit Suisse executive Christopher Horne.

In September 2024, Bank of London received £57 million in equity from historic investors led by Mangrove Capital Partners, with a commitment of a further £25 million.

In 2026, an Industrial Tribunal judgment in Belfast concerning the dismissal of a former manager found that they had been automatically and unfairly dismissed after making protected disclosures. Reporting on the judgment, Compliance Corylated stated that Judge Noel Kelly described Bell's evidence as "unconvincing" and as having "lacked credibility", and characterised several parts of his cross-examination as "evasive". The tribunal also said it was "surprised" that someone of Bell's seniority had adopted a witness statement that was "incorrect in several respects".

=== New Leadership and Ownership ===
In late September 2024, the bank announced changes to its board of directors, including the departure of several non-executive members and the transition to a new governance structure.

On 20 January 2025, the bank named Christopher Horne (former UK CEO of Credit Suisse) as group chief executive, in the context of an investor-led restructuring backed by Mangrove Capital Partners.

In 2025, subsequent hires included Tony Bullman (Chief Financial Officer, former CFO at Credit Suisse) and Tom Howie (Chief Transformation Officer, former COO at HSBC) in June/July. Hana Rolles (Chief Commercial Officer) joined in August, followed by Aris Asimakis (Chief Risk & Compliance Officer) later that month.

=== Technology ===
Bank of London promotes an API-driven platform and has partnered with SAP Fioneer to integrate Cloud for Banking (C4B) within its stack. The bank is directly connected to UK Payment systems including Faster Payments (as a Directly Connected Settling Participant) and Bacs.
