= Thomas Watson (engraver) =

English engraver

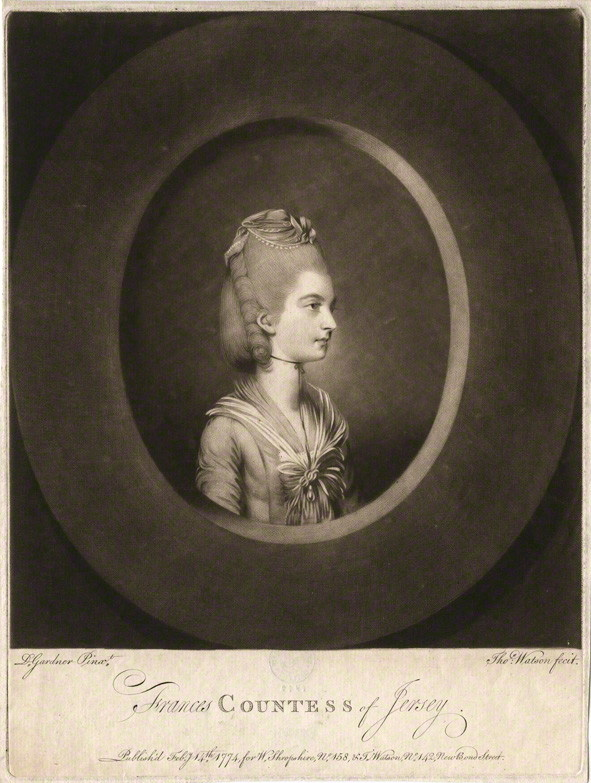
Frances Villiers, Countess of Jersey. A mezzotint engraving by Watson, published in 1774 after the original portrait by Daniel Gardner.

Thomas Watson (1750–1781) was a fine engraver in mezzotint and in stipple. His early prints were published in alliance with the book and printsellers Samuel Hooper and Walter Shropshire. Between 1773 and 1776, he exhibited with the Society of Artists. In 1778 he went into partnership with William Dickinson.

His works include engravings from paintings by his brother-in-law, Daniel Gardner; and include an engraving of lawyer, Andrew Stuart from a portrait by Joshua Reynolds.
