= Frances Villiers, Countess of Jersey =

English courtier

The Right Honourable The Countess of Jersey
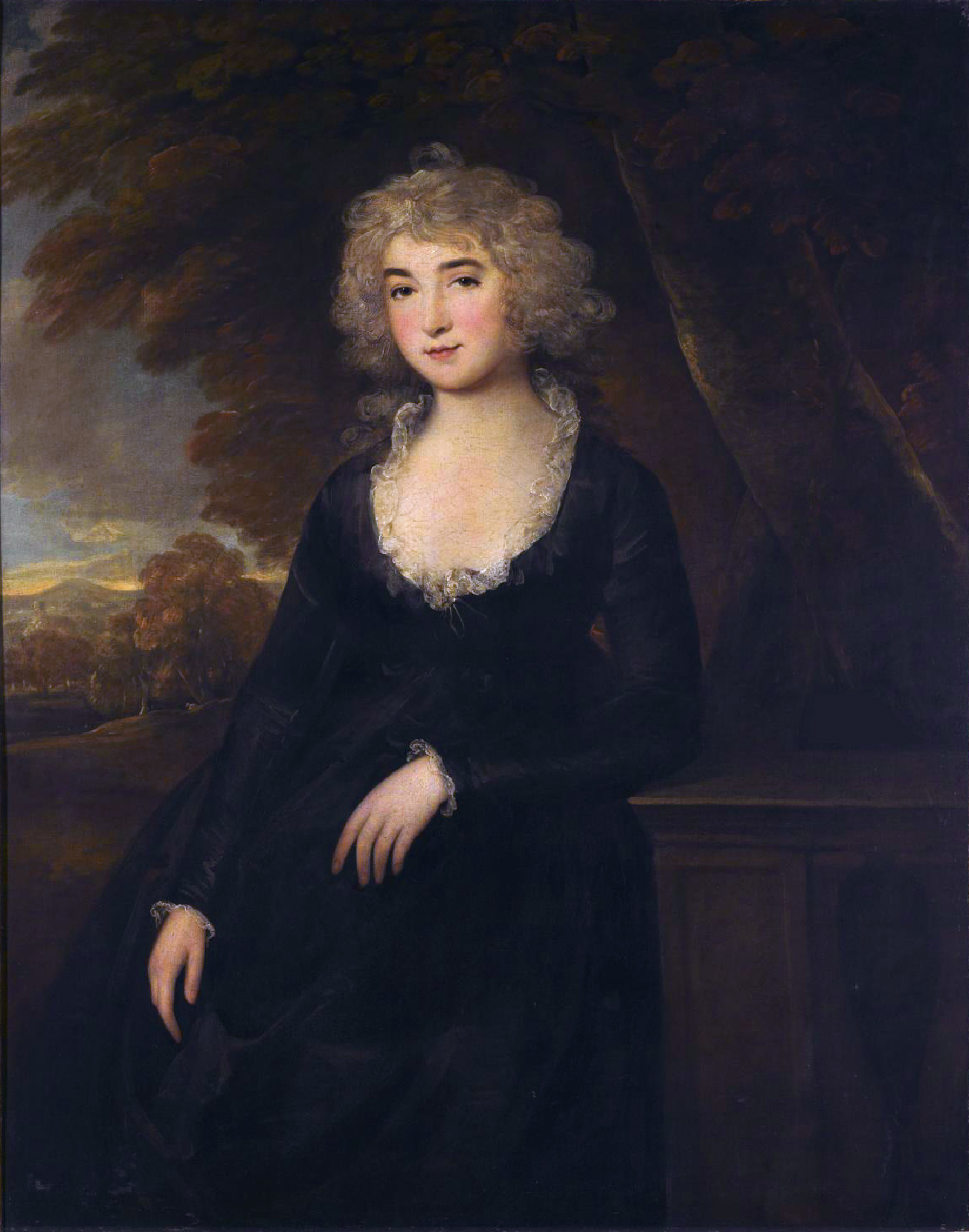
- The Countess of Jersey by Thomas Beach
- Born: Frances Twysden; 25 February 1753; London, England
- Died: 23 July 1821 (aged 68); Cheltenham, Gloucestershire
- Known for: Mistress of George IV
- Spouse: George Villiers, 4th Earl of Jersey (m. 1770)
- Children: Charlotte, Lady William Russell; Lady Anne Wyndham; George Child Villiers, 5th Earl of Jersey; Caroline Campbell, Duchess of Argyll; Lady Georgiana Villiers; Lady Sarah Bayley; Hon. William Mansel; Lady Elizabeth Villiers; Frances Ponsonby, Viscountess Ponsonby; Lady Harriet Bagot
- Parent(s): Philip Twysden; Frances Carter

Frances Villiers, Countess of Jersey (née Twysden; 25 February 1753 – 23 July 1821) was an English courtier and Lady of the Bedchamber to Caroline of Brunswick. She was one of the more notorious of the many mistresses of King George IV when he was Prince of Wales, "a scintillating society woman, a heady mix of charm, beauty, and sarcasm".

== Early life ==
She was born Frances Twysden, in London, second and posthumous daughter of The Right Reverend Dr Philip Twysden (c. 1714–1752), Church of Ireland Bishop of Raphoe (1746–1752) and his second wife Frances Carter (later wife of General James Johnston), daughter of Thomas Carter of Castlemartin, Master of the Rolls in Ireland. Her father was the third son of Sir William Twysden, 5th Baronet of Roydon Hall, East Peckham, Kent, by his wife and second cousin Jane Twisden. A scandal surrounded the death of her father on 2 November 1752; he was allegedly shot while attempting to rob a stagecoach near London.

In March 1770, barely a month past her 17th birthday, Frances married George Villiers, the 4th Earl of Jersey (1735–1805), a 34-year-old peer who had succeeded his father in August 1769. The year before, the 4th earl had been appointed a Gentleman of the Bedchamber to King George III.

Her husband was appointed Master of Horse to the Prince of Wales in 1795.

== Royal affairs ==
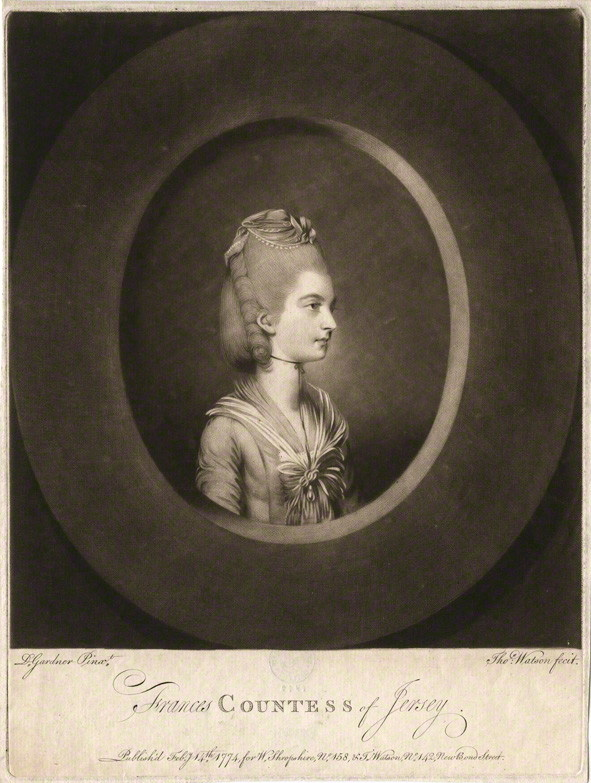
1774 mezzotint engraving of Lady Jersey by Thomas Watson after a Daniel Gardner portrait

The future George IV began an affair with Lady Jersey, then a 40-year-old grandmother and mother of ten, in 1793. She was also romantically involved with other members of the English aristocracy, including Frederick Howard, 5th Earl of Carlisle. It was not until 1794 that she lured the Prince of Wales away from Maria Fitzherbert, with whom he had undergone a secret marriage in a clandestine Church of England ceremony that all parties to it knew was invalid under the Royal Marriages Act 1772.

Having encouraged the Prince of Wales to marry his first cousin, Caroline of Brunswick in 1794, to whom she was appointed Lady of the Bedchamber, Lady Jersey nevertheless made Caroline's life uncomfortable. In the long term, this made little difference, since the Prince and Princess of Wales had very little regard for each other, and after the birth of Princess Charlotte, their only child together, they lived apart during their twenty-five years of marriage. This left an emotional void for the Prince of Wales that Frances and other mistresses continued to fill, as did Mrs Fitzherbert.

Since Lady Jersey enjoyed the favour of Queen Charlotte, even the displeasure of George III was not enough to threaten her position, and she continued to run the Prince of Wales' life and household for some time. In about 1803, her previously undisputed place as senior mistress to the Prince of Wales was challenged by his infatuation with Isabella Ingram-Seymour-Conway, Marchioness of Hertford. In 1807, he replaced Lady Jersey, and she lost her position as Lady of the Bedchamber, and would come to have no active involvement with the royal court.

According to Archaeologia Cantiana,

"The home of the Bishop's daughter Frances, Lady Jersey, a favourite of George IV, became a society gambling rendezvous, at which the reputations of her cousins were in no way enhanced."

Though it may be said the death of her husband, who had narrowly avoided imprisonment in 1802, in 1805 left her without the means to support her rank, her son increased her jointure to £3,500 per annum and settled her debts many times. Nonetheless, "her attempts to economize appear to have been unavailing".

She died on 25 July 1821 in Cheltenham, Gloucestershire, and was buried at Middleton Stoney in the Villiers family vault.

== Children ==
- Lady Charlotte Anne Villiers (1771–1808), married Lord William Russell in 1789, and had issue
- Lady Anne Barbara Frances Villiers (1772–1832), married William Henry Lambton and had issue, including John Lambton, 1st Earl of Durham; married secondly Hon. Charles Wyndham, son of Charles Wyndham, 2nd Earl of Egremont
- George Child Villiers, 5th Earl of Jersey (1773–1859), married Lady Sarah Sophia Fane daughter of John Fane, 10th Earl of Westmorland and Sarah Child, only child of Robert Child, the principal shareholder in the banking firm Child & Co.
- Lady Caroline Elizabeth Villiers (1774–1835), married firstly Henry Paget, 1st Marquess of Anglesey and had issue; she divorced him in the Scottish courts in 1809 and married secondly, George Campbell, 6th Duke of Argyll. They are ancestors of Diana, Princess of Wales, and of her sons, Princes William, the Prince of Wales, and Harry, Duke of Sussex.
- Lady Georgiana Villiers (died young)
- Lady Sarah Villiers (b. 1779), married Charles Nathaniel Bayley in 1799
- Hon. William Augustus Henry Villiers (1780–1813), died unmarried in America, having assumed the surname of Mansel in 1802, pursuant to the will of Louisa Barbara Venables-Vernon, Baroness Vernon, daughter of Barbara Villiers and Bussy Mansel, 4th Baron Mansel
- Lady Elizabeth Villiers (d. 1810)
- Lady Frances Elizabeth Villiers (1786–1866), married John Ponsonby, 1st Viscount Ponsonby, in 1803
- Lady Harriet Villiers (1788–1870), married Richard Bagot, Bishop of Oxford in 1806, and had issue

== Screen portrayal ==
Lady Jersey was played by Caroline Blakiston in the TV series Prince Regent in 1979.

== See also ==
- English royal mistress
