= Daniel Gardner =

English painter

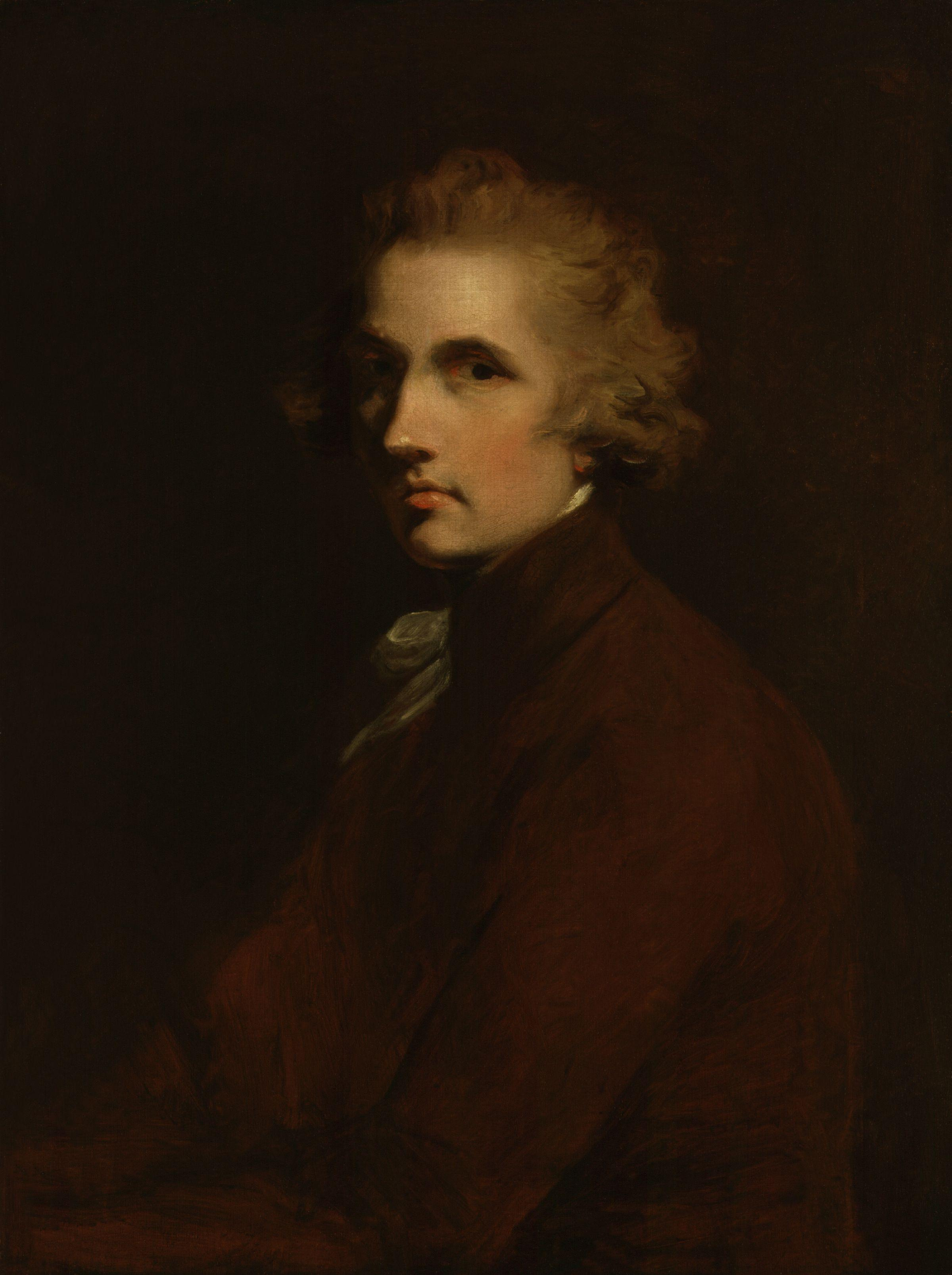
- c. 1780 self-portrait
- Born: Daniel Gardner; 1750; Kendal, Westmorland
- Died: 8 July 1805 (aged 54–55); London, England
- Education: Royal Academy of Arts
- Known for: Portraitist

Daniel Gardner (1750 – 8 July 1805) was an English painter, best known for his work as a portraitist. He established a fashionable studio in Bond Street, London, specializing in small-scale portraits in pastel, crayons or gouache, often borrowing Reynolds' poses. By some critics Gardner is regarded as a notable artist who, however, was not an accurate draughtsman if it came to figure work especially to facial construction in some of his pastels. For others, on the other hand, it is this special looseness or facile elegance which represents the uniqueness of Gardner's style, and in which they see an anticipation of impressionism.

== Education and career ==
Daniel Gardner was a pupil of George Romney. However, Gardner used to say that he learned very little from him. Around 1767, Gardner moved to London, where in 1770 he became a student at the Royal Academy of Arts. There he was taught by Johann Zoffany, Nathaniel Dance-Holland, Benjamin West, Giovanni Battista Cipriani and Francesco Bartolozzi. In 1771, Gardner won a silver medal at the Royal Academy of Arts for the portrait of an old man. The portrait was styled as a drawing in the Royal Academy Catalogue and therefore it very possibly was a work in pastel. Gardner's grandson, George Harrison Gardner, said in a letter dated 1856 that the subject of this portrait was The Chained Captive. Apart from this picture, no further works by Gardner were shown at the major London exhibitions. At that time, Gardner was residing at 11, Cockspur Street, Pall Mall, London. Later in his life, he resided at two different addresses in New Bond Street, London, no. 120 and no. 142, removing to the latter in 1781, but in 1793 he transferred his residence to lodgings at 3, Beak Street, Golden Square, London.

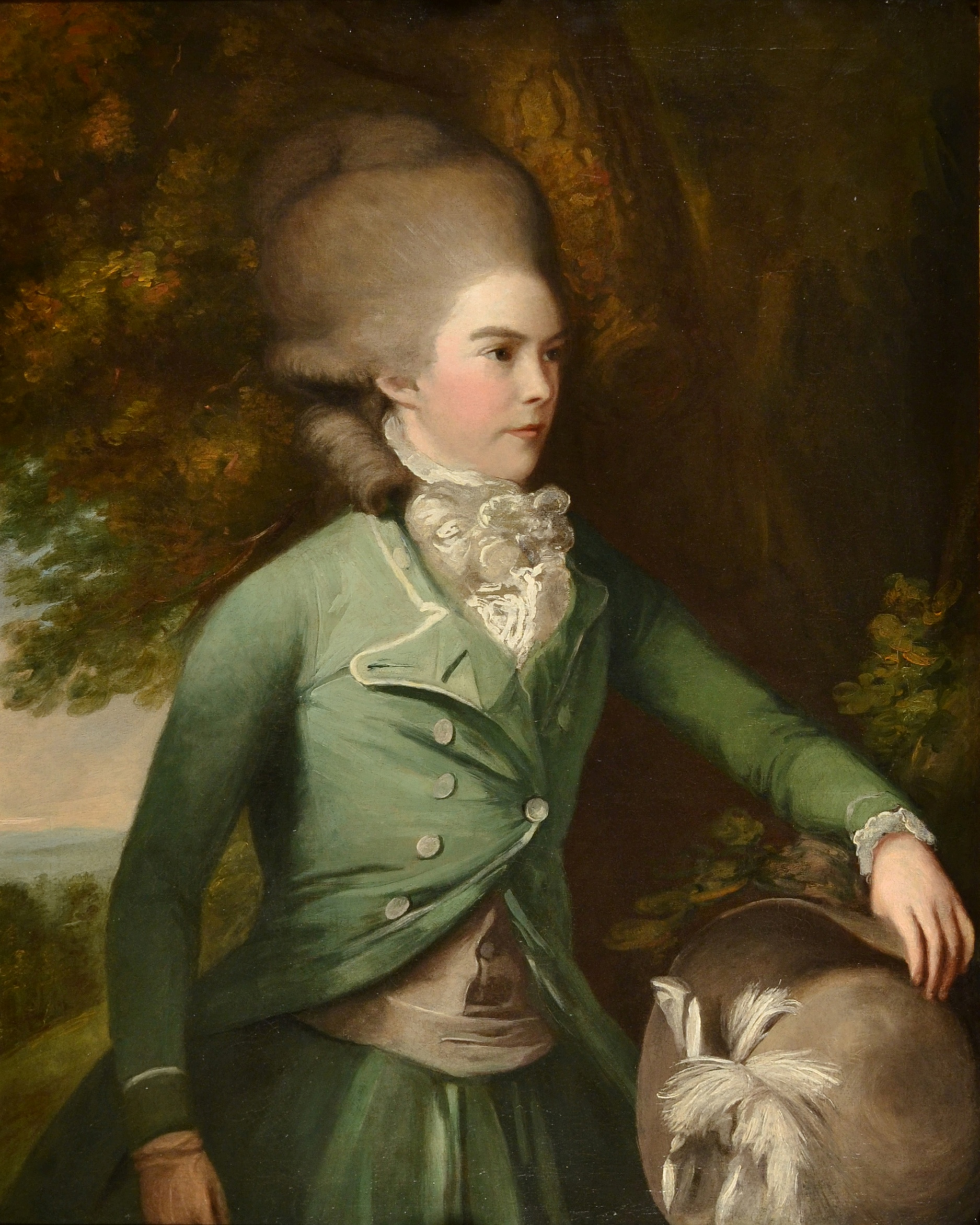
Jane Gordon, Duchess of Gordon, née Lady Jane Maxwell. Daniel Gardner portrayed the Duchess in a green riding habit around 1780 (oil on canvas)

Around 1773, Daniel Gardner worked with Joshua Reynolds. It is said that in several of Joshua Reynolds' pictures, the trees or foliage were the work of Gardner. Reynolds' late style clearly influenced Gardner's work in terms of composition, handling, and conception of figures. However, if it comes to figure work Gardner was never such an accurate draughtsman like Reynolds was. It is quite easy to believe that Gardner was responsible in many instances for the landscape backgrounds, for the trees, for the tree trunks and for the wreaths of flowers in Reynolds' paintings. But it is not at all likely that Daniel Gardner was responsible for any of the figure work in the paintings of Joshua Reynolds.

Gardner became very popular as a portraitist. He portrayed some of the most famous personalities of his days like Jane Gordon, Duchess of Gordon, Georgiana Cavendish, Duchess of Devonshire, Charles Cornwallis, 1st Marquess Cornwallis, Elizabeth Lamb, Viscountess Melbourne, Frances Villiers, Countess of Jersey, Angelica Kauffman and Lord George Gordon. Therefore, it does not come as a surprise that Gardner appears to have made money very rapidly. His pictures were very popular, he was able to paint quickly, and he got good prices for them. He spent a considerable part of his time away from home, having adopted the practice of staying in the house with his patron, when he could paint various members of the family, and sometimes of the neighbouring gentry as well. During all this time, Gardner was carefully saving up his money, and as soon as ever he was able to do so, he purchased on 10 December 1787 the old home of his parents in New Street, Kendal, and the property adjacent to it. Gardner continued this practice of buying houses and land for many years, until he had accumulated a substantial fortune and finally could afford to retire.

In particular, Gardner was well known as a pastellist. However, towards the end of the 18th century he started to paint in a technique that included oil paint, crayons, gouache and pastel. This technique was later copied by several other painters like John Downman, John James Masquerier and Peter Romney (1743–1777), the brother of George Romney. However, Gardner painted large paintings only in oil. These are rare and do not often appear on the art market. According to an original letter from Gardner, dated: London, 12 November 1779, and now preserved in the J. H. Anderdon Collection in the British Museum, Gardner painted his very first oil painting in 1779. He speaks in this letter of an oil picture that he had just completed, as "absolutely the first oil picture that I ever finished." The gentleman shown on this very first oil picture was Philip Egerton of Oulton (1738–1786), bareheaded, and holding a hoe in his hand.

It is said that Gardner made many of his own colours from strange herbs, which he collected in the woods, and especially from powders that he made from bark and from fungi. However, the majority of the dry colours used by Gardner he appears to have obtained from "Messrs. Robertson & Miller, 51. Long Acre, London", as there are many allusions to their prices in his notebooks.

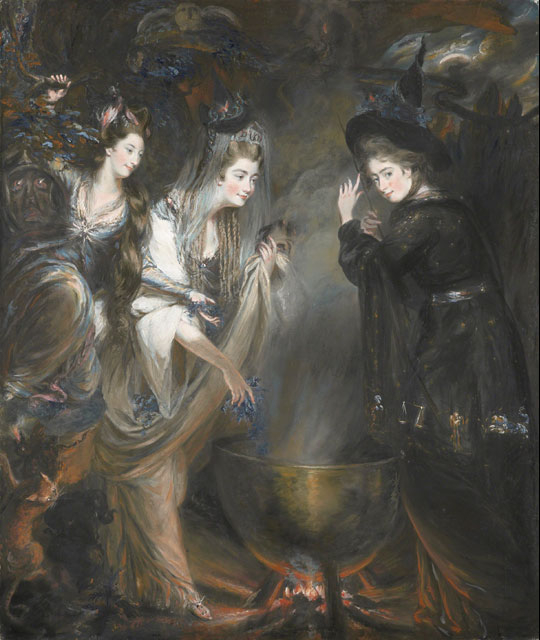
Elizabeth Lamb, Viscountess Melbourne with Georgiana Cavendish, Duchess of Devonshire and Anne Seymour Damer in Witches Round the Cauldron, portrayed by Daniel Gardner in gouache (1775).

Gardner hardly ever signed his works. As a result, his works were later, mainly in the 19th century, often attributed to his colleagues Joshua Reynolds or Thomas Gainsborough, since they were better known within the general public. However, this does not come as a surprise if one takes into account that Gardner worked with both, Joshua Reynolds as well as Thomas Gainsborough. Marion Spielmann, in his work on British Portrait Painting, speaks of the connection between Thomas Gainsborough and Daniel Gardner. Spielmann refers to the "facile elegance of Gardner's work, which brings him closer to Gainsborough," but goes on to say that "his handling was more deliberate and smoother than Gainsborough's, and wholly lacking, of course, in the feathery touches which the greater man came to adopt." "Perhaps," he adds, "the occasional looseness of Gainsborough's drawing was too easily identified with that of Gardner." Spielman, however, is bound to notice "the extraordinary carelessness and defiance of facial construction" that is characteristic of some of Gardner's pastels, and points out that Gainsborough could never have painted in that method, and could never have made such mistakes as Gardner made in his haste.

Samuel Redgrave wrote about Daniel Gardner: "He had a nice perception of beauty and character, and composed with elegance." Additonally, William Hayley wrote in his Essay on Painting, Epistle II:

Let candid Justice our attention lead
To the soft crayon of the graceful Read;
Nor, Gardner, shall the Muse, in haste, forget
Thy Taste and Ease; tho' with a fond regret
She pays, while here the Crayon’s pow’r she notes
A sigh of homage to the Shade of Coates.

The president of the Royal Cambrian Academy of Art in Conwy, Sir Cuthbert C. Grundy (1846–1946), together with his brother John R. G. Grundy († 1915), founder of the Grundy Art Gallery in Blackpool, considered Daniel Gardner the most successful English pastellist of the 18th century, surpassing Joshua Reynolds in freedom and spontaneity, and John Downman in attaining finer and richer colour.

Many of Gardners portraits were later engraved by engravers like Francis Haward (1759–1797), his brother-in-law, Thomas Watson (1750–1781) or William Ridley (1764–1838) or they were reproduced as mezzotints. From a financial point of view this was probably more lucrative for Gardner than the execution of the originals.

Since Gardner could afford to retire at the height of his fame, he was out of the public eye and was nearly forgotten as an artist when he died in 1805. It was not until 1911 when his name and fame again came back into public awareness when his great-granddaughter, Miss H. B. Gardner, sold his portrait of Elizabeth Haward, Gardner's sister-in-law, through Christie's for the then record price of 2.200 guineas to Mr. Adolph Hirsch. Gardner portrayed his sister-in-law in oil. This portrait is said to be one of Gardner's finest works.

== Private life ==
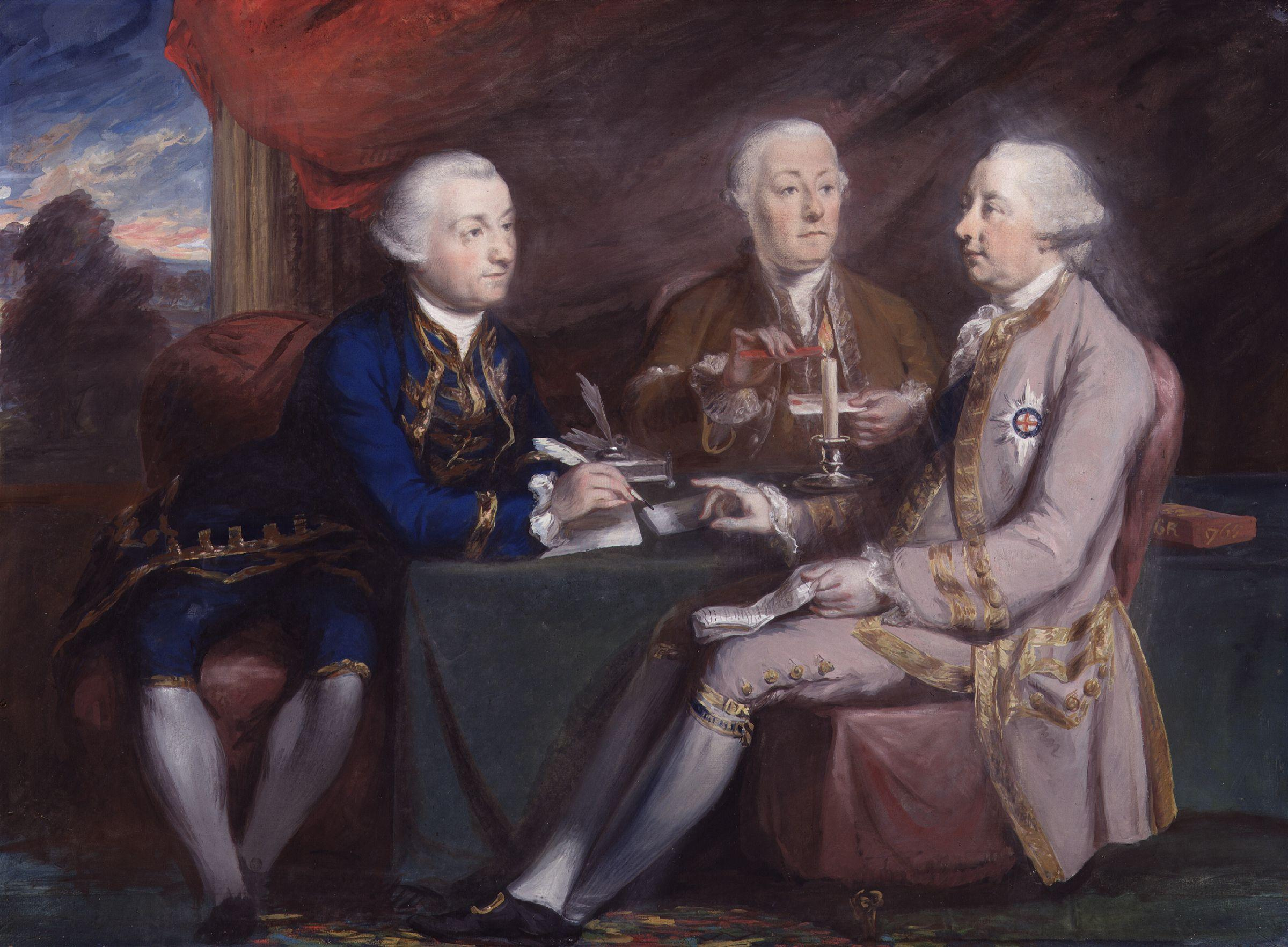
George Montagu-Dunk, 2nd Earl of Halifax in conversation with his secretaries. From left to right: Edward Sedgwick, Lovell Stanhope († 1783), and the 2nd Earl of Halifax, portrayed with the Order of the Garter shown on the left side of his coat. Underneath his left knee the Earl wears the garter that goes with it. The Halifax Regional Municipality was named after the 2nd Earl of Halifax in 1749. Also the Halifax River is named after him. Daniel Gardner portrayed the Earl and his secretaries in gouache around 1767.

Daniel Gardner was a Westmorland man, born in Redman's Yard, Stricklandgate, Kirkby-Kendal in 1750. His father Caleb was a cordwainer, his mother was Elizabeth Redman, sister of Mr. Alderman Redman of Kendal, an upholsterer, with whom George Romney's father John Romney, a cabinet maker, was connected in business. The members of the families of the two future portraitists, the Gardner's and the Romney's, knew each other well and it is said that one of the first portraits George Romney painted when he was still under twelve years old was the one of Daniel Gardner's mother. Mrs. Gardner, interested in art and impressed by the work of the young boy, used all her influence to encourage George Romney to persevere, eventually interceding with his father to let painting be Romney's sole pursuit and profession. It was in the house of the Gardner's that George Romney first met Daniel Gardner, who later became his pupil.

Daniel Gardner married his wife, whose first name was either Ann or Nancy, Haward on 8 October 1776. She was the sister of the engraver Francis Haward (born 1759). Gardner and his wife had two sons. However, only the elder son George (born 1778) survived. Gardner's wife died shortly after the birth of the second son in 1781. He never fully recovered from this tragic incident.

After the early death of his wife, Daniel Gardner sent his son George to Kendal, where he was brought up by the Pennington family with whom Daniel Gardner had formed a close relationship. William Pennington of Dowker & Richardson, Attorneys, also looked after Gardner's business affairs in Kendal. Evidence of this friendship is a double portrait that Daniel Gardner painted around 1780 showing William Pennington and himself. George Gardner became a barrister and a burgess of Kendal. He later married Harriet Anne Cumming. They had a son called George Harrison Gardner, who was born in July 1814 and baptised in April of the following year by the Rev. Robert Blair, the Rector of Barton St. Andrews, Norwich, whose portrait Daniel Gardner painted.

According to The Gentleman's Magazine, Daniel Gardner died on 8 July 1805 from liver failure at 3, Beak Street, Golden Square, London. The European Magazine and London Review also reported his death. In the column of the Monthly Obituary there was the following short note: "Mr. Daniel Gardner, of Warwick-street, Golden-square, formerly an artist." Gardner was buried on 13 July 1805 in the churchyard of St. James's, Piccadilly, London.

The value of his estate, which Gardner left to his only surviving son George, was declared at £10,000. However, it seems probable, from what his contemporaries thought about Gardner, that he had a far larger fortune to leave behind than would be represented by a sum of £10,000. It is possible that the whole of the Kendal property may have been already placed in the name of his son, and therefore did not appear in the declaration that was made on the decease of the father, or there may have been some way of avoiding a declaration as to the value of his landed estate.

== Character ==
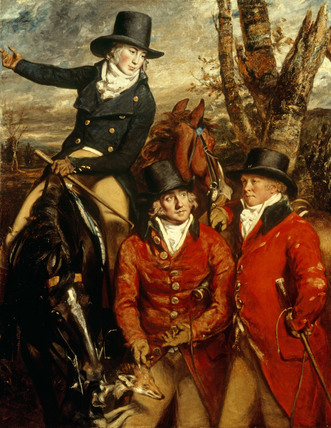
The Heathcote Hunting Group is regarded as Daniel Gardner's masterpiece in oil (1790). It shows the Rev. William Heathcote (1772–1802), on horseback (son of the 3rd Baronet); Sir William Heathcote of Hursley, 3rd Baronet (1746–1819), holding his horse and whip; and Major Vincent Hawkins Gilbert, M.F.H., holding a Fox's mask. The Heathcote's family seat was Hursley House.

Daniel Gardner was an eccentric. He sometimes would ask his sitters to show up in his studio at five o'clock in the morning. There he would only allow the sitters to be present. In his studio, he had a specially constructed easel with locking shutters since he refused to allow his sitters to see the work in progress. Gardner never travelled without this special easel. If he stayed in the house of his patron to do some portraits of him and his family, he would even make it a condicio sine qua non to have his proper lockable workroom.

Gardner did not mix easily with his fellow artists, who viewed him as parsimonious, but he did form a close friendship with Joshua Reynolds and John Constable. Gardner portrayed Constable in 1796.

== Exhibitions (posthumous) ==
- Daniel Gardner, Amateur Art Society, Hamilton Place, Piccadilly, London, 1910

This exhibition included 70 small portraits owned by Lady Strachey which were formerly in the collection of Lord Carlingford who purchased the pictures from Anne Eliza Dixon, Daniel Gardner's granddaughter. This collection was sold in 1911 at Christie's, and realised about a thousand pounds sterling.

- Daniel Gardner, 12 pastels from the collection of Lady Strachey, Cottier Gallery, New York, 1913
- Daniel Gardner, Abbot Hall Art Gallery, Kendal, 1962
- Daniel Gardner, 1750–1805, Kenwood House, London, 1972

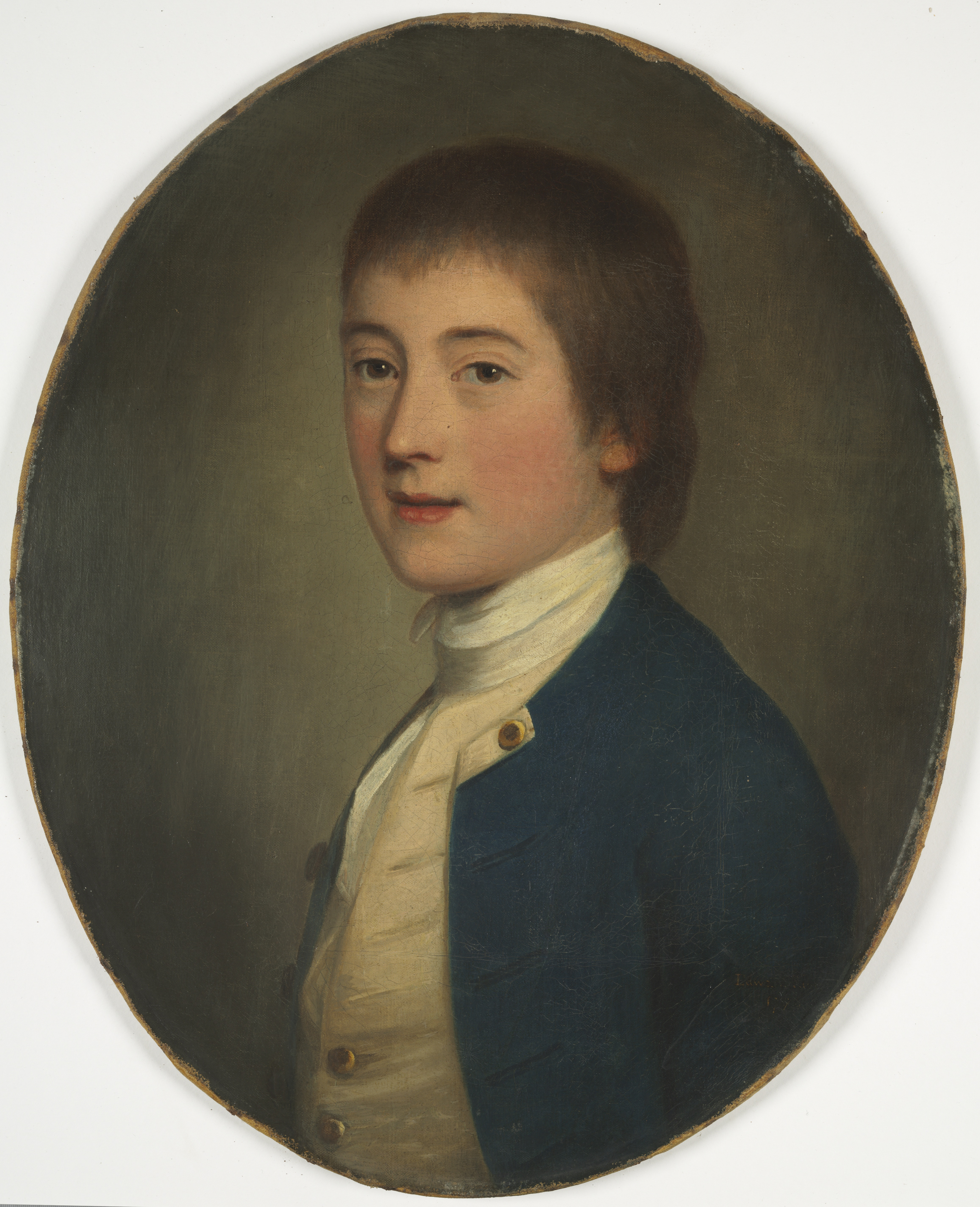
Portrait of Midshipman Edward Riou, 1776 by Daniel Gardner. Mitchell Library, State Library of New South Wales, Sydney.

== Collections ==
Works by Daniel Gardner form part of the following collections:

- Abbot Hall Art Gallery in Kendal
- National Portrait Gallery in London
- Tate Britain
- Victoria and Albert Museum
- Montacute House
- Mitchell Library, State Library of New South Wales, Sydney

== Literature ==
- George Charles Williamson: Daniel Gardner, painter in pastel and gouache: A brief account of his life and works. John Lane, The Bodley Head, Vigo St., W, London, 1921
