= Sir John Taylor, 1st Baronet =

Jamaican-born planter

Sir John Taylor Bt FRS
- Sir John Taylor, 1st Baronet, by Robert Edge Pine, c. 1770s
- Born: 1745; Colony of Jamaica, British Empire
- Died: 8 May 1786 (aged 40–41); Lyssons, Colony of Jamaica, British Empire
- Children: 6
- Relatives: Simon Taylor (brother); George Watson-Taylor (son-in-law); Simon Watson-Taylor (grandson)

Sir John Taylor, 1st Baronet FRS (1745 – 8 May 1786) was a Jamaican-born planter who was a fellow of the Royal Society and was created a baronet of Lysson Hall in Jamaica. He lived in London but he died in Jamaica.

== Background ==
Taylor was born in the Colony of Jamaica in 1745 to Patrick Talizour and Martha Taylor, the daughter of George Taylor of Caymanas, Jamaica. His Scottish father had been born with the surname Tailzour in Borrowfield, but he Anglicised his name to Taylor when they married.

== Relationship with his brother ==
John's eldest brother, Simon Taylor, used their father's inheritance to purchase a number of sugar plantations, bought slaves, and increased the family wealth. He also became an attorney in Jamaica who represented a large number of absentee plantation owners. Simon became reputedly the richest person in Jamaica, becoming a member of the House of Assembly of Jamaica in the process. Simon's wealth, derived from sugar plantations, funded John's extravagant lifestyle in Europe.

John Taylor became a baronet on 1 September 1778. In the same year he married an heiress, Elizabeth Goddin Haughton only daughter of Philip Haughton and Mary Brissett, owners of sugar plantations Orange, Venture and Unity in Hanover Parish, in western Jamaica. They eventually had six children.

While Simon carefully built up his sugar plantations in Jamaica, he was often critical of his younger brother's extravagant lifestyle.

== John Taylor's death ==
Simon persuaded his brother John to return to Jamaica to take control of his estates in Hanover, which were failing without his close attention. However, within a year of arriving in Jamaica, John Taylor died in 1786 during a visit to Simon's Lyssons plantation in the eastern end of the island. His title was taken by his son, Simon.

== Simon's inheritance ==
The elder Simon Taylor died in 1813 and left most of his estates to John's son, Sir Simon Richard Brissett Taylor, 2nd baronet. However, Simon the elder also made some provisions for his mixed-race family. John Taylor's son lived only until 1815 which meant the end of the baronetcy. The fortune was inherited by John Taylor's daughter, Anna Susannah, who had married George Watson, who then added her surname to his.

== Legacy ==
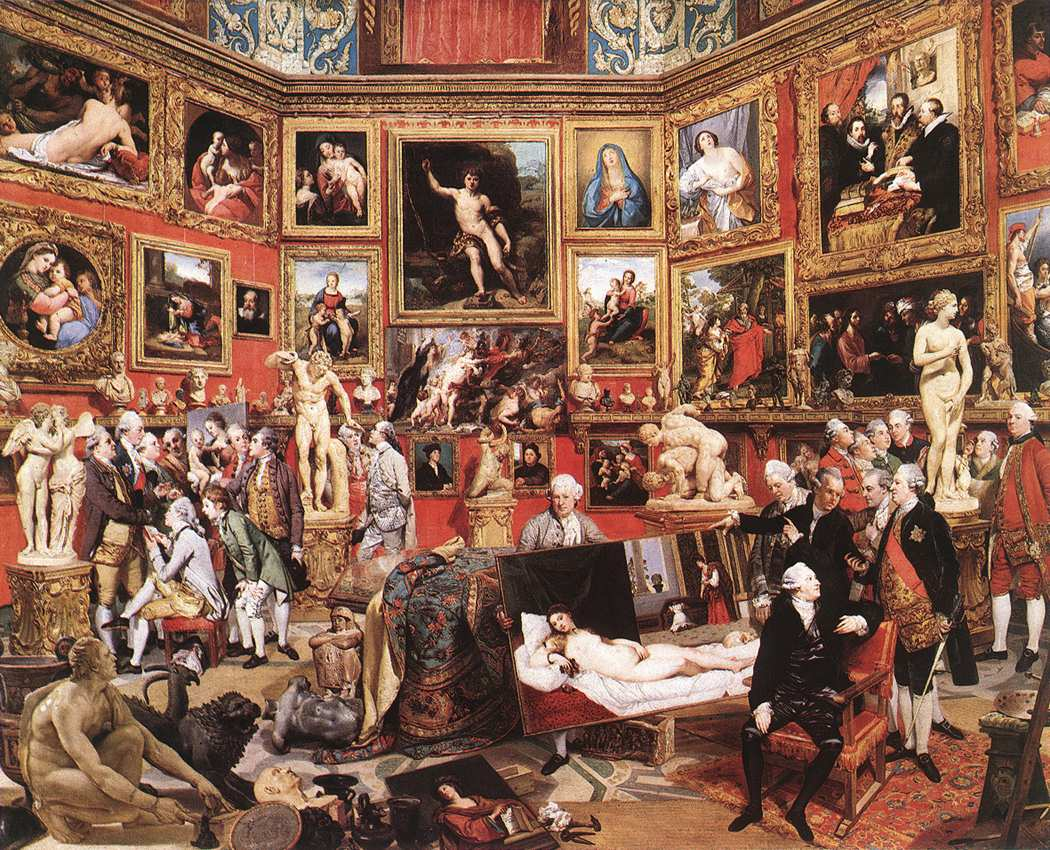
The Tribuna of the Uffizi by Johann Zoffany. Place cursor over artworks or persons to identify them.

John Taylor was captured in a painting by Johann Zoffany of the Tribuna of the Uffizi in Florence in the 1770s. He appears to the right of the painting with Thomas Patch and Sir Horace Mann, 1st Baronet.

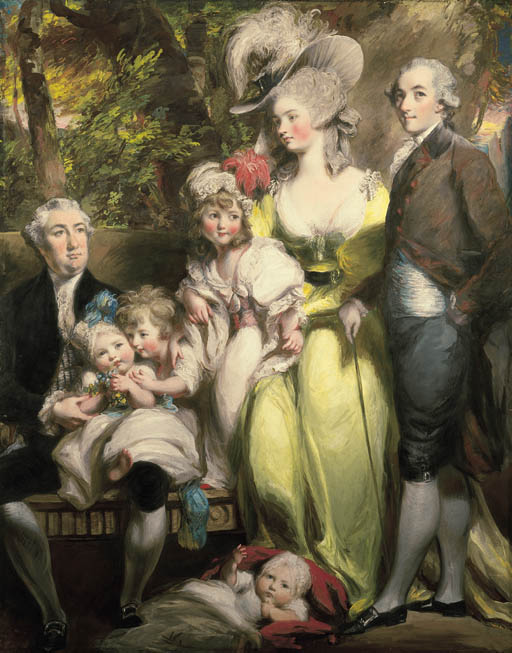
The family of Sir John Taylor, 1785, by Daniel Gardner. Sir John Taylor stands at right with his wife Elizabeth, his brother Simon Taylor (seated at left), and four of his children.

In 1785, the year before he died, Taylor and his family were portrayed by Daniel Gardner in a large group portrait executed in pencil, pastel and bodycolour. The group consisted of Taylor, his wife Elizabeth, his brother Simon Taylor, and four of his children: Simon Richard Brisset, Anna Susanna, Elizabeth and Maria. Simon became the second and last baronet of Lysson Hall.

Robert Edge Pine also painted Taylor in a three-quarter-length portrait, depicting him in Van Dyck dress holding a feathered hat and walking cane. The portrait was engraved in mezzotint by William Dickinson; an impression is held by the National Portrait Gallery (NPG D40846). The painting was on loan at Culzean Castle from 1982 to 2016 and, since 2026, has been in the private collection of Anthony Watson.

In addition to the paintings, Taylor is also a key figure in correspondence that is now preserved as a record of life in Jamaica. The letters are from Simon to John and they record world events, the state of the plantations and complaints from Simon that he is doing all the work and John is spending all the money.

Baronetage of Great Britain
New creation	Baronet (of Lysson Hall); 1778–1786	Succeeded by Simon Taylor
