= George Watson-Taylor =

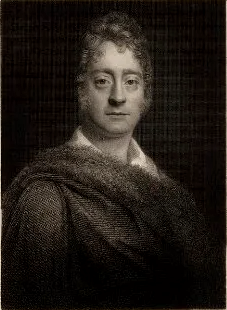
- Engraved portrait of George Watson-Taylor, after an original from 1808
- Born: 1771
- Died: 6 June 1841 (aged 69–70); Edinburgh
- Occupations: writer, plantation owner, politician, collector

George Watson-Taylor (1771 – 6 June 1841), was a British-born Jamaican plantation owner, politician and art collector. In 1810, he married into the family of the planter Sir John Taylor, 1st Baronet, in time adding the Taylor surname to his own, and becoming the richest planter on Jamaica. He bought houses in Cavendish Square, London, and Erlestoke Park, near Devizes, Wiltshire. As MP for a number of constituencies, where he was brought in without contests, he supported the Tory administration, and campaigned for the retention of slavery.

Watson-Taylor was a renowned fine art collector. His finances later collapsed, and he died on 6 June 1841, in Edinburgh.

== Early life and education ==
He was the fourth son of George Watson of Saul's River, Jamaica and was educated at Lincoln's Inn from 1788. He matriculated at St. Mary Hall, Oxford in 1791.

== Political career ==
In 1815, George Watson changed his surname to Watson-Taylor. He was a Member (MP) for Newport, Isle of Wight, 15 April 1816 – 1818. There the seat was controlled by Sir Leonard Worsley-Holmes, 9th Baronet, who returned family members and "friends of government". On arrival in the House of Commons, Watson-Taylor was immediately elected to the standing committee of the Society of West India Planters and Merchants.

Then it was Seaford 1818–1820. In this case Watson-Taylor bought a half-interest in the constituency, from John Leach, sharing the seat with Charles Rose Ellis. Next was East Looe, controlled by the Buller family. In 1820, Sir Edward Buller, 1st Baronet, retired as MP, bringing in Watson-Taylor, with Thomas Potter Macqueen, as loyal to the Liverpool administration. He was there until the 1826 general election, when he made way for Lord Perceval. He was in that election unopposed at Devizes, where Bucknall Estcourt was moving to Oxford and backed him. He remained there until 1832.

He began his career as a member of the committee of West India planters and merchants, and opposed the abolition of slavery. When the slaves were emancipated in the 1830s, he received compensation exceeding £20,000 for over 1,000 slaves in Jamaica.

== Later life and death ==
With inherited wealth from his wife's family, Watson-Taylor was spendthrift and failed to live within his means. By 1832, he was heavily in debt, and was compelled to auction off his personal property. Bankrupted, he fled to Amsterdam. He then found a refuge, the debtors' sanctuary attached to the Abbey at Holyrood Palace, Scotland. He died, still in financial difficulties, in Edinburgh, on 6 June 1841, aged 69 or 70. His estates at Erlestoke and in Jamaica were passed to his wife. She died in 1853.

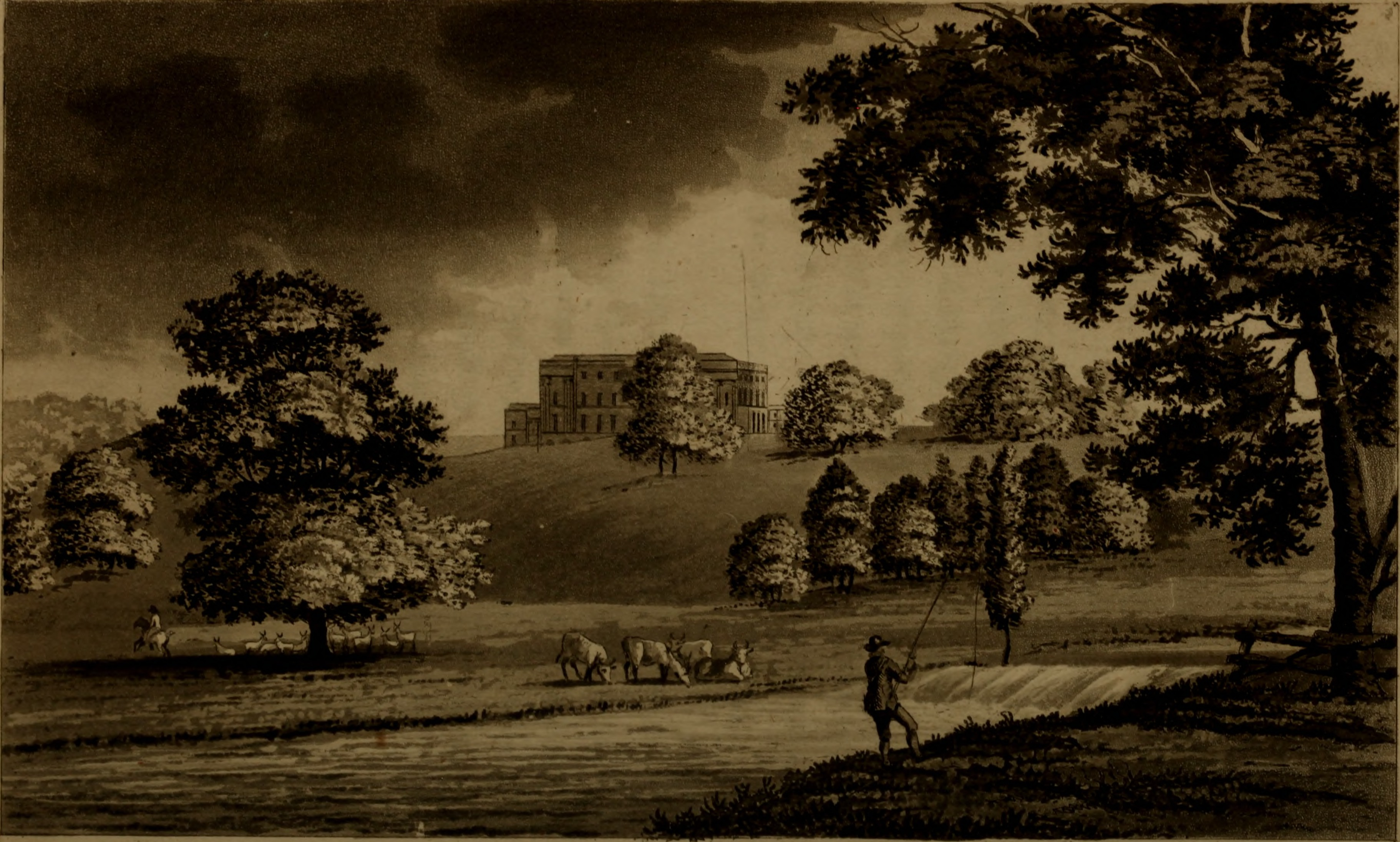
Erle Stoke House, 1792 engraving, owned by Anna Watson-Taylor at her death

== Collecting, residences and interests ==
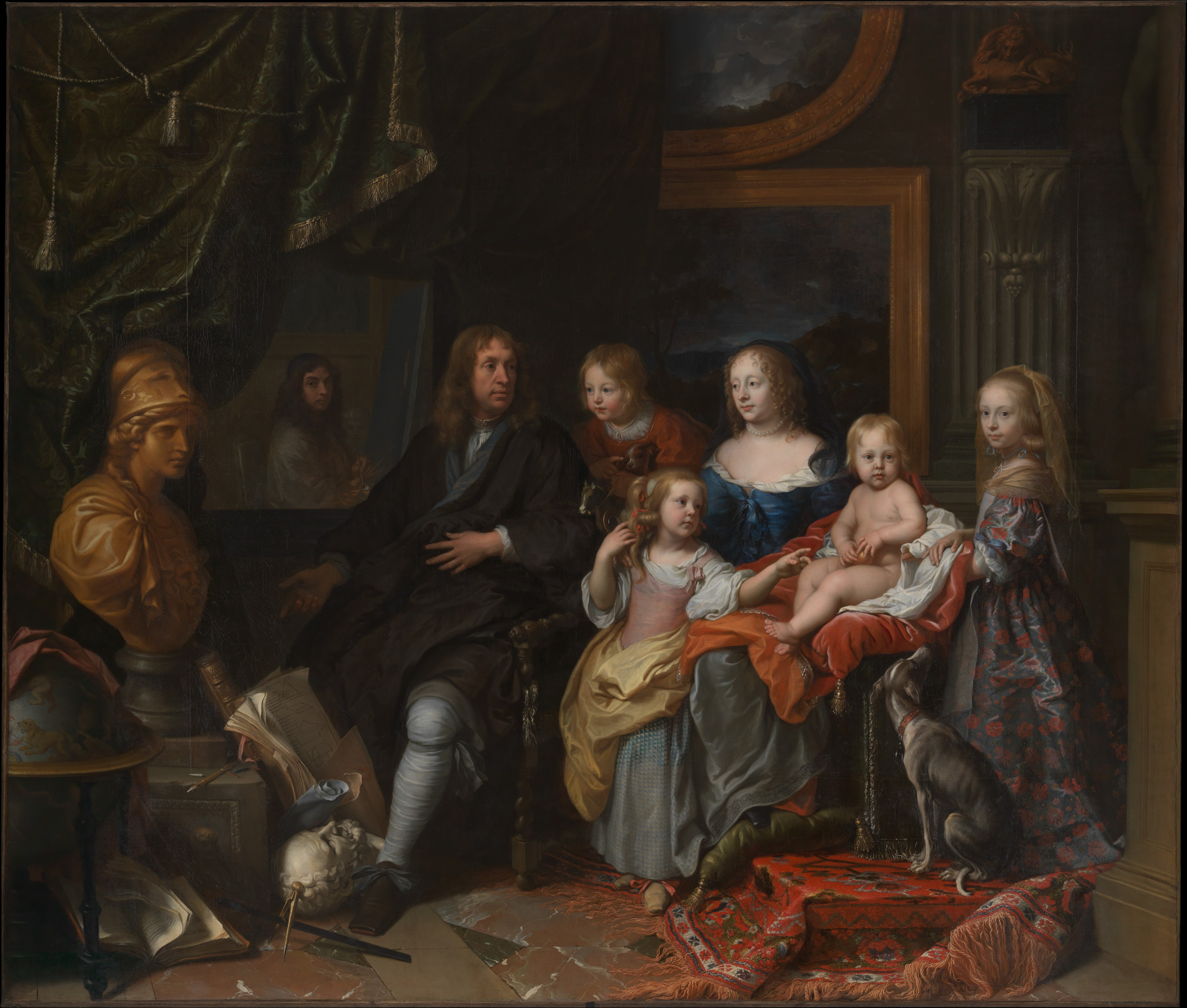
Everhard Jabach and His Family by Charles LeBrun, bought 1816 by George Watson-Taylor, now in the Metropolitan Museum of Art

Watson-Taylor has been described as a "great collector and connoisseur". He purchased from Henry Hope a picture by Jacob van der Ulft in early 1811, and made further acquisitions from the sale later that year that followed Hope's death in April. His collection of Old Master paintings included The Vision of Saint Jerome by Parmigianino (National Gallery, London, no. NG 33); The Graham Children and The Shrimp Girl, both by William Hogarth (National Gallery, London, nos. NG 4756 and NG 1162 respectively); and Don Justino de Neve by Murillo (National Gallery, London, no. NG 6448). He was noted also for collections of sculpture and French furniture. He commissioned in 1816 one of the few life-size bronze casts of the ancient marble sculpture of Laocoön and his sons, which was cast by the bronze founder Carbonneaux from the marble then briefly in Paris. Also in 1816, living at 5 Savile Row, he bought eight more pictures from the further sale of Hope's collection, including the group portrait of the family of Everhard Jabach acquired in 2014 by the Metropolitan Museum of Art, New York (inv. no. 2014.250); and in 1820 he moved into Hope's former home on Harley Street. There he was a neighbour of Henry Philip Hope.

This Harley Street house is also from its corner location considered part of Cavendish Square. It had been built in the 1720s for the 1st Duke of Chandos, by Edward Shepherd. "Extending some way down the east side of Harley Street, the house occupied the site of what had originally been planned as the north-west wing of a great palace for the Duke of Chandos, occupying the whole north side of the square." Hope had bought it in 1794, and Watson-Taylor bought it from Hope's executors in 1817. He had also owned a house in Hanover Square.

From 1821 to 1824, the Watson-Taylors entertained lavishly and fashionably in this house. Then money troubles had an impact, and the house was closed up from 1825. From his collection of old master paintings, Watson-Taylor held a major sale in 1823. This was of 131 paintings from this London house.

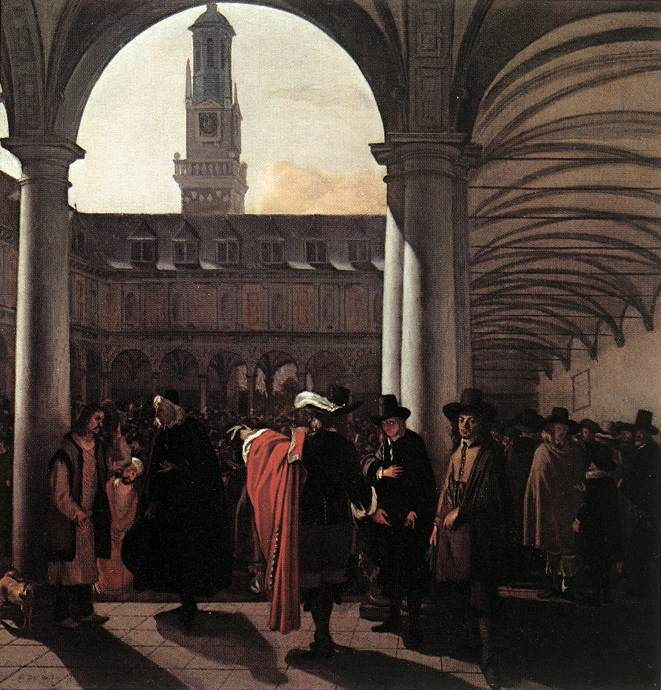
The Courtyard of the Old Exchange in Amsterdam by Emanuel de Witte, among the paintings sold by George Watson-Taylor in 1823, as of 2023 on loan at the Museum Boijmans Van Beuningen

George IV took a particular interest in Watson-Taylor's furniture collection, part of which was put on sale in 1825. He was at this time improving the private apartments at Windsor Castle. He was advised by William Seguier, believed also to have been used by Watson-Taylor for furniture acquisitions, and Charles Long. He made significant purchases at the sale. By this time the Watson-Taylors when in London lived in Grafton Street, Mayfair.

Watson-Taylor was elected a Fellow of the Royal Society in 1826, as "a Gentleman versed in many branches of Science and Literature, being desirous of becoming a Fellow of the Royal Society of London, ... and likely to prove an useful and valuable Member". In 1830, he arranged to have privately printed Pieces of Poetry: With Two Dramas, a collection of his short poems, some of them humorous or parodies of other works.

In 1832, Watson-Taylor was forced by further financial difficulties to sell the contents of Erlestoke House. His library was sold in at least two parts by R. H. Evans in London, on 20 March (and five following days) and 14 April (and seven following days); the two sales realised a total of £8,726 9s 6d. His collection of objets de vertu was also sold that year, to some mockery.

== Family ==
In 1810, Watson married Anna Susanna, daughter of Sir John Taylor, 1st Baronet of Lysson Hall, Jamaica. They had four sons and one daughter. Considerable wealth came to him from the Jamaican sugar cane plantations of Sir John's brother Simon Taylor, who died in 1813. He was granted the additional surname of Taylor by royal licence of 19 June 1815, following the death earlier that year of Sir Simon Richard Brissett Taylor, 2nd Baronet, whom his wife, the eldest niece, had succeeded. A coat of arms as Watson-Taylor was also then granted to him, under the signature of the Prince Regent.

Escutcheon of Watson-Taylor, granted 1815

The inheritance made George and his wife wealthy. The couple bought a landed estate in Wiltshire for £200,000, and a house in London which they renovated, the total cost coming to £68,000. They socialised with King William IV, and hosted the future Queen Victoria.

Of their sons:

- Simon Watson Taylor (born 1811) sat as MP for Devizes for a brief period.
- John Walter Watson-Taylor was born 1813, died 1832. John Gibson made a bust of him, in 1816, now in the Victoria & Albert Museum. Further busts from that year attributed to Gibson are of his younger brother George (as George Jerome) and sister Isabella.
- George Graeme Watson-Taylor, third son, married 1847 Victorine Joudioux, died 1865.
- Emelius Watson-Taylor, youngest son, died 1879. Edward Hodges Baily made a bust of him, in 1825.

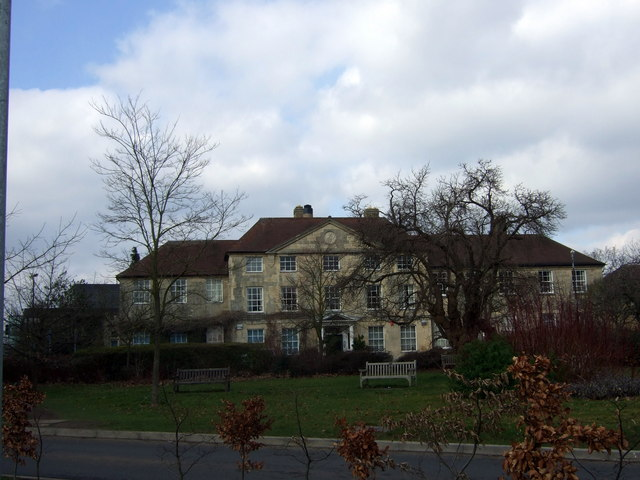
Headington Manor House, 2009 photograph

The daughter was Isabella. She died unmarried in 1892 at Erlestoke Park, Wiltshire, leaving £69,000, owner of Headington Manor House, Oxfordshire. It had previously been owned by her brother Emilius, who bought it in 1867.
