= Peter Romney =

English painter

Peter Romney (1 June 1743 – May 1777) was an English painter.

== Biography ==
The younger brother of George Romney, he was born at Dalton-in-Furness on 1 June 1743. He is said to have shown a precocious talent both with pen and pencil, but such of his verses as have survived are puerile enough. When he was sixteen his more famous brother, who had just started in practice at Kendal on his own account, took Peter as his apprentice. On Romney's departure for London in 1762, Peter remained for a time at Kendal, painting portraits at a guinea a head. In 1765, when Romney visited his family in the north, he took Peter back to London with him, but was finally obliged to send him home, as the young man earned nothing, and seems to have been the cause of a good deal of expense and anxiety to his brother. Having got together a few prints in London, Peter copied them in oils, and raffled them, thus raising money to take him to Manchester, where he started in practice as a portrait-painter. His success in Manchester was slight, and he removed to Ipswich, where his career was cut short by his arrest for debt.

Romney next tried his luck at Cambridge, but there again got into difficulties. George Romney generously discharged his debts, and he started once more at Southport. His money troubles and various unfortunate—and in some cases disreputable—love affairs seem to have so preyed on his mind that he took to drink. Prematurely broken in health, he died in May 1777, in his thirty-fourth year. He chose crayons as his medium, to avoid possible competition with his brother, and is said at one time to have seemed a likely rival to Francis Cotes Lord John Clinton, Lord Pelham, Lord Hyde, and Lord and Lady Montford were among his more notable sitters. A portrait group by George Romney of his two brothers, James and Peter, was sold at Christie's on 25 May 1894.
