= Simon Taylor (sugar planter) =

Jamaican planter and politician (1739–1813)

Member of the Jamaican House of Assembly
- In office October 1784 – 14 April 1813
- Constituency: St Thomas-in-the-East
- In office November 1763 – 1781
- Constituency: Kingston

Personal details
- Born: Simon Taylor; 23 December 1739 Kingston, Jamaica
- Died: 14 April 1813 (aged 73) Port Royal, Jamaica
- Resting place: Lyssons, St. Thomas-in-the-East, Jamaica
- Relations: John (brother)
- Parent(s): Patrick Tailzour; Martha Taylor
- Education: Eton College

Simon Taylor (23 December 1739 – 14 April 1813) was a Jamaican planter and politician. Taylor was the wealthiest planter on the island, according to its governor, and died leaving an estate estimated at over £1 million, equivalent to £59,980,568 in 2025.

== Early life and background ==
Simon Taylor was born in Jamaica in 1739, the first-born son of Patrick Tailzour who migrated to Jamaica from Forfarshire in Scotland, and anglicised his surname to Taylor. Patrick married Martha, the daughter of a successful white Jamaican sugar merchant, George Hanbury Taylor and Mary of Caymanas, Jamaica. Patrick took over the business of his father-in-law, and prospered as a sugar merchant in Kingston, the capital.

In January 1740, one month after Simon's birth, he was baptised in an Anglican church. When he was 12 years old, he was sent to England for his education. Whilst attending Eton College, one of the most prestigious boys' schools, his father Patrick died (1754). At 20 years old, Simon Taylor returned to Jamaica to take charge of his father's properties. Patrick had left him a vast fortune of £50,000, making him one of the wealthiest men in the colony. Simon Taylor went on to substantially increase this inheritance.

Simon's younger brother was John Taylor.

== Plantation and gentry ==
In the early 1760s, Taylor began his first foray into sugar and slavery when he converted his father's 900-acre (360 ha) estate at Lyssons in Saint Thomas in-the-East Parish into a sugar plantation. At the same time, he bought the Llanrumney sugar estate in Saint Mary Parish. In 1771, he bought another sugar estate in St. Thomas, called Holland, containing 430 acres (170 ha) of sugarcane, and including 400 enslaved Africans. Taylor also operated as an "attorney" for several absentee planters for estates such as the Golden Grove estate, owned by Chaloner Arcedeckne. Taylor added to his wealth by charging Arcedeckne substantial sums for his services.

Taylor chose to live on the outskirts the capital Kingston, and bought a property named Prospect Pen, which he made his home. This property is now the official residence of the Office of the Prime Minister of Jamaica, and has been renamed Vale Royal.

== Politics ==
Taylor sat as a representative of the Assembly of Jamaica for most of his adult life. In 1763, he was elected by the white voters of Kingston as one of their three representatives. In the 1760s, he witnessed a standoff between a leader of the Assembly, Nicholas Bourke, and the governor, William Lyttelton, 1st Baron Lyttelton, over who should stand costs for the island's defence. Though Bourke won in the end, and Lyttelton was recalled, Taylor was not a believer in Bourke's stance of openly challenging the British government. From October 1784 until his death in 1813, Taylor was a member of the Jamaican Legislature for the Parish of St. Thomas-in-the-East.

Alongside political representation, Taylor was also Chief Magistrate of St. Thomas-in-the-East, in Morant Bay.

=== Pro-slavery campaigning ===
In the late 1790s was the first known time that Taylor thought of leaving Jamaica for the United States with his slaves, and later mentioned that he should move to the banks of the Mississippi, following the Louisiana Purchase.

Taylor campaigned in favour of retaining the Atlantic slave trade, and he was bitterly disappointed when the British government voted to abolish it in 1807. His health then declined for the remaining years of his life, during which time he took no further active part in Jamaican politics.

By 1807, Taylor's previous expressions to move to the United States with his slaves were put off after reading a book from Englishmen Richard Parkinson, whom published his work with the expressed desire to prevent Britons from “running headlong into misery.”

Taylor opposed attempts by missionaries to spread Christianity among the slaves. One missionary, William James Gardner, described Taylor as "a man of degraded habits". Gardner added that "no planter was ever possessed of more power than this imperious, vulgar man".

By the year of his death (1813), Taylor was in possession of 2,248 enslaved people: 1,212 on his estates in St. Thomas in-the-East; 610 on his Holland Estate; 341 on his Lyssons Estate, and 70 at his main residence, Prospect Pen, Kingston Parish.

== Personal life ==
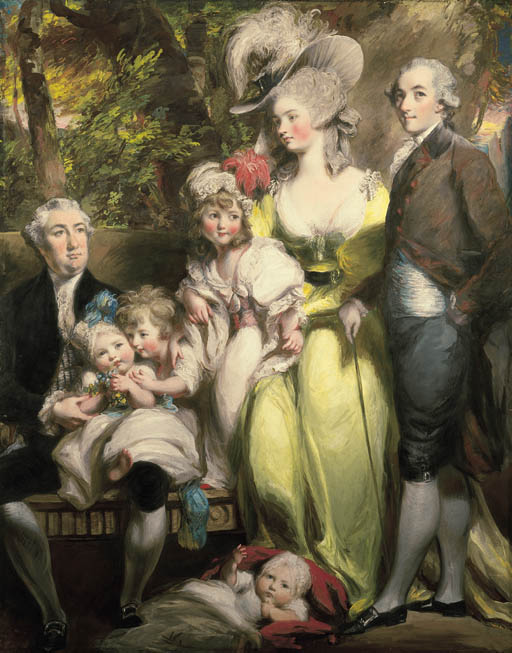
Although it is believed to be Simon Taylor (far left), he was in Jamaica at the time of the portrait, and did not meet his nieces and nephew (pictured) until after his brother's (far right) death.

Despite his wealth, Taylor never married, saying to his brother in 1772, “I am pretty confident I never shall marry.” Instead Taylor chose to co-habit with a number of "housekeepers", who were sometimes enslaved Black women, but were often free people of color. One of his mixed-race mistresses was Grace Donne, a "quadroon" who lived with him for more than thirty-years, and was the mother of at least one of his mixed-race children. Grace was also a "doctress", who used the hygiene and traditional herbal remedies employed by obeah women, to nurse Taylor back to health when he became ill with a fever. Grace was a contemporary of a successful group of Jamaican doctresses, such as Cubah Cornwallis, Sarah Adams, and Mrs Grant, the mother of Mary Seacole. Their traditions of using hygiene were arguably adopted by Florence Nightingale a century later, during the Crimean War.

Even though Taylor had several mixed-race children some of whom were born into and remained enslaved, Taylor never saw them as his heirs, because of the Black ancestry of their mother. In addition, Jamaican law at the time forbade planters from passing on significant amounts of property to their "mulatto" offspring. In 1804, Grace died, leaving Taylor distraught.

Instead, Simon Taylor always considered his younger brother John to be his heir, but while Simon was frugal, John was a spendthrift, and Simon often disapproved of his younger brother's extravagant lifestyle. Simon persuaded John to return to Jamaica to take control of the estates he had inherited in Hanover Parish, but within a year of arriving, John died in 1786. Simon was then saddled with the additional problems of clearing the debts incurred by John's Hanover estates.

The elder Simon would in later years complain about the extravagance of his nephew and namesake in Britain, but he was reluctant to encourage him to return to Jamaica, after the death of John.

Maria, Lady Nugent, the governor's wife, wrote that Taylor had mulatto mixed-race children with slave women on every one of his estates.

=== Death and legacy ===
Taylor made a trip to Port Royal, dogged by serious illness, by then determined to return to Britain to die there surrounded by his nephew and nieces. However, he died there on 14 April 1813, never making it back to England. His body was interred at his main residence in Kingston.

When Taylor died, there were over 2,000 people on his properties, and his personal estate was valued at more than £750,000. Some calculations put his wealth at over £1 million. He left the majority of his estate to his nephew, the baronet Sir Simon Taylor. However, he made some provisions for his mixed-race children.

Taylor left £500 to his free mulatto mistress Sarah Hunter, and £1,000 for their reputed daughter, the "quadroon" Sarah Taylor. In addition, Sarah Taylor's daughter, Sarah Cathcart, was allowed to inherit £2,000 when she turned 21, making these three mixed-race women wealthier than many white subjects in Jamaica at that time. He also left £500 to Grace Harris, the mixed-race niece of Grace Donne. When Hunter died in 1834, she left behind a personal estate of over £1,500, including two horses and 14 slaves.}

== Sources ==
- Petley, Christer (2018). White Fury: A Jamaican Slaveholder and the Age of Revolution. Oxford University Press. ISBN 978-0-19-879163-8.
- de Jong, Karst (2017). "The Irish in Jamaica during the long eighteenth century (1698–1836)" (PDF). Queen's University Belfast.
- "Simon Taylor of Jamaica". Centre for the Study of the Legacies of British Slavery / University College London.
- "Vale Royal". opm.gov.jm. Office of the Prime Minister of Jamaica. "Vale Royal, formerly known as "Prospect Pen" is located on Montrose Road in Kingston. One of the richest planters in Jamaica, Sir Simon Taylor, constructed the home in 1694. It then bought by the Government of Jamaica in 1928, and became the official residence of the British Colonial Secretary (Sir Reginald Edward Stubbs)."
- Gardner, W.J. (1971). A History of Jamaica: From Its Discovery by Christopher Columbus to the Year 1872 (PDF). Frank Cass & Co. ISBN 978-0-41576-099-7.
- Livesay, Daniel (2008). Extended Families: Mixed-Race Children and Scottish Experience, 1770–1820 (PDF) (Thesis). International Journal of Scottish Literature.
- Manktelow, Emily; Jackson, Will (2015). Subverting Empire: Deviance and Disorder in the British Colonial World. Palgrave Macmillan UK. ISBN 978-1-137-46586-3.
