= Mary Morris Knibb =

Jamaican educator (1886 – 1964)

- Knibb as portrayed on a Jamaican stamp issued in 2004
- Born: Mary Lenora Morris; 28 February 1886; Carmel, Westmoreland Parish, Colony of Jamaica, British Empire
- Died: 21 September 1964 (aged 78); Woodford Park, Saint Andrew Parish, Jamaica
- Other names: Nora Morris, Mary Knibb
- Occupations: teacher, social reformer, philanthropist
- Years active: 1907–1960
- Known for: first elected woman to the city council in Jamaica.

Mary Morris Knibb, MBE (28 February 1886 – 21 September 1964) was a Jamaican teacher, social reformer and philanthropist. She founded the Morris Knibb Preparatory School and donated a building which is used as the headquarters of the Moravian Church in Jamaica as well as land for construction of a community center. Morris Knibb was a women's rights activist and the first elected councilwomen in Jamaica. She was the first woman to vie for a seat in the House when Universal Suffrage was granted to all Jamaicans.

== Early life ==
Mary Lenora Morris "Nora" was born on 28 February 1886 in Carmel, Westmoreland Parish, Jamaica. In 1893, Morris began teaching as an assistant teacher at the Moravian Day School, in the customary pupil-teacher system of recruitment. Throughout the Caribbean prior to the 1950s, the most promising primary students, began working as assistant teachers to offset the cost of their further education. In some cases, they became full teachers upon passing an examination and in others were sent after their pupil-teacher contractual period to normal schools for additional training. Morris, followed the latter path and attended the Shortwood Teachers' College. While attending the college, Morris became one of the founders of the Alumni Students' Association.

== Career ==
Between 1907 and 1917, Morris taught at the St. George Girls' School and then taught for almost two years at the Central Branch School. She then became the headmistress of the Wesley School, where she remained until 1928. In 1931, the now married Morris, opened her own school, the Mary Morris-Knibb Preparatory School in Kingston, at 3 Hector Street, Saint Andrew Parish, which she had inherited a few months previously upon the death of Frances Morris. Catering to the middle-class, Morris-Knibb was known to provide an excellent education and stern discipline. Students were required to study geography, history, Latin, math, reading, spelling, and writing, earning the school the reputation as "one of the leading preparatory schools in the nation".

In 1936 or 1937, she co-founded, along with Amy Bailey, Eulalie Domingo and Edith Dalton James, the Jamaica Women's Liberal Club (LC). The organization was mostly made up of teachers and their goal was to agitate for women's inclusion in government service, including such posts as serving on the school board and civil service. Most of the women were black and middle-class women who wanted to advance the position of women in society on both socio-economic and political levels. One of the social protections for which Morris Knibb advocated was marriage. In part because of morality concerns, but in part because common-law arrangements did not protect children adequately, she favored even holding mass weddings so that the costs of the ceremony would be reduced and participation greater. When black women, like Morris-Knibb wanted to participate in the Child Welfare Association of Jamaica, they were told they were not welcome. The upperclass women of the Child Welfare Association suggested that the black women set up an auxiliary for women of their "shade". In response, Morris-Knibb joined Amy Bailey, May Farquharson, Dr. Jai Lal Varma, and Dr. Pengelley and others in founding the Save the Children Fund in 1938.

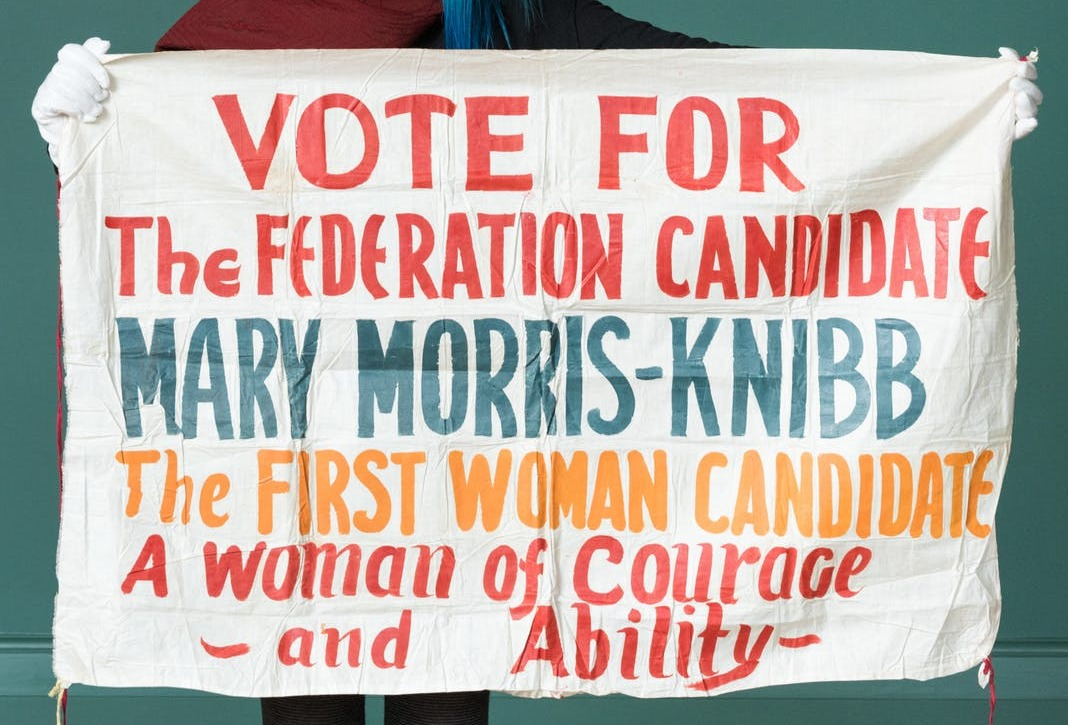
"Vote for Mary Morris Knibb" from her 1939 campaign (now in the Wellcome collection)

Morris Knibb was one of the leaders in the fight for Jamaican suffrage and as it had been a long-practiced method for women to gain a foothold and show their readiness to vote, she was in favor of women running for local offices. In 1939, the LC organized women and ran a campaign with Morris Knibb as their candidate for parish council. She won the seat for the Kingston/Saint Andrew Parish seat on the council, becoming the first woman to serve as an elected official in Jamaica. Her campaign had been supported by veteran suffragette Edith How-Martyn. Her work on the council focused on education and social services. She advocated for creation of after school programs, night schools, and trade education, utilizing existing school and government buildings for the purpose. She donated property located at 15 Byrnes Street to the Lower St. Andrews Citizen's Association to facilitate creation of a community centre and was active in programs to care for the poor and the aged.

When universal franchise was granted to Jamaicans in 1944, Morris Knibb immediately opened a campaign to run for a seat in the House, becoming the first woman to contest a general election in Jamaica. Though she didn't win, she was undaunted, becoming one of the first women sworn in as Justice of the Peace in 1945 and continuing to serve as a councilwoman through the early 1950s. In 1953, she was honored with the Order of the British Empire for her years of social service. Throughout the 1950s, she continued her work with the Moravian Church and served several terms as the vice-chair of the school board.

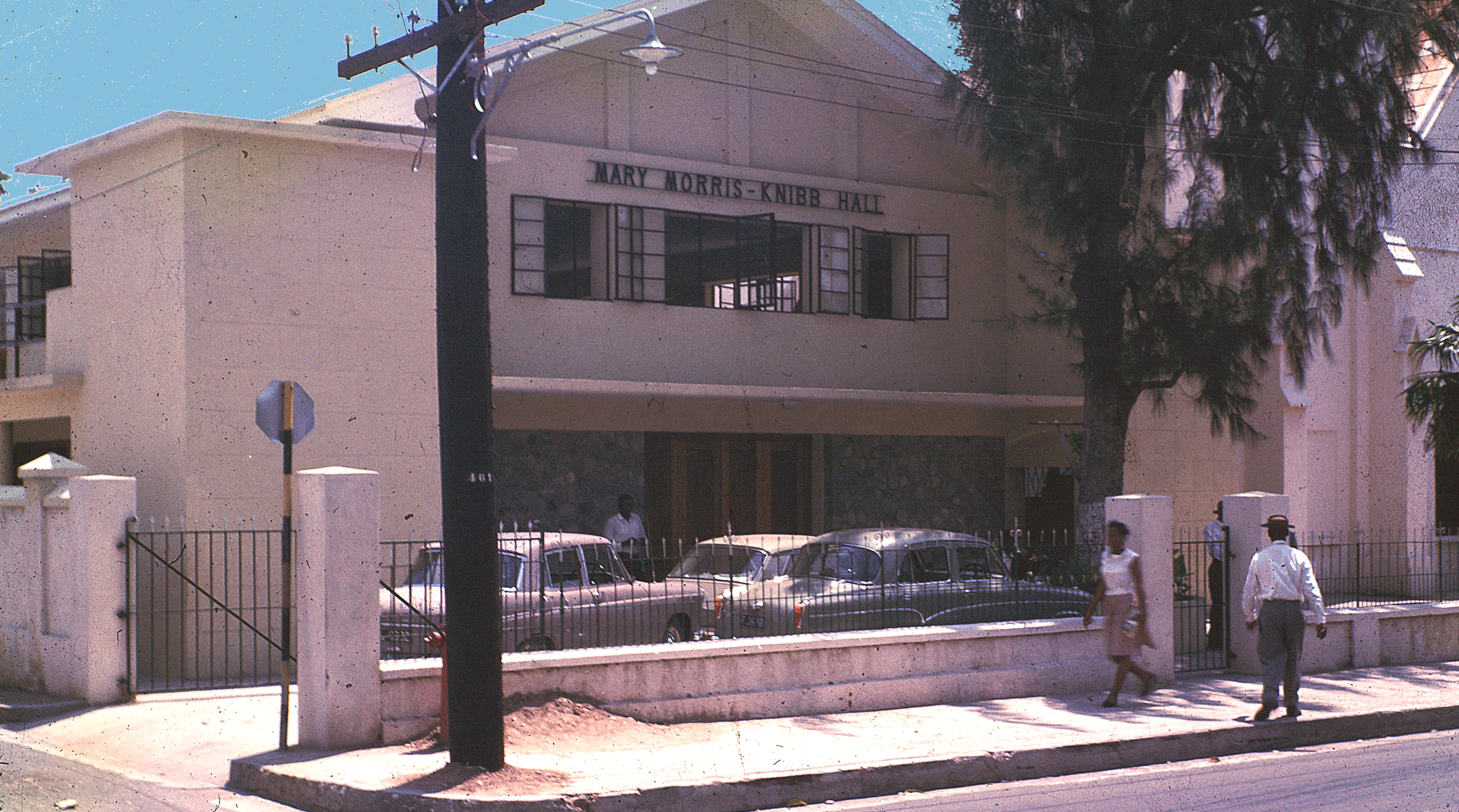
Mary Morris-Knibb Hall 1963

== Death and legacy ==
Morris Knibb died on 21 September 1964 in Woodford Park, Saint Andrew Parish, Jamaica. She donated the building which is used as the headquarters of the Moravian Church, 3 Hector Street, Kingston, Jamaica, to the organization. Generations of students have been educated at the Morris Knibb Preparatory School, including many prominent Jamaicans. In 1984, the school was relocated, from its original location next to the Moravian Church, to 1 Miraflores Drive on Molynes Road in St. Andrew Parish, teaching kindergarten to grade 6. In 2004, as part of the Moravian Church's 250th anniversary, the church worked to have the Postal Corporation of Jamaica issue commemorative stamps of important leaders in their organization. Morris Knibb was one of three honorees recognized in the commemorative stamp series.
