= May Farquharson =

Jamaican social worker (1894 – 1992)

The Honourable May Farquharson
- Born: Gladys May Farquharson; 26 March 1894; Half Way Tree, Saint Andrew Parish, Colony of Jamaica, British Empire
- Died: 29 June 1992 (aged 98); Cross Roads Saint Andrew Parish, Jamaica
- Occupation: social worker
- Years active: 1930–1980
- Known for: developing Jamaica's old age pension program

May Farquharson OJ (26 March 1894 – 29 June 1992) was a Jamaican social worker, birth control advocate, philanthropist and reformer. She was a founder of the Jamaican Family Planning League and Mother's Welfare Clinic, as well as the driving force behind the Old Age Pension program.

== Early life ==
Gladys May Farquharson was born on 26 March 1894 in Half Way Tree, Saint Andrew Parish, Jamaica to Lilian May (née Stone) and Arthur Wildman Farquharson. The Farquharsons' forebears had immigrated to Jamaica in the latter part of the 18th century. Her father was the Crown Solicitor for Jamaica from 1894 to 1911, before going into private practice. Farquharson attended various schools, in Jamaica, the United States, Jersey, and Cheltenham Ladies College prior to studying social work at the London School of Economics between 1928 and 1930.

== Career ==
During World War I, Farquharson worked as a volunteer aid to the nursing staff of the Royal Herbert Military Hospital in Woolwich. While she was in London, Farquharson also became involved in the settlement house movement, working in poorer neighborhoods in East London. In the early 1930s after completing her education, Farquharson returned to Jamaica and worked as an assistant to her father in his law practice. In addition to helping him, she became a Justice of the Peace and worked in the Juvenile Court for many years. Farquharson and Amy Bailey joined forces in 1937 and began working on strategies to improve the lives of women. One of the issues they discussed was family planning and another, was an initiative called Save the Children Fund, which they founded in 1938. Others who worked with them were Mary Morris Knibb, Dr. Jai Lal Varma, and Dr. Pengelley. With seed money given by May's father Arthur Farquharson, Bailey traveled to London with Una Marson to raise funds for providing food, clothing and textbooks to Jamaican school children. The fund drive was a resounding success and the organization is still thriving.

In 1939, Farquharson helped found the Birth Control League of Jamaica, which would later become the Family Planning League of Jamaica (FPLJ). At the same time, she founded in Kingston the Mother's Welfare Clinic. The goal of these organizations was to promote birth control among the populace as a means to improve their social condition, provide care and education about health needs to mothers and children, and to enlist government backing of the program. To that end, Farquharson kept a wide correspondence with other reformers, such as Vera Houghton, Edith How-Martyn, and Margaret Sanger, as well as birth control suppliers, such as Holland–Rantos. Reformers, such as Farquharson, saw their clients in Jamaica as a special population, which needed unique contraception methods and education techniques. Much of this attitude came out of the Eugenics movement of the 1930s, which saw the Afro-Jamaican poor as a culturally different and backward segment of society. Though in some ways, the efforts of the FPLJ were opposed by the Catholic Church of Jamaica, clergy and birth control advocates were in agreement that illegitimacy and co-habitation without marriage were social ills. Farquharson and the FPLJ, believed that limiting birth rates would not only reduce immorality, but also would diminish demand on the over-burdened and under-funded health services.

Organizations such as the Universal Negro Improvement Association and the leadership of the Jamaica Labour Party, joined the Catholic Church in opposing birth control, seeing it as an attempt to limit negro population growth. But, Farquharson's friend and fellow activist, Bailey, daughter of a notable family of black educators, was outspoken in support of the FPLJ, seeing birth control as a means of economic survival. Both Bailey and Farquharson addressed issues of discrimination based on skin shade, recognizing that women with darker skin, no matter their racial profile, often faced greater difficulties and limitations to their ability to access services and employment. Farquharson was one of the leaders who pushed for the FPLJ to join the International Planned Parenthood Federation, serving as honorary General Secretary at the 1958 conference held by Planned Parenthood in Kingston. After eighteen years, the FPLJ was successful in gaining government support of its family planning initiatives.

In the 1940s, Farquharson campaigned for women's suffrage, and after the death of her father in 1947 took over his advocacy projects for agricultural cooperatives, such as the Banana Producers’ Association, the Citrus Growers’ Association, the Coconut Producers’ Association and the Sugar Manufacturers’ Association. She also took over his responsibilities at the Farquharson Institute of Public Affairs. Of particular interest to Farquharson were unemployment, education and pension provisions and she served on various governmental committees that attempted to address these issues in Jamaica.

In 1956, Farquharson donated a furnished house in Kingston, with capacity for fourteen people, and an endowment to the Anglican Diocese of Jamaica and the Cayman Islands as a home for clergy, aged parishioners, or convalescing patients of limited means from the Nuttall Memorial Hospital. The facility was still operational in 2013, requiring residents to pay a nominal rental which includes housekeeping and meals. In 1962, Farquharson was involved in the creation of a pension program for older Jamaicans, for which she had been advocating since 1937. Farquharson wrote articles in many newspapers under the pen-name of "Fedalia" urging the government to adopt a European-style "Old-Age Pension Scheme".

Farquharson remained active into her 80s, continuing to work on social issues for vulnerable populations, specifically the young and aged.

== Death and legacy ==
On International Women's Day 8 March 1990, Bailey and Farquharson, were awarded the Order of Jamaica for their contributions to women's rights. A ceremony bestowing the order was held on 5 June 1990. That same year, a documentary on the lives of Bailey and Farquharson, their remarkable friendship, and their work for women's political and economic equality was produced by Sistren Research.

Farquharson died on 29 June 1992 in Cross Roads, Saint Andrew, Jamaica. Shortly after her death, the Farquharson Institute of Public Affairs created a garden to her memory and led a campaign to provide books to Jamaican libraries in Farquharson's name. She was honored posthumously in a celebration of International Women's Day in 2002.
