= Amy Bailey (educator) =

Jamaican educator (1895–1990)

The Honourable Amy Bailey
- Born: Amy Beckford Bailey; 27 November 1895; Walderston, Manchester Parish, Colony of Jamaica, British Empire
- Died: 3 October 1990 (aged 94); Kingston, Jamaica
- Occupations: teacher, social worker, women's rights and civil rights activist
- Years active: 1919–1978
- Known for: opening civil service jobs to technical school graduates and gaining women the right to serve on the Legislative Council

Amy Beckford Bailey, OJ, OD, MBE (27 November 1895 – 3 October 1990) was a Jamaican educator, social worker and women's rights advocate. She was a co-founder of the Jamaican aid organization Save the Children and was the driving force behind the drive for introducing birth control to the island. She received many honours and awards in her career, including the Order of the British Empire, the Jamaican Order of Distinction and the Marcus Garvey Award for Excellence in 1988. In 1990, shortly before her death, she was honoured with the Order of Jamaica.

== Early life ==
Bailey was born on 27 November 1895 in Walderston, Manchester Parish, Jamaica, to Anne (née Lawson) and William Frederick Bailey. Bailey was the fifth of eight children born to her parents who were both teachers. Her father was the founder of the Jamaica Union of Teachers and encouraged all of his children to become teachers, as there were few other opportunities open to black Jamaicans. After attending elementary school at Mount Olivet Primary School, Bailey studied at Shortwood Teacher's College, graduating in 1917. Soon thereafter, she was stricken with severe dysmenorrhea. While recuperating, she studied on her own to earn accounting, bookkeeping, and shorthand.

== Career ==
In January 1920, Bailey began teaching at the Kingston Technical High School (KTHS), when she was hired to replace her sister who was taking a three-month leave of absence. Ivy didn't return to the school, and Bailey, who began as a shorthand instructor, remained until 1958. After she retired from KTHS, Bailey taught at the College of Arts Science and Technology between 1958 and 1963.

== Public social work ==
In 1936, Bailey and her sister Ina founded the Women’s Liberal Club (WLC), with the goal of helping women improve their employment opportunities, as rarely were women promoted for their qualifications, but instead by having to curry favour from prominent men. They believed that by improving the socio-economic status of women, they would improve their cultural and national pride. In 1939 WLC organized a conference to allow women to discuss the problems they faced. Issues they highlighted were that women were barred from participation in the Legislative Council; could not be appointed as officials, such as inspectors, jurors, justices of the peace, or police officers; were barred from upper positions in civil service jobs; and that racial discrimination impacted their employment opportunity. Bailey formalized these issues into recommendations, which were submitted to the governor in 1941 and led to a law prohibiting sex discrimination. The law allowed women to hold public office and eliminated employment bans for women.

Concerned with the discrimination she saw in the class hierarchy enshrined in Jamaica at the time, Bailey wrote a series of editorials that were published in The Gleaner. She openly addressed the racial discrimination that relegated black-skinned Jamaicans to menial jobs and poverty, brown-skinned Jamaicans to middle-class blue-collar jobs and white Jamaicans to positions of authority. In one article written in 1937, entitled "Not Wanted—I", she discussed how it was especially difficult for women to attain positions in line with their skills and training. A few months later, she published "Discrimination", in which she urged women to boycott institutions and establishments that did not treat them fairly. These articles drew criticism from some factions of society, which claimed Bailey was trying to start a race war. Bailey countered that she was simply trying to bring the issue into the open and prompt laws to address disparity. Though the WLC conference had proposed a law end to racial discrimination be passed, that was one of the recommendations upon which the government refused to act.

Bailey and May Farquharson joined forces in 1937 and began working on other strategies to improve the lives of women. One of the issues they discussed was family planning, and another was an initiative called Save the Children Fund, which they founded in 1938. Joining forces with them were Mary Morris Knibb, Dr. Jai Lal Varma, and Dr. Pengelley. With seed money given by May’s father Arthur Farquharson, Bailey travelled to London with Una Marson to raise funds for providing food, clothing and textbooks to Jamaican school children. The fund drive was a resounding success and the organization is still thriving. While in England, Bailey became the first Jamaican to testify to the Royal Commission headed by Walter Guinness, 1st Baron Moyne about labour unrest, the burgeoning trade union movement, as well as the political unrest plaguing Jamaica at that time. She also met with proponents of family planning, and when she returned to Jamaica a birth control drive was launched in 1939 with a seminar held at the Ward Theater.

Leading up to the meeting, Dr. Varma, an Indian-born doctor who was residing in Jamaica, and several other prominent figures published their views on the matter in The Gleaner. Varma and Dr. William Edward Mcculloch were the only physicians willing to publish their views in favour of controlling the birth rate. Their view was that the extremely high birth rate in Jamaica was a hindrance to economic progress. The doctor's views were refuted by the churches, which though concerned about illegitimacy, felt that birth control was a family matter. Bailey, saw the issue as one that addressed gender and racial inequalities. She organized, with the help of Farquharson and Judith Decordova, a charity worker, a three-month lecture tour throughout Jamaica by Edith How-Martyn, a British feminist and birth control advocate. They established their first clinic in 1939 at 24 East Race Course, and provided nursery care and parenting classes. The women successfully continued the programme, despite the various organizations that disapproved, until the government finally took over Family Planning.

Another initiative launched in 1938 occurred when Bailey met with Governor Edward Brandis Denham to express her concern about the limited opportunities available to black youths. She expressed the frustration of her students who had graduated with technical skills but were barred from working in civil service jobs. Believing that her outspokenness would result in reprimand, she was surprised when a committee was set up within two weeks of the governor's visit with her to investigate the situation. Meeting between 1938 and 1939, the committee recommended that civil service exams be opened to all graduates of the Technical High School. Beginning in 1939, banking and business employment became open to the students.

In 1944, the adviser to the Comptroller for Colonial Development and Welfare for the West Indies publicly criticized Jamaican women for their lack of contribution to their nation. Bailey took the words as a call to action and founded the Homecraft Training Centre as a way to build their dignity and self-respect while teaching them skills. In 1946 with her own funds, she made a down-payment on the property at 4 Rosedale Avenue in Kingston and began offering home economics courses. The centre offered training in catering, cooking, domestic skills, and sewing, as well as English language and arithmetic to girls. She headed the centre until 1978, when she retired.

Bailey died on 3 October 1990 at Nuttall Memorial Hospital in Kingston, Jamaica.

== Legacy ==
Throughout her lifetime, Bailey received many awards and honours. In 1978, she was awarded the Jamaican Order of Distinction for her public service. In January 1988, she was awarded the Marcus Garvey Award for Excellence for her dedication to the development of social programs of Jamaica. In 1990, a documentary on the lives of Bailey and Farquharson, their remarkable friendship, and their work for women's political and economic equality was produced by Sistren Research. On International Women's Day, 8 March 1990, Bailey and Farquharson, were awarded the Order of Jamaica for their contributions to women's rights. A ceremony bestowing the order was held on 5 June 1990.
