= Half Way Tree =

Half Way Tree Halfatri
- Neighbourhood
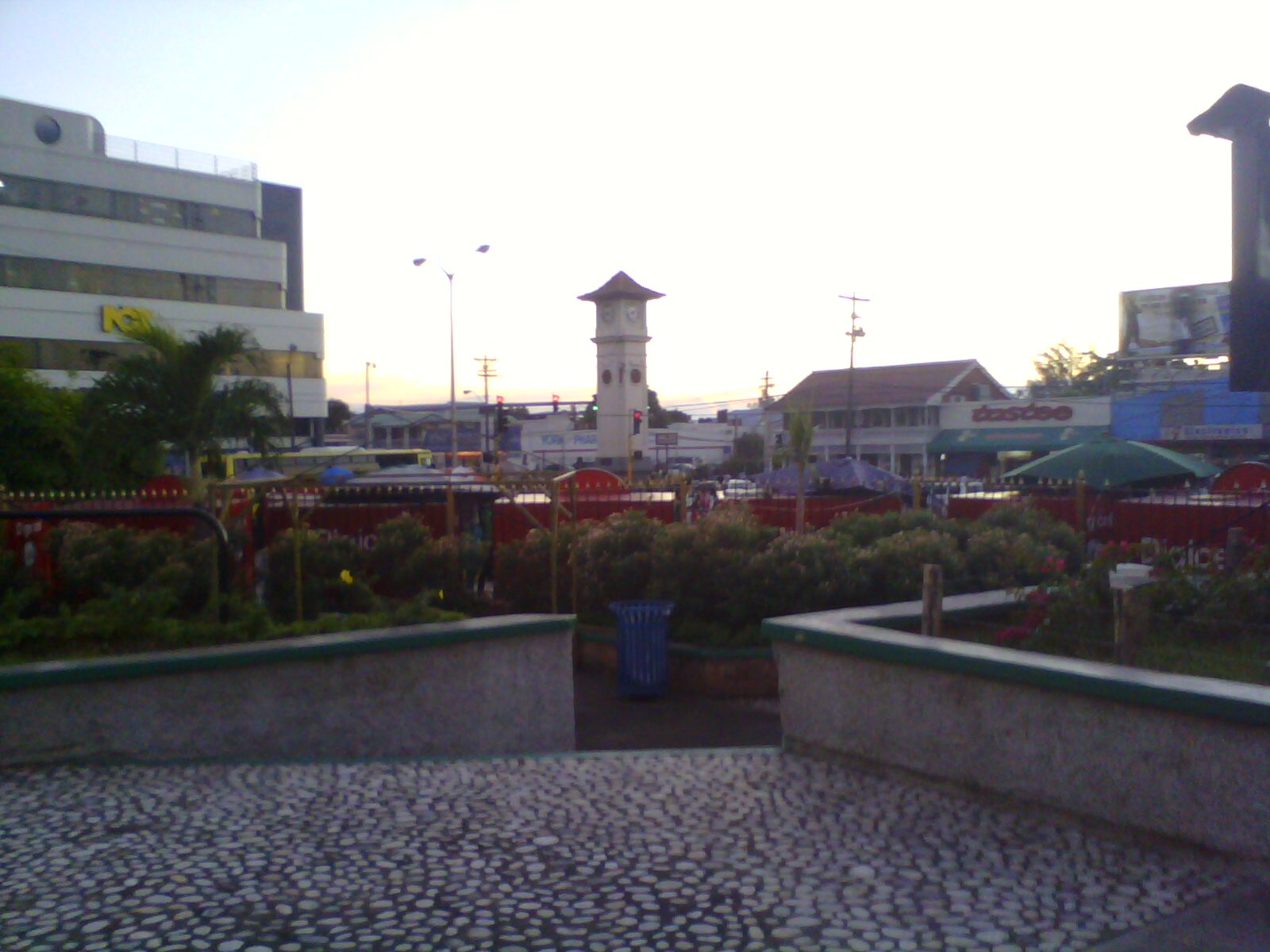
- Half Way Tree Clock Tower from the northeast

- Location within Jamaica
- Coordinates: 18°0′38″N 76°47′5″W
- Country: Jamaica
- Parish: St Andrew

Half Way Tree (Jamaican Patois: Halfatri) is a neighbourhood in the city of Kingston, Jamaica. It is the parish capital of St. Andrew.

Half Way Tree is served by the Kingston 10 post office.

In recent years, as a result of crime and violence in Downtown Kingston and Cross Roads, Half Way Tree has overtaken these areas as the central hub of the capital, Kingston and, perhaps, the busiest thoroughfare in the city. The area has become a popular location to do business in Kingston because of its central location and proximity to Downtown Kingston, the New Kingston Business District as well as it being the transportation hub of Kingston. The National Works Agency, for example, estimates that approximately 250,000 commute through the Half Way Tree area daily from Monday through Saturday. In recent years, the area has become increasingly attractive as a residential neighbourhood to young professionals, again because of its proximity to where many of them work. The apartments and townhouses are located mainly on Surbiton Road, Winchester Road, Ruthven Road and Cecelio Avenue. As a result, Half Way Tree has become one of the most expensive areas in Kingston to purchase real estate: an acre of land can run as high as US$1.5 million.

A number of prominent schools, including St Andrew High School for Girls and Holy Childhood High School, are located in the heart of Half Way Tree.

A busy shopping district, Half Way Tree is also home to many plazas and malls—such as Twin Gates, Mall Plaza, Tropical Plaza, Kings Plaza, Lane Plaza, the Pavilion Mall, which is considered as famous and well-known in Kingston and Jamaica as a whole. There are also a number of prominent churches in the area such as Holy Cross Church and Webster Memorial.

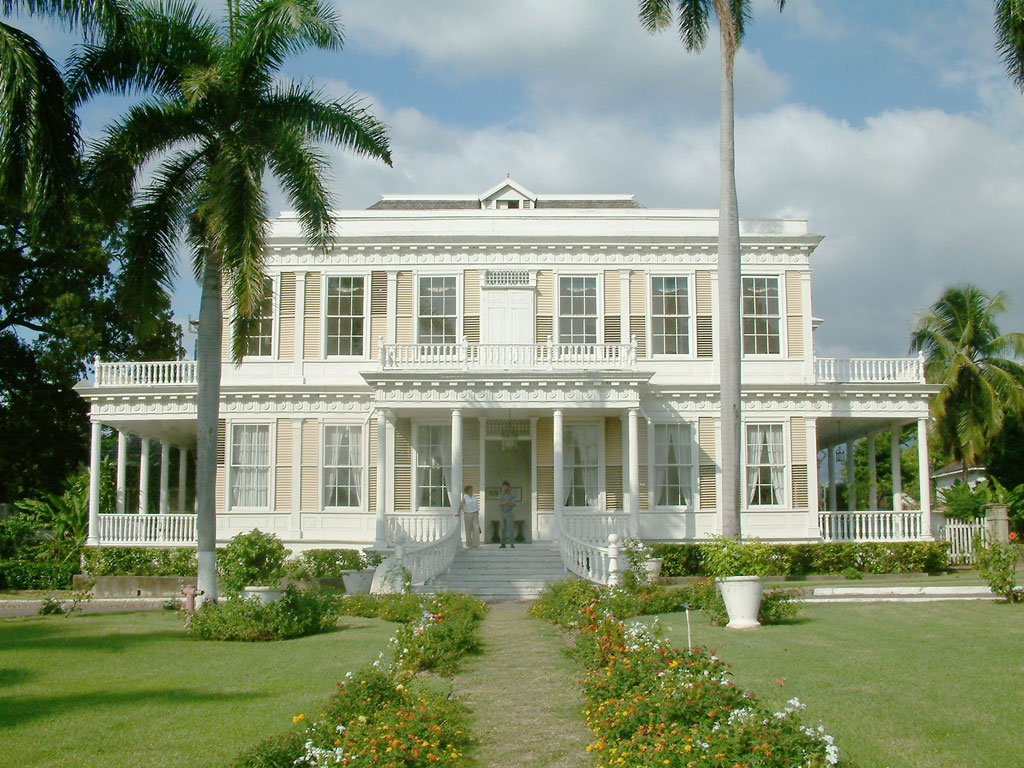
Devon House, home of the first West Indian millionaire of African descent.

While the business and commercial areas are in the heart of Half Way Tree, the residential areas tend to be concentrated on the outer verges.

Within a mile of the clock tower marking the position of the old Half Way Tree is Devon House, a National Heritage Site.

== Notable people ==
- May Farquharson, social worker, birth-control advocate, philanthropist, and reformer
- Hugh Verity, Royal Air Force pilot who flew secret agents in and out of France during World War II, was born here
- Pamela Ball, British surgeon, the first Jamaican woman to be named a fellow of the Royal College of Surgeons Royal College of Surgeons of England of England. Ball also received first-class honours and a master's degree in mathematics from the Open University Open University which she considered her greatest achievement, because she had done this in parallel with her other work
