= Edith Dalton-James =

Jamaican educator and politician

Edith Dalton-James MBE, CD

Member of the Legislative Council
- In office 1944–1949
- Monarch: George VI
- Prime Minister: Alexander Bustamante
- Governor: Sir John Huggins

Personal details
- Born: Edith Dalton Walcott; February 1, 1896 Westmoreland
- Died: November 5, 1976 (aged 80)
- Party: People's National Party
- Spouse: Spencer Wesley James (m. 1919)
- Children: 3
- Awards: Order of the British Empire, Order of Distinction

Edith Dalton-James MBE CD (February 1, 1896 – November 5, 1976) was a Jamaican educator and politician. She was a founding member of the People's National Party (1938), and the first woman to become president of the Jamaica Union of Teachers in 1949.

== Early life and education ==
Dalton-James was born on February 1, 1896, in Townhead, Westmoreland. She was the daughter of John William Walcott and Jeanette Walcott (née Young). She attended Shortwood Teachers College from 1911 to 1914. She also attended the Institute of Education, University of London.

== Education career ==
Dalton-James worked as a teacher at Unity and Half Way Tree schools, prior to serving as principal of Chetolah Park Primary School beginning in 1951. She was a schoolteacher for forty years, twenty of which she spent at Chetolah Park. She served four terms as president of the Jamaican Union of Teachers (JUT), and was elected three times as president of the Caribbean Union of Teachers. Dalton-James was instrumental in the development of the Jamaica Teachers' Association. She was the first woman and first classroom teacher to become president of the JUT in 1949.

== Political career ==
In 1938, Osmond Theodore Fairclough, Norman Manley, Dalton-James, and others, founded the People's National Party (PNP). She was subsequently made a life member of the PNP in 1962. Dalton-James first entered representational politics immediately after the granting of universal adult suffrage in 1944. She ran two times unsuccessfully as a candidate for the House of Representatives from the constituency of Saint Andrew Western (1944 and 1949). She was appointed to the Legislative Council of Jamaica (Senate) in 1944 and served until 1949.

== Honors and awards ==
In 1953, Dalton-James was awarded the Queen's Coronation Medal, and in 1958, she received the Order of the British Empire (MBE). In 1971, the University of the West Indies conferred on her the honorary Doctor of Laws, and in 1975, the Jamaican government awarded her the Order of Distinction (Commander Class). In 1977, a community complex on Slipe Pen Road, Kingston, was named in her honour. The Edith Dalton-James High School in St Andrew was also named in her honour.

== Personal life and death ==
In 1919, Dalton-James married Spencer Wesley James, a teacher. The marriage produced a son (Seymour W. James, Sr.) and two daughters (Marebelle James Mowatt and Joyce James). Dalton-James died on November 5, 1976, at the age of 80.
