= Ann-Marie Campbell =

Executive for The Home Depot

- Born: 1965 (age 59–60); Kingston, Jamaica
- Education: Georgia State University (BA, MBA)
- Years active: 1985–present
- Employer: The Home Depot

Ann-Marie Campbell (born 1965) is a Jamaican-American business executive. Since January 2016, she has been the executive vice president of U.S. stores for The Home Depot. She began working at Home Depot in 1985 as a part-time cashier during college and rose to her current position. She has received numerous honors, including being named to Fortune's 2014, 2016, 2018 and 2020 list of 50 Most Powerful Women in Business.

== Early life and education ==
Born in Kingston, Jamaica, she is the youngest of four children and the only girl. Her father died in a car accident at age 26, when Ann-Marie was one and a half. Her grandmother, herself a divorced mother of 10, helped her mother raise her. Her grandmother owned a furniture and appliance store, where Ann-Marie worked during the summer and school breaks. During the school year, she boarded at Holy Childhood High School, a Catholic school for girls.

After graduating high school in 1981, she and her mother and brothers immigrated to the United States, settling in Miami. She earned an M.B.A. at the J. Mack Robinson College of Business at Georgia State University (GSU) in 2005, after completing a bachelor's degree in philosophy.

== Career ==
On April 1, 1985, Campbell took a part-time job as a cashier at a Home Depot branch in North Miami Beach, Florida to help pay her way through college. One day in 1989, vice president Lynn Martineau came to the branch for a "store walk" with the employees, and when he asked a question, Campbell volunteered the answer. Impressed by her assertiveness, Martin became her mentor, encouraging her to pursue promotions in other store operations such as merchandising, sales, and marketing.

Campbell's advancement in the company included positions as department manager, store manager, district manager, regional vice president, vice president of operations, vice president of merchandising and special orders, vice president of retail marketing and sales, and vice president of vendor services before being named president of the southern division in 2009. In the latter position, she was in charge of 690 stores and 100,000 employees in 15 states, Puerto Rico, and St. Thomas. In January 2016 she was promoted to executive vice president of U.S. stores, with responsibility for 2,000 stores and most of the company's nearly 400,000 employees.

After Hurricane Andrew devastated southern Florida in 1992, destroying a Home Depot branch in south Miami, Campbell managed the store in the parking lot "with bricks, building materials, and mobile cash registers".

== Other activities ==
In 2014 she established the Ann-Marie Campbell Scholarship for undergraduates at the J. Mack Robinson College of Business at GSU.

In August 2014 she joined the Board of Directors of Potbelly Corporation, and in June 2015 she was appointed an Independent Director at Barnes & Noble. She serves on the advisory boards of the nonprofit Catalyst and J. Mack Robinson College of Business at GSU. She will be a board member of the Metropolitan Atlanta chapter of the American Red Cross in the 2016 calendar year. She has been a member of the Board of Directors of Workday since April 2019.

== Honors ==
In 2010 Campbell was named one of the 75 Most Powerful Women in Business by Black Enterprise.

In 2012 she was named one of Atlanta's 100 Top Black Women of Influence by the Atlanta Business League.

In 2014 she was ranked #38 on Fortune's list of 50 Most Powerful Women in Business.

== Personal ==
In 1988 she married Christopher Campbell, a chef who is originally from Oracabessa, St Mary. They have two sons.
