= Jo Cato =

American businesswoman (born 1965)

- Born: Jo Amaka Cato; 25 February 1965 (age 61); Jamaica
- Education: University of Nevada, Las Vegas; George Washington University
- Occupations: Businesswoman, and Public servant
- Years active: 2004- present
- Title: Founder and CEO of the Periwinkle Group
- Political party: Democratic Party

Jo Amaka Cato (born February 25, 1965), is an American businesswoman and public servant based in Nevada. She is the founder and CEO of the Periwinkle Group, a marketing and public relations firm, and has held roles in Nevada business and civic organizations before running for the Nevada State Assembly in 2026.

== Background ==
Cato was born on 25 February 1965 in Jamaica and moved to the United States in 1994. She attended Holy Childhood High School in Kingston. Cato earned a bachelor's degree in economics from the University of Nevada, Las Vegas and a master's degree in economics from George Washington University.

== Career ==
In 2004, Cato founded the Periwinkle Group, a Las Vegas marketing, public relations and communications firm with offices in Las Vegas, Massachusetts, Nigeria, and Ghana. In 2024, Periwinkle Group received the U.S. Small Business Administration's Woman-Owned Business of the Year award for Nevada.

== Public service ==
Cato served as a Planning Commissioner for the City of North Las Vegas from 1999 to 2011, holding both the chairman and vice chairman roles. She later served on the Governor's Workforce Development Board under Governor Brian Sandoval and on the Nevada State Apprenticeship Council. She has been active in the African Chamber of Commerce and Tourism and the Southern Nevada chapter of the National Association of Women Business Owners. She became president of the Southern Nevada chapter of NAWBO in 2026. In 2018, Cato appeared before the Nevada Legislature's Senate Committee on Government Affairs as a representative of the African Chamber of Commerce.

== Political career ==
In 2026, Cato ran as a Democrat for the open Nevada State Assembly seat representing District 1, following incumbent Daniele Monroe-Moreno's decision not to seek reelection. Her campaign focused on small-business development, workforce development, housing affordability, education, and support for veterans. Cato placed second behind Alexis Esparza.

== Recognition ==
- 2018: Entrepreneur of the Year award from the National Association of Women Business Owners.
- 2024: Named Among the Top 10 Women of Excellence by Womenpreneur Magazine US Edition.
- 2024: The U.S. Small Business Administration Woman-Owned Business of the Year award for Nevada.
- 2025: The Forbes 50 Over 50 list.
