= Carib Theatre =

Cinema in Kingston, Jamaica

- Grand Old Lady of Cross Roads
- Interactive map of Carib Theatre
- Location: Cross Roads, Kingston, Jamaica
- Coordinates: 17°59′33″N 76°47′19″W
- Owner: The Cinema Company of Jamaica Ltd. (1938); Palace Amusement Company (ca. 1939–present)
- Capacity: 1,800 (1972)
- Type: Movie theatre
- Screen: 5
- Field size: 180 ft (55 m) × 84 ft (26 m); Ceiling: 60 ft (18 m); Volume: Under 1,000,000 ft^{3} (28,000 m^{3})

Construction
- Built: Late 1937–early 1938
- Opened: 13 April 1938
- Closed: After 21 September 1996
- Reopened: 24 June 1997
- Architect: John Pike

Website
- palaceamusement.com

The Carib Theatre, also known as the Carib 5, is a cinema in northern Kingston, Jamaica. Opened in 1938, it has been owned and operated by the Palace Amusement Company since ca. 1939. The Carib was the largest and highest-grossing theatre in the West Indies, and was once Jamaica's largest building. It served as a one-screen facility until a 1996 fire and 1997 renovation/conversion into a five-screen multiplex.

== History ==
Development on the Carib Theatre began in August 1937, when Jamaican businessman B.M. Andrade made a deal with Metro-Goldwyn-Mayer (MGM) to build an upscale, state-of-the-art movie theatre in Kingston. Designed by Boston University graduate John Pike, the facility was constructed as a rival to Kingston's older Palace Theatre, operated by Audley Morais, and would secure exclusive deals with MGM and 20th-Century Fox. "As the manager of the Carib [Morris Cargill] explained later, 'MGM realised that if their films were even to be shown in Jamaica either the price would have to be reduced or the theatre monopoly would have to be broken. The MGM people decided upon the latter course.'"

The Cinema Company of Jamaica Ltd. opened the Carib at 9:00 a.m. local time on 13 April 1938; the first film to be screened there was MGM's The Firefly at 10:00 a.m. The Jamaica Gleaner declared the opening "the film event of the decade... Rarely, if ever, have Kingston and St. Andrew film-fans seen such a day." The theatre, Jamaica's largest building upon its opening, became Morais' first rival in 25 years; as the MGM and Fox titles came to the island, manager Morris Cargill wrote that "this did not come about without generating large amounts of bad blood on all sides." "Faced with competition for his best customers—the middle and upper classes of Kingston," Morais bought the Carib through his Palace Amusement Company just before World War II.

Of its architecture, John F. Allen of High Performance Stereo (HPS) and the Carib's then-manager Douglas Graham respectively wrote in October 1982 (for BoxOffice magazine) and October 1990:

The seats were originally divided among the first floor, one balcony and a small mezzanine area along the right wall. This area was about 18 feet above the first floor and extended 55 feet from the balcony. The distance from the projection booth to the screen is 180 feet. The room is 84 feet wide and over 45 feet high. Its volume is nearly one half million cubic feet.

— Allen

The auditorium itself is 20 feet smaller than the outer shell, as there is a high 10 foot air cushion between the solid, reinforced poured concrete wall on the outside and the metal and wood frame inner wall.

The air conditioning return duct comprises the entire basement of the building, which varies from a height of 4 feet, in the vicinity of the stage, to 8 feet. in the back of the hall. It is such an enclosed and robust bunker that, with the outbreak of hostilities in 1939, the then Colonial Government commandeered it and sand-bagged it as a safe place from which the Government would operate, if Jamaica should ever experience an air raid.

— Graham

In the late 1940s, the Palace Amusement Co. was acquired by the J. Arthur Rank company; by 1954, the Carib's proscenium was removed to make way for a 58-foot screen accommodating CinemaScope films. In June 1972, the facility was host to the premiere of Perry Henzell's The Harder They Come, where its opening-night audience of 5,000 exceeded the seating capacity of 1,800. In addition to showing movies, the Carib also hosted various live musical and stage events over the years.

In 1982, John F. Allen of High Performance Stereo (HPS) installed the first computer-designed theatrical sound system at the Carib, profiled in two BoxOffice magazine articles (in October 1982 and February 1991). This system, the HPS-4000, also brought four-track Dolby Stereo sound to the theatre— "powered by 6000 watts of BGW amplifiers"— and also featured "a surround array of 24 speakers, enhanced delay mechanism, and Klipsch TMCM-3 stage speakers". The Klipsch equipment was upgraded in 1986, and Dolby SR was phased in by 1988.

With the acoustic output equal to 20 symphony orchestras all playing at once, [what] I designed and built for the Carib Theatre was by far the most powerful of its kind ever built.... To see and hear a film in this place was simply an incredible experience.

— John F. Allen, 1997

Starting in the early 1980s, the Carib competed with the Regal, another Kingston theatre situated several hundred yards away. As audiences increasingly turned to the Carib and its sound system, the Regal closed and became a shopping centre. Eventually, the Carib became the highest-grossing theatre in the West Indies, and remained its largest such facility.

External image
- Picture of the burnt interior of the Carib, 21 September 1996 (Jamaica Observer, 2021)

On 21 September 1996, the theatre was consumed by fire. "Starting in the auditorium's ceiling," recounted Allen, "the fire spread rapidly throughout the structure and turned the theatre into a smoldering ruin in just three hours." One firefighter, 26-year-old Lambert Blackwood, was Jamaica's first to be killed in a fire; another two were injured. Also injured was Douglas Graham, "one of the heirs to his father's [Palace] company". Graham spent one week in a local hospital after suffering from smoke inhalation while helping the firefighters.

In the months after the fire, the Carib was renovated and split into five auditoriums. Although the walls were retained, the original single-screen facility was deemed too expensive to be rebuilt. On 24 June 1997, it reopened as the Carib 5.

On 1 July 2009, Ice Age: Dawn of the Dinosaurs was the first film to be shown in 3D at the Carib.

== Amenities ==
The Carib was the British West Indies' first building to offer air conditioning upon its opening. During World War II, two parking lots stood next to the theatre—one for motor vehicles, and another for "animal powered traffic—bicycles and buggies."

As a single-screen outlet, it was noted for its acoustics:

From an acoustic standpoint, it is the best hall in Jamaica, maybe in the West Indies. You can converse in a normal voice from the stage to someone standing at the back of the balcony 180 feet away. No classic performer that used our stage has ever had to be amplified.

— Douglas Graham, 1990

== See also ==
- Cinema of Jamaica
