= Holy Childhood High =

Holy Childhood High School

Location
- 9 Skibo Avenue Kingston 10, Jamaica; Kingston, Jamaica; Jamaica; 18.00746°N 76.79820°W

Information
- Motto: "Post Proleium Praemium" "After the battle, the reward"
- Religious affiliation: Christian
- Denomination: Catholic
- Founded: 1937
- Founder: Franciscan Missionary Sisters
- Status: Open
- Head of school: Sis. Maxine Marie Mcintosh
- Grades: 7–13
- Gender: Female
- Enrollment: 1700+
- Language: English, Jamaican English
- Colours: Blue and Gold
- Song: "Let Us Now In Youth Rejoice"
- Yearbook: "The Shield"
- Alumni: Jacqueline Bishop, Marcia Douglas, Macka Diamond, Paula-Ann Porter, Tricia "ZJ Sparks" Spence

Holy Childhood High School is a Catholic school in Kingston, Jamaica. It is a well-ranked all-girls school for academics and sports. Pupils of the institution go on to careers in, among other areas, law, business, education, medicine and the arts.

The school was named after the Child Jesus, and was founded by the Franciscan Missionary Sisters of Our Lady of Perpetual Help of Jamaica (FMS) in Jamaica. Holy Childhood High began as a private school in 1937 with 8 pupils (3 boys 5 girls the boys were later transferred to St. George's College) housed in a building near Holy Cross Rectory. The school is located at 9 Skibo Avenue Kingston 10, Jamaica, West Indies. The school is operated by the Ministry of Education in Jamaica and receives financial assistance, which makes it a grant-in-aid school.

As of 2010, the student population stands at over 1700, exclusive of the Holy Childhood Institute, a private institution which caters for approximately 300 students. Both the high school and the Institute are accommodated on approximately 7 acres (28,000 m^{2}) of land which provide space for offices, a playing field, blocks of classrooms, science and language laboratories, a library, bookstore, areas for home economics, music, visual art studios, two tennis courts, a health clinic, gardens, and a large multipurpose hall - Stephanie Hall- named for a past headmistress Sr. Stephanie Grey, FMS, who served as headmistress from 1966-1996.

The school's emblem is a shield, embedded with the school’s motto, Post Proleium Pramieum which translates to "AFTER THE BATTLE THE REWARD". The school’s colours are blue and gold.

== Notable alumnae ==
- Jacqueline Bishop, award-winning author and visual artist
- Ann-Marie Campbell, executive vice-president for Home Depot
- Macka Diamond, Jamaican singer and writer
- Marcia Douglas, award-winning author and university professor
- Jo Cato, businesswoman and public servant
