= Jamaica Teachers' Association =

The Jamaica Teachers' Association (JTA) is a trade union representing education workers in Jamaica.

In 1961, the Jamaica Union of Teachers, the Association of Headmasters and Headmistresses, the Association of Teachers in Technical Institutions, the Association of Teacher Training Staffs, and the Association of Assistant Masters and Mistresses, formed the Joint Executive of Teachers' Associations, to co-ordinate their activity. This was a success, and in 1964, the unions merged fully, forming the JTA.

The JTA was more militant than any of the former unions, and in 1966 it organised the country's first national teachers' strike. This was successful in securing pay increases, and led to five further strikes over the next 20 years. In the 1980s, there was a split from the union, which formed the National Union of Democratic Teachers.

By the 1990s, the union had 18,000 members, which it claimed included 90% of the country's state schoolteachers. It ran a credit union, a housing co-operative, and a publishing house, in addition to establishing a code of ethics for teachers.

== Secretaries General ==
1974: Fay E. Saunders
1984: Woodburn Miller
1994: Eric Downie
2002: Adolph Cameron
2014: Patrick Smith
2015: Byron Farquharson
