= Carmel, Westmoreland, Jamaica =

Settlement in Westmoreland, Jamaica

Coordinates: 18.17326°N 77.93929°W

Location of Carmel in Jamaica

Carmel is a settlement in Jamaica, located in Westmoreland.
