= List of regions of Jamaica by Human Development Index =

This is a list of regions of Jamaica by Human Development Index as of 2025 with data for the year 2023.

Rank	Region (Parish)	HDI (2023)
High human development
1	Saint Ann, Saint Catherine	0.733
2	Kingston Parish, Saint Andrew	0.728
–	Jamaica (average)	0.720
3	Manchester, Clarendon	0.716
4	Saint James, Hanover, Westmoreland	0.712
5	Saint Thomas, Portland, Saint Mary	0.709
6	Trelawny, Saint Elizabeth	0.701
