= Jamaica Union of Teachers =

Trade Union

The Jamaica Union of Teachers (JUT) was a trade union representing schoolteachers in Jamaica.

The union was founded in 1894. It was the first trade union in Jamaica. Its initial organisation was based on the British National Union of Teachers. However, in its early years, the JUT functioned more as a professional association. Its first president was the principal of the Rico Teachers Training College, who was from England.

The union was later led by J. A. Mason and W. F. Bailey, two headteachers. They began campaigning to improve teachers' pay and working conditions, with considerable success. They also succeeded in getting the British Parliament to abolish a £50,000 cap on the colonial governor's education budget.

In 1964, the union merged with the Association of Headmasters and Headmistresses, the Association of Teachers in Technical Institutions, the Association of Teacher Training Staffs, and the Association of Assistant Masters and Mistresses, to form the Jamaica Teachers' Association.
