= Cross Roads, Jamaica =

Primarily commercial neighbourhood of Kingston, Jamaica

Cross Roads 10th.
- Commercial neighbourhood
- Location within Jamaica
- Coordinates: 17.9938°N 76.7880°W
- Country: Jamaica
- City: Kingston

Cross Roads is a primarily commercial neighbourhood of Kingston, Jamaica. It is centered on the intersection of five major roads: Slipe Road, Half Way Tree Road, Old Hope Road, Caledonia Avenue and Marescaux Road.

It is perhaps the geographical centre of Kingston.

== Amenities ==
- Cross Roads Police Station.
- Cross Roads Bus Station – a major transport hub for buses and taxis.
- Cross Roads Post Office.
- Cross Roads Market.
- Carib 5 – a five-screen multiplex cinema since 1997 but originally a 1,750-seat facility designed by John Pike and opening in 1938. The exterior walls are original and retain their impressive 1930s styling.
- The Nuttall Memorial Hospital.
