= Kingston, Jamaica =

Capital and chief port of Jamaica

Kingston
- Capital city
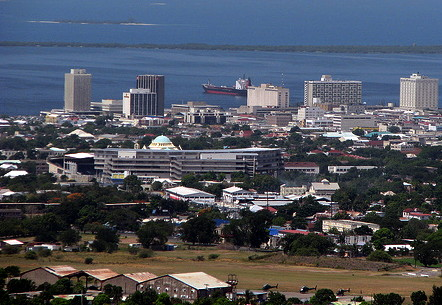
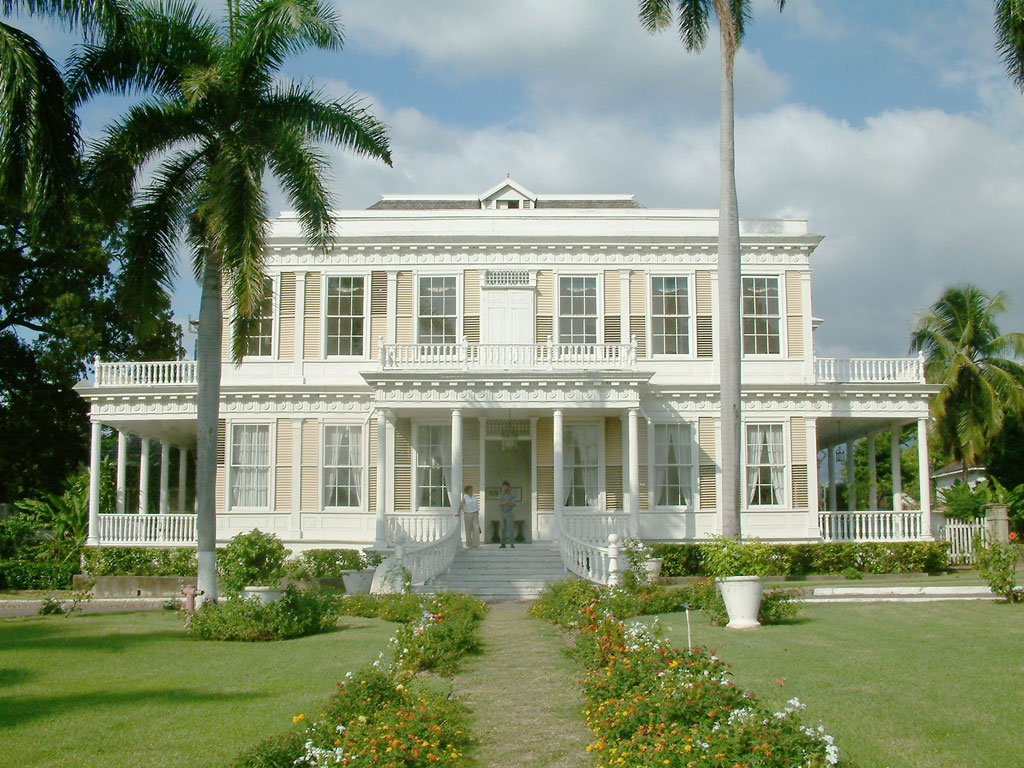
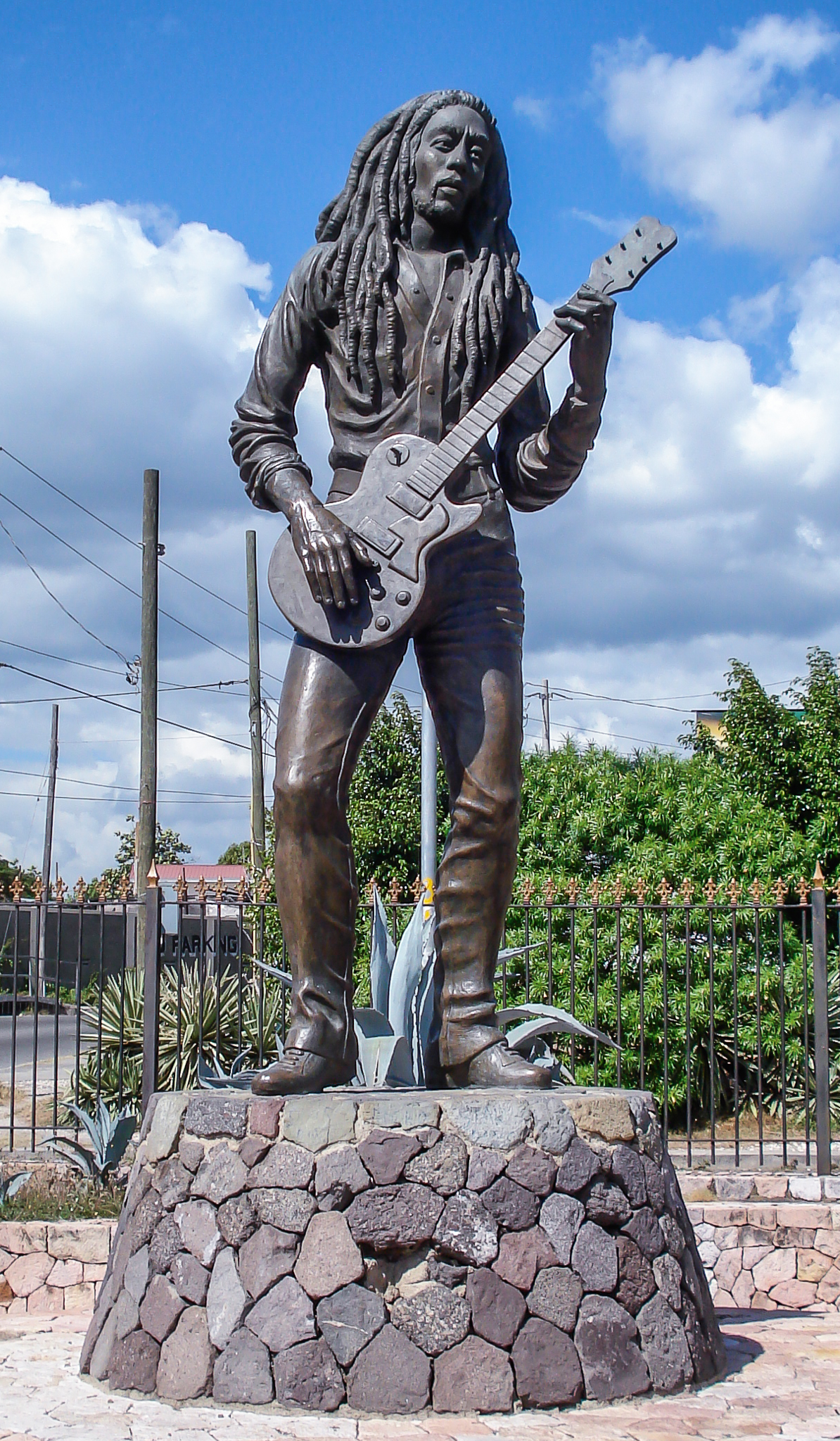
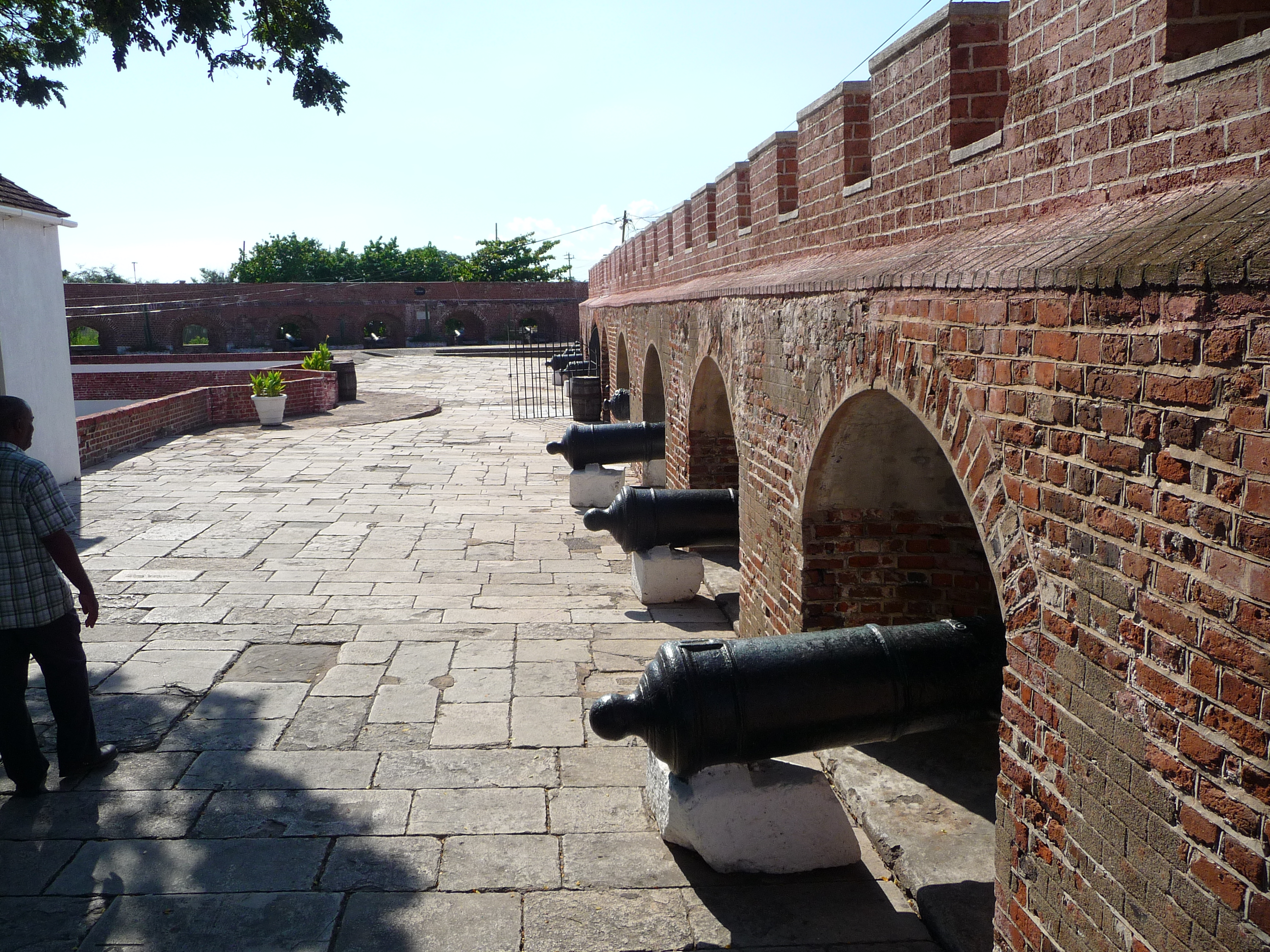
- Kingston Skyline Devon House Bob Marley statue Port Royal
- Motto: A city which hath foundations
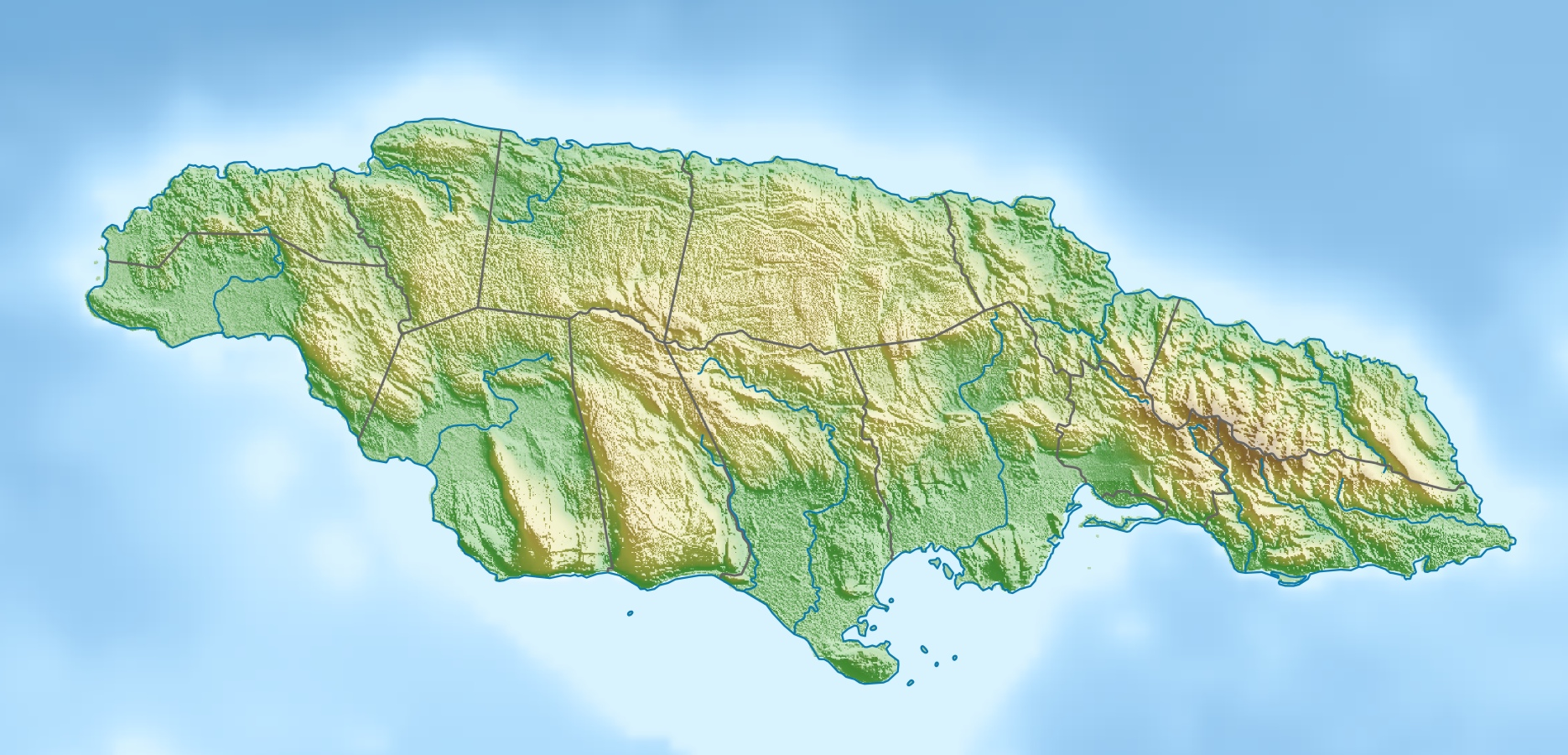
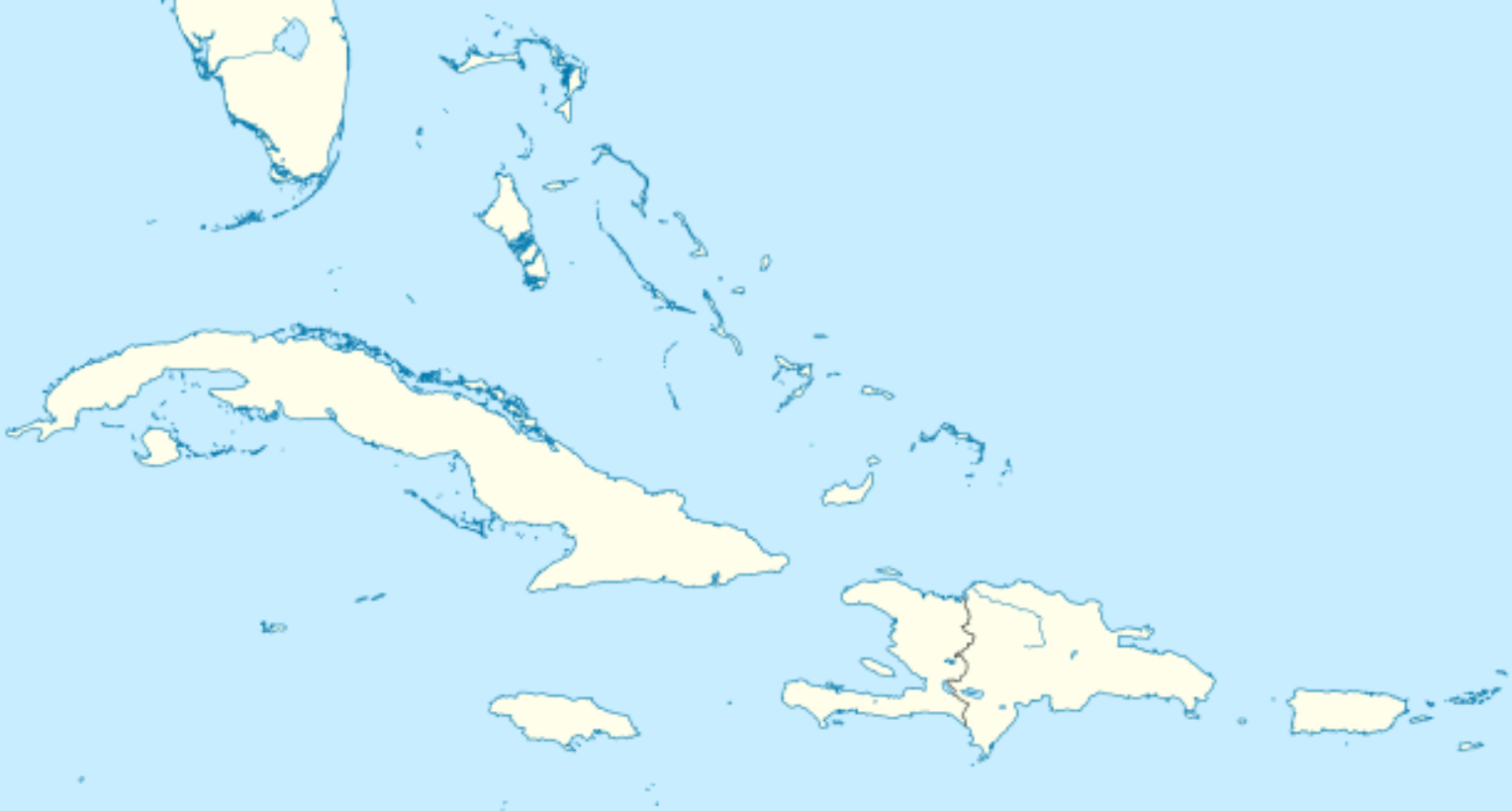
- Location within Jamaica Location within Greater Antilles Location within North America
- Coordinates: 17°58′17″N 76°47′35″W
- Country: Jamaica
- County: Surrey
- Parish: Kingston; St. Andrew
- Established: 22 July 1692

Government
  - Mayor: Andrew Swaby

Area
  - Parish: 25 km^{2} (9.7 sq mi)
- Elevation: 9 m (30 ft)

Population (2011)
  - Parish: 662,435
  - Rank: 65th in North America; 1st in Jamaica
  - Density: 1,346.1/km^{2} (3,486.5/sq mi)
  - Metro: 1,190,000
- Time zone: UTC−05:00 (EST)
- HDI (2023): 0.728 high · 2nd
- Website: ksamc.gov.jm

Kingston is the capital and largest city of Jamaica, located on the southeastern coast of the island. It faces a natural harbour protected by the Palisadoes, a long sand spit which connects the town of Port Royal and Norman Manley International Airport to the rest of the island. Kingston is the largest English-speaking city south of the United States in the Western Hemisphere.

The local government bodies of the parishes of Kingston and St. Andrew were amalgamated by the Kingston and St. Andrew Corporation Act of 1923, to form the Kingston and St. Andrew Corporation. Greater Kingston, or the "Corporate Area" refers to those areas under the KSAC; however, it does not solely refer to Kingston Parish, which only consists of the old downtown and Port Royal. Kingston Parish had a population of 89,057, and St. Andrew Parish had a population of 573,369 in 2011 Kingston is only bordered by Saint Andrew to the east, west and north. The geographical border for the parish of Kingston encompasses the following communities: Tivoli Gardens, Denham Town, Rae Town, Kingston Gardens, National Heroes Park, Bournemouth Gardens, Norman Gardens, Rennock Lodge, Springfield and Port Royal, along with portions of Rollington Town, Franklyn Town, and Allman Town.

The city proper is bounded by Six Miles to the west, Stony Hill to the north, Papine to the northeast, and Harbour View to the east, which are communities in urban and suburban Saint Andrew. Communities in rural St. Andrew such as Gordon Town, Mavis Bank, Lawrence Tavern, Mt. Airy, and Bull Bay would not be described as being in Kingston's city.

Two districts make up the central area of Kingston: the historic Downtown and New Kingston. Both are served by Norman Manley International Airport and also by the smaller and primarily domestic Tinson Pen Aerodrome.

== History ==
Scenes in Kingston after the 1882 fire.

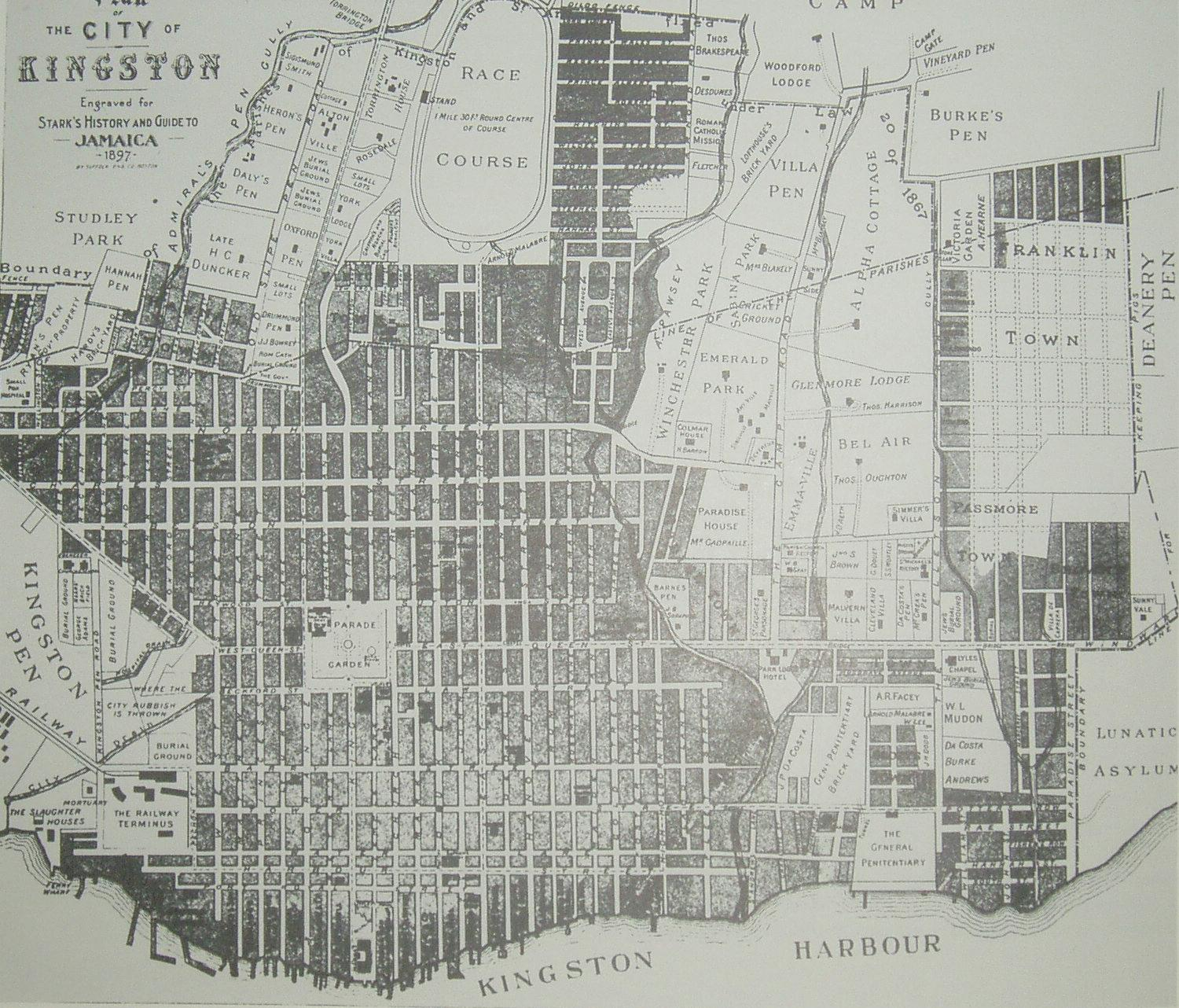
Map of Kingston, 1897

Kingston was founded on 22 July 1692, shortly after the 1692 earthquake that devastated Port Royal; the original section of the city which was situated at the bottom of the Liguanea Plains was laid out to house survivors of that earthquake.

Before the earthquake, Kingston's functions were purely agricultural. The earthquake survivors set up a camp on the sea front. Approximately two thousand people died due to mosquito-borne diseases. Initially, the people lived in a tented camp on Colonel Barry's Hog Crawle. The town did not begin to grow until after the further destruction of Port Royal by fire in 1703. Surveyor John Goffe drew up a plan for the town based on a grid bounded by North, East, West, and Harbour Streets. The new grid system of the town was designed to facilitate commerce, particularly the system of main thoroughfares 66 feet (20 m) across, which allowed transportation between the port and plantations farther inland. By 1716, it had become the largest town and the centre of trade for Jamaica. The government sold land to people with the regulation that they purchase no more than the amount of the land that they owned in Port Royal, and only land on the sea front. Gradually, wealthy merchants began to move their residences from above their businesses to the farm lands north on the plains of Liguanea.

The first free school, Wolmers's, was founded in 1729 and there was a theatre, first on Harbour Street and then moved in 1774 to North Parade. Both are still in existence. In 1755 the governor, Sir Charles Knowles, had decided to transfer the government offices from Spanish Town to Kingston. It was thought by some to be an unsuitable location for the Assembly in proximity to the moral distractions of Kingston, and the next governor rescinded the Act. However, by 1780 the population of Kingston was 11,000, and the merchants began lobbying for the administrative capital to be transferred from Spanish Town, which was by then eclipsed by the commercial activity in Kingston.

The Church of St. Thomas, on King Street, the chief thoroughfare, was first built before 1699 but was rebuilt after the earthquake in 1907. By the end of the 18th century, the city contained more than 3,000 brick buildings. The harbour fostered trade. It was involved in several naval wars of the 18th century. Kingston took over the functions of Spanish Town (the capital at the time). These functions included agriculture, commercial, processing and a main transport hub to and from Kingston and other sections of the island.

In 1788, Kingston had a population of 25,000, which was about a tenth of the overall population of the island. One in every four people living in Kingston was white, but there was a large population of free people of colour there too; two out of every five people living in Kingston were free. The remaining three-fifths of Kingston's population was made up of black slaves.

The government passed an act to transfer the government offices to Kingston from Spanish Town, which occurred in 1872. In 1882, there was a large fire in Kingston. In 1892, electricity first came to Jamaica, when it was supplied from a coal-burning steam-generating plant on Gold Street in Kingston.

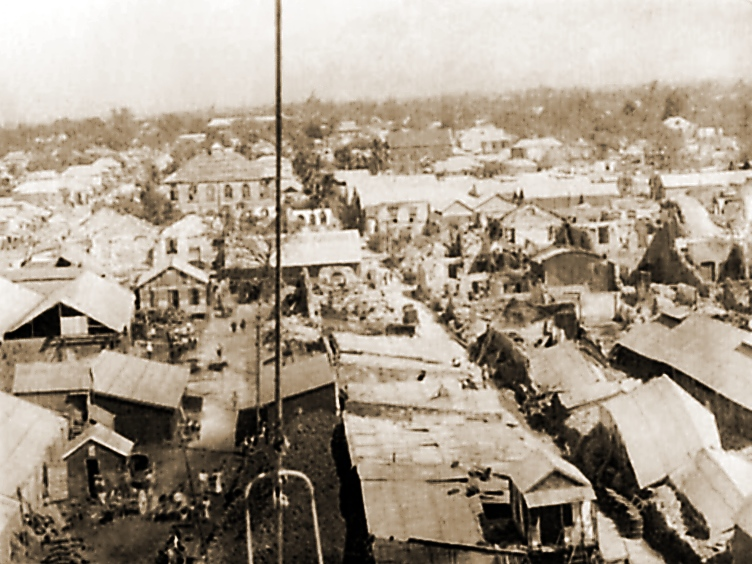
Bird's eye view of Kingston after the 1907 earthquake

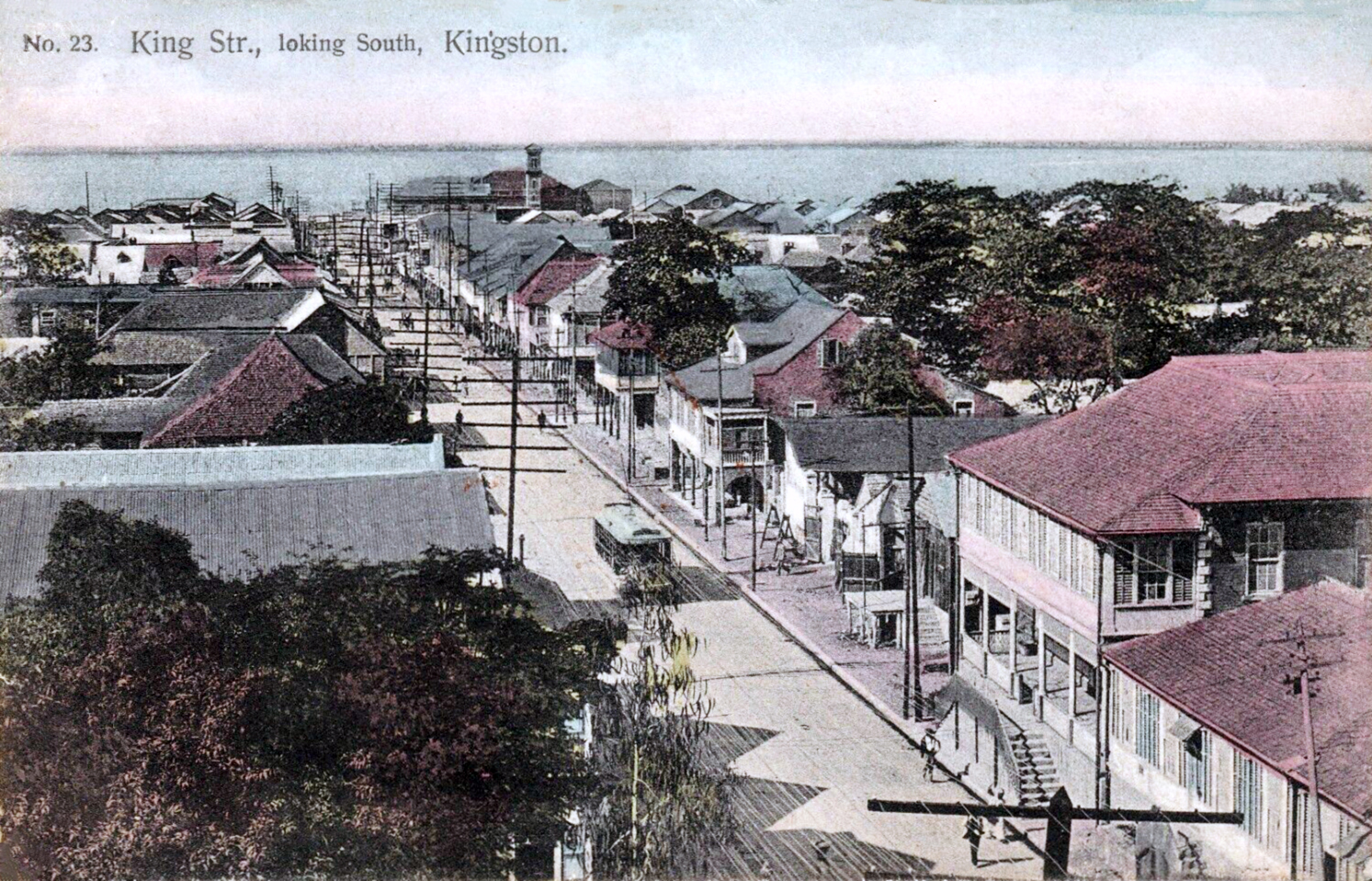
Kingston - King Street, looking south (1908)

In 1907, 800 people died in another earthquake known as the 1907 Kingston earthquake, destroying nearly all the historical buildings south of Parade in the city. That was when a height restriction of no more than 60 feet (18 m) was instituted on buildings in the city centre. These three-story-high buildings were built with reinforced concrete. Construction on King Street in the city was the first area to breach this building code.

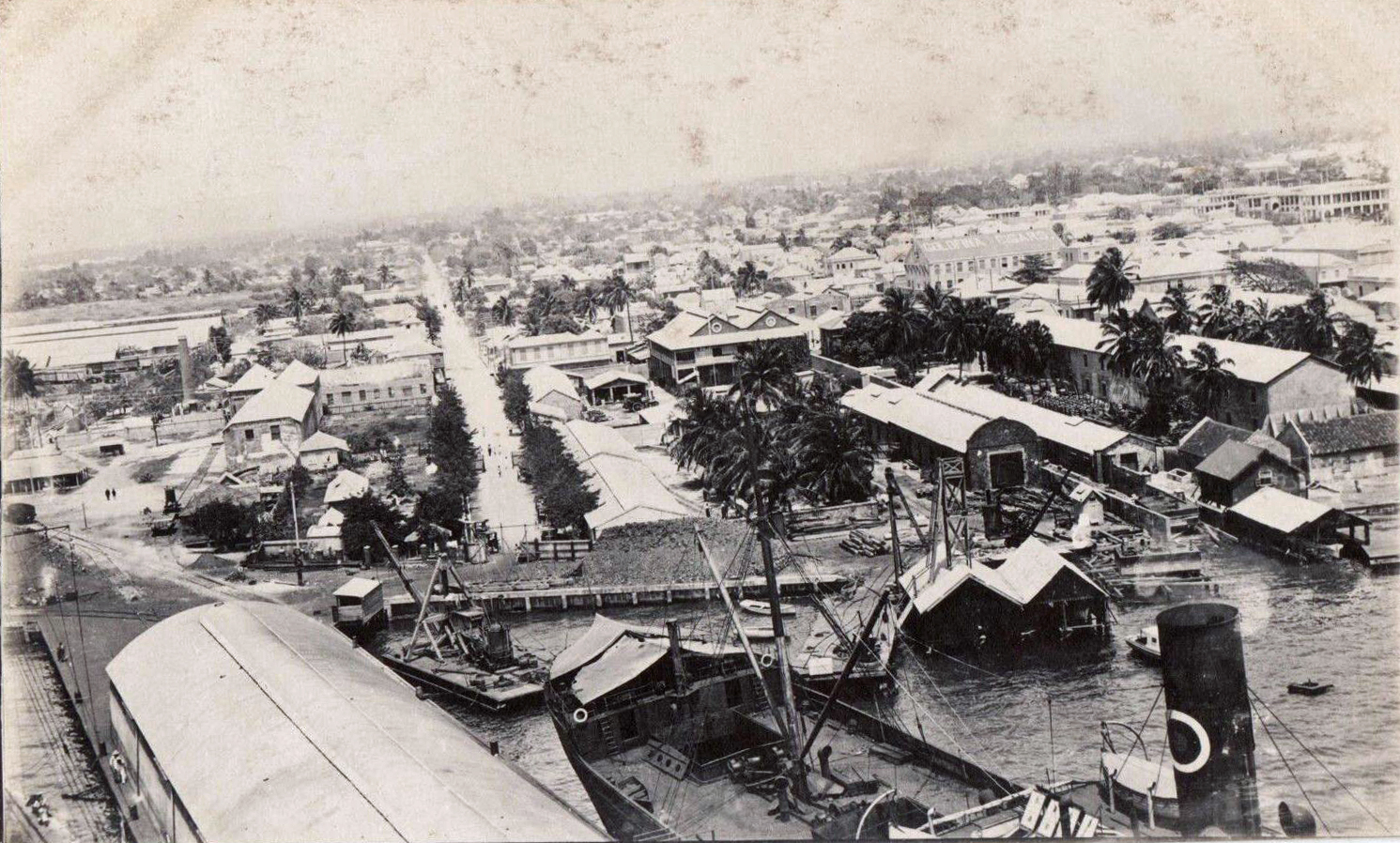
Kingston, Jamaica from the masthead of HMAS Melbourne - 1915

During the 1930s, island-wide riots led to the development of trade unions and political parties to represent workers.

The city became home to the Mona campus of the University of the West Indies. It was founded in 1948, with 24 medical students.

In the 1960s, the international attention of reggae music at that time coincided with the expansion and development of 95 acres (38 ha) of the Kingston city centre waterfront area; by the 1980s, most of the old buildings were demolished by construction companies and the entire waterfront was re-developed with hotels, shops, offices, cultural centres, and cruise and cargo ship facilities.

In 1966, Kingston was the host city to the Commonwealth Games.

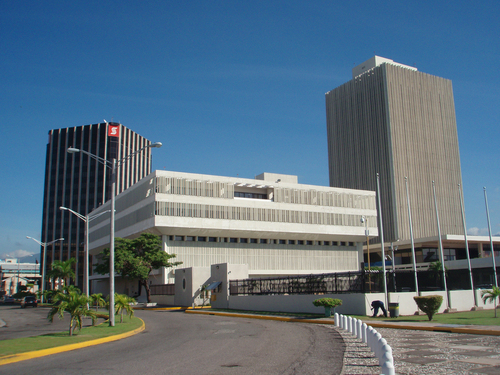
View of the central Kingston waterfront showing the Bank of Nova Scotia and the Bank of Jamaica

In the 1980 general elections, the democratic socialist People's National Party (PNP) government was voted out, and subsequent governments have been more market-oriented and focused on tourism and relations with the United States, which reflected the "turbulent" and "volatile" era, in which Cuba and the United States fought for cultural control over Jamaica.

In the 1990s, crime increased in the region and several riots were reported, including one in 1999 against a rise of fuel prices. In 1999, the Jamaican government ordered army troops to patrol the streets of Kingston in an attempt to curb the violent crime. In 2001, army troops and armoured vehicles used force to "restore order" in Kingston after "three days of unrest leave at least 27 people dead".

In 2010, the Kingston unrest, an armed conflict between Jamaica's military and police forces in Kingston and the Shower Posse drug cartel, attracted international attention. The violence, which largely took place over 24–25 May, killed at least 73 civilians and wounded at least 35 others. and four soldiers and police were also killed.

== Demographics ==
The majority of the population of Kingston is of African descent. Large minority ethnic groups include East Indians and Chinese, who came to the country as indentured servants in the late 19th century. The Chinese occupy important roles in Jamaica's economy especially in the retail markets in Downtown Kingston and the wider metropolitan area. There is also a minority of Europeans, mostly descending from immigrants from Germany and Great Britain. Syrians and Lebanese form one of the most influential ethnic groups in not only Kingston, but the entire island. Though a minority ethnic group, the Lebanese were able to give Jamaica one of its prime ministers, Edward Philip George Seaga. Multi-racial Jamaicans continue to form the second largest racial group, and there is also a small Jewish population in the city.

=== Demographic breakdown ===
- 79.2% Black
- 12.8% Multiracial
- 5.2% Asian
- 3.4% White

== Religion ==
There is a wide variety of Christian churches in the city, most of which are Protestant. The chief denominations are Church of God, Baptist, Anglican, Methodist, Roman Catholic, Seventh-day Adventist and Pentecostal.

There is a strong Roman Catholic community in Kingston. The Holy Trinity Cathedral is the seat of the metropolitan archbishop and was consecrated in 1911. There are several Catholic schools and institutions, including the Immaculate Conception High School and St. Francis Primary and Infant School. Holy Childhood High School was founded and is owned by the Franciscan Missionary Sisters of the Immaculate Heart of Mary of our Lady of Perpetual Help (FMS).

Afro-Christian syncretic religions such as the Rastafari movement also have a significant following.

The Shaare Shalom Synagogue serves Kingston's Jewish population. The city also has communities of Hindus, Buddhists, and Muslims. The Islamic Council of Jamaica and the Islamic Education and Dawah Centre are both located in Kingston. There are three units of the Church of Jesus Christ of Latter-day Saints in the city.

== Economy ==
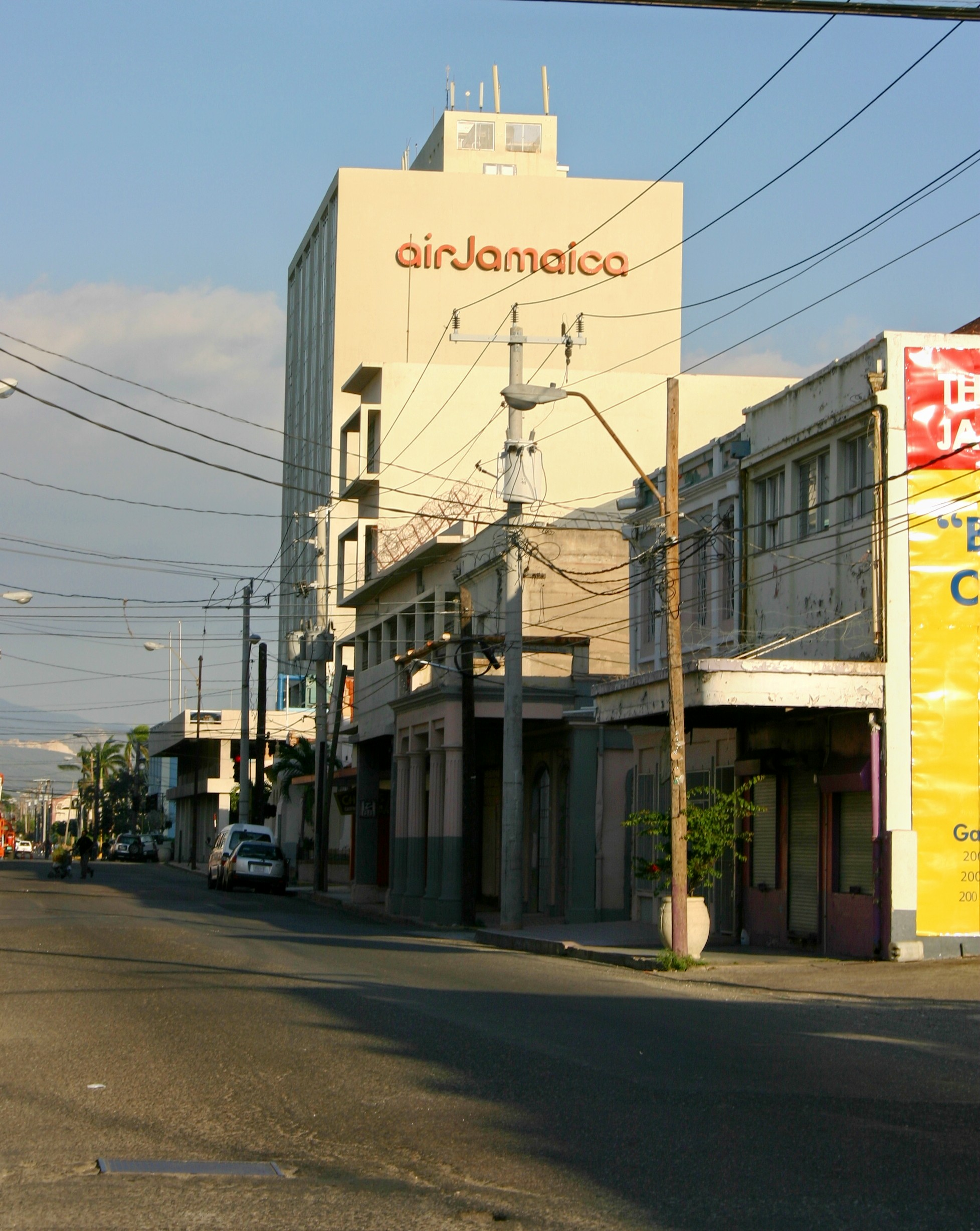
Former Air Jamaica headquarters

Kingston plays a central role in Jamaica's economy. The vast majority of economic activity takes place within Kingston, and as most government ministries are located in the city, it is a key force in legislation in regards to Jamaica's finances. The high population density of the capital city means that the majority of monetary transactions occur in Kingston – stimulating much of Jamaica's local economy. The city is also home to the highest number of schools, hospitals and universities anywhere in Jamaica. Kingston is also the island's main transportation hub and its largest seaport.

Many multinational conglomerates and financial institutions are headquartered in and around the Kingston Metropolitan Area. Air Jamaica was headquartered in Kingston. The idea of making Jamaica an International Financial Centre has also been proposed as a way to boost the city's financial sector and create more jobs, especially for professionals such as accountants and lawyers.

The city's major industries include tourism, apparel manufacturing, and shipping. Many international exports are traded through the city's seaport, with major exports including bauxite, sugar and coffee. The city is also a major tourist destination, and tourism is one of its largest sources of economic activity. The city has suffered economic troubles recently, however, along with the rest of the country of Jamaica. Plans to help the city's economy have made downtown Kingston the subject of numerous redevelopment plans. There have also been attempts to grow the manufacturing industry in the area and to attract call centres to the city.

== Geography ==
Kingston is surrounded by the Blue Mountains, Red Hills, Long Mountain and the Kingston Harbour, which is the seventh largest natural harbour in the world. The city is on the Liguanea plain, an alluvial plain alongside the Hope River. Kingston experiences frequent earthquakes, including the 1907 earthquake.

=== Climate ===
Kingston has a tropical climate, specifically a tropical wet-and-dry climate (Aw/As), characterised by a wet season from May to November, which coincides with the hurricane season, and a dry season from December to April. On October 28, 2025, Hurricane Melissa hit the city as a category 5 hurricane. During the dry season, there is not much rainfall, however, cold and stationary fronts occur at this time, and often bring heavy showers, especially in March. Kingston is in the rain shadow of the Blue Mountains; therefore, little to none of the moisture carried by the Northeast Trade Winds falls over Kingston, causing Kingston to be very dry in comparison to Portland and Saint Mary on the windward side of the Blue Mountains. Kingston is on a coastal location, hence it comes under the influence of the sea, though dense urban development can negate this effect. In the 21st century, Kingston has experienced temperatures as high as 38.8 °C (102 °F) and as low as 13.4 °C (56 °F). Between 1895 and 1990, the total average rainfall was recorded at 813 mm (32.0 in), the highest monthly average rainfall recorded in October at 177 mm (7.0 in), and the lowest monthly average rainfall recorded in March at 18 mm (0.71 in). Fog, hail, thunder and tornadoes are all extremely rare.

Climate data for Kingston (St. George's College, Jamaica)
Month	Jan	Feb	Mar	Apr	May	Jun	Jul	Aug	Sep	Oct	Nov	Dec	Year
Mean daily maximum °C (°F)	30.3 (86.5)	30.2 (86.4)	30.7 (87.3)	31.1 (88.0)	31.6 (88.9)	32.1 (89.8)	32.8 (91.0)	32.7 (90.9)	32.1 (89.8)	31.7 (89.1)	31.2 (88.2)	30.6 (87.1)	31.4 (88.5)
Daily mean °C (°F)	25.7 (78.3)	25.6 (78.1)	26.2 (79.2)	26.9 (80.4)	27.6 (81.7)	28.2 (82.8)	28.6 (83.5)	28.5 (83.3)	28.1 (82.6)	27.6 (81.7)	27.0 (80.6)	26.2 (79.2)	27.2 (81.0)
Mean daily minimum °C (°F)	21.1 (70.0)	21.0 (69.8)	21.6 (70.9)	22.6 (72.7)	23.6 (74.5)	24.2 (75.6)	24.3 (75.7)	24.2 (75.6)	24.0 (75.2)	23.4 (74.1)	22.8 (73.0)	21.8 (71.2)	22.9 (73.2)
Average precipitation mm (inches)	18 (0.7)	19 (0.7)	20 (0.8)	39 (1.5)	100 (3.9)	74 (2.9)	42 (1.7)	98 (3.9)	114 (4.5)	177 (7.0)	65 (2.6)	47 (1.9)	813 (32.0)
Average precipitation days	5	5	5	7	8	7	6	9	11	14	10	6	93
Average relative humidity (%) (at 13:00)	64	64	64	66	68	67	64	66	71	73	69	65	67
Mean monthly sunshine hours	257.3	240.1	260.4	258.0	254.2	237.0	260.4	257.3	213.0	223.2	222.0	235.6	2,918.5
Mean daily sunshine hours	8.3	8.5	8.4	8.6	8.2	7.9	8.4	8.3	7.1	7.2	7.4	7.6	8.0
Source: Meteorological Service (Jamaica)

Climate data for Kingston, Jamaica (Norman Manley International Airport) 1991–2020, extremes 1852–present
Month	Jan	Feb	Mar	Apr	May	Jun	Jul	Aug	Sep	Oct	Nov	Dec	Year
Record high °C (°F)	35.1 (95.2)	34.8 (94.6)	35.1 (95.2)	35.7 (96.3)	35.0 (95.0)	36.9 (98.4)	37.1 (98.8)	36.1 (97.0)	35.8 (96.4)	35.4 (95.7)	37.1 (98.8)	35.0 (95.0)	37.1 (98.8)
Mean daily maximum °C (°F)	30.9 (87.6)	30.9 (87.6)	30.9 (87.6)	31.5 (88.7)	31.9 (89.4)	32.6 (90.7)	33.1 (91.6)	33.1 (91.6)	32.9 (91.2)	32.3 (90.1)	31.9 (89.4)	31.4 (88.5)	31.9 (89.4)
Daily mean °C (°F)	26.6 (79.9)	26.6 (79.9)	26.8 (80.2)	27.6 (81.7)	28.2 (82.8)	29.1 (84.4)	29.3 (84.7)	29.4 (84.9)	29.1 (84.4)	28.5 (83.3)	27.9 (82.2)	27.1 (80.8)	28.0 (82.4)
Mean daily minimum °C (°F)	22.9 (73.2)	22.8 (73.0)	23.3 (73.9)	24.2 (75.6)	25.1 (77.2)	25.9 (78.6)	26.0 (78.8)	25.9 (78.6)	25.7 (78.3)	25.1 (77.2)	24.4 (75.9)	23.5 (74.3)	24.6 (76.3)
Record low °C (°F)	18.5 (65.3)	18.0 (64.4)	18.0 (64.4)	19.2 (66.6)	20.0 (68.0)	21.0 (69.8)	20.6 (69.1)	19.9 (67.8)	20.0 (68.0)	19.0 (66.2)	19.0 (66.2)	18.0 (64.4)	18.0 (64.4)
Average precipitation mm (inches)	14.6 (0.57)	8.8 (0.35)	24.8 (0.98)	27.9 (1.10)	98.6 (3.88)	65.3 (2.57)	56.0 (2.20)	102.0 (4.02)	184.7 (7.27)	161.8 (6.37)	88.3 (3.48)	40.8 (1.61)	885.2 (34.85)
Average precipitation days	10	8	7	9	11	7	6	6	9	12	11	9	105
Average relative humidity (%) (at 13:00)	81	77	76	78	78	75	75	76	78	78	80	81	78
Mean monthly sunshine hours	259.1	246.5	268.1	272.6	253.3	235.3	255.3	252.3	228.9	227.4	238.0	254.9	2,928.9
Mean daily sunshine hours	7.3	7.5	7.8	7.6	7.4	7.8	8.6	8.2	7.8	7.5	7.5	7.3	7.7
Source 1: NOAA, Meteorological Service (Jamaica) (precipitation days, humidity, daily sun)
Source 2: Meteo Climat (record highs and lows)

== Housing ==
In 1848 the Jamaican government expanded Kingston by constructing new homes in the west, north and east of the city. This housing became highly segregated in terms of race and class and by 1860 the majority of white elites lived on the outskirts of the city.

As Kingston's population grew, existing settlements became so densely occupied that marshes in the southwest were filled in to allow the development of new housing. By 1935, continued population growth and poverty resulted in the emergence of slums in the east and west of the city. Later these areas were demolished by the government and residents were rehoused in Denham Town. This development accommodated 3,000 people, leaving more than one sixth of displaced resident homeless. Consequently, overcrowding persisted throughout the city; further, cramped living conditions resulted in public health issues.

Suburbanization also became significant and by the 1960s this residential area spread to the foothills of the Blue Mountains. Subsequently, the lack of space and continued consumerism meant this area then expanded to the east of the mountains.

In Kingston, 20% of the population now live in squatter settlements. Contrastingly, Kingston is also home to Red Hills, Norbrook, Cherry Gardens, Stony Hill, Jack's Hill, suburbs that hold some of the most expensive houses in all of Jamaica.

== Parks ==
The city of Kingston is home to a number of urban parks which are frequently transformed to accommodate various events and festivities on the Jamaican calendar. The most popular parks include: Emancipation Park, Hope Gardens, Devon House, National Heroes' Park, St William Grant Park and Mandela Park.

=== Emancipation Park ===
The Liguanea Club, a recreational and social club for the upper class in society, located on Knutsford Boulevard, owned over 35 acres (14 ha) of land including the former Liguanea Park now the site of Emancipation Park. The club gave the land measuring seven acres as a gift to the Jamaican Government.

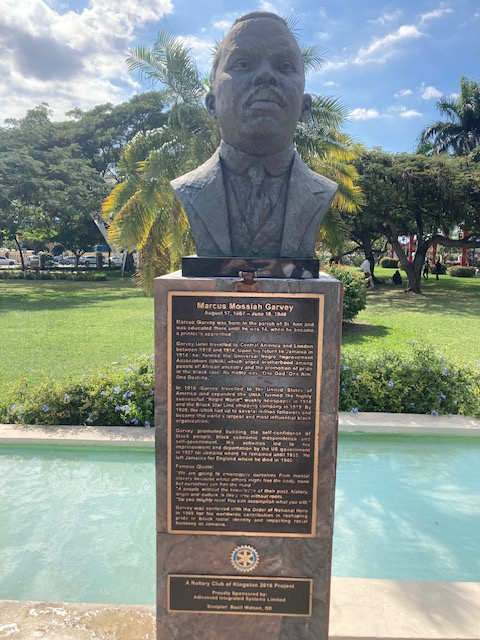
A bust of Marcus Garvey in Emancipation Park

Several government members argued that the land should be converted into a business district, while others felt a multi-functional entertainment complex should be built on the site. The large financial input needed for either venture, was not forthcoming. In 2002 Cabinet granted approval for the transfer of the land to the National Housing Trust on the condition that a park was built and maintained at that location. The land was transferred for one Jamaican dollar.

The park is well known for the 11 ft. (approximately 3m) high bronze sculpture done by Jamaican artist Laura Facey, situated at the park's main entrance. This prominent sculpture comprises two naked black male and female statues gazing to the skies – symbolic of their triumphant rise from the horrors of slavery. The statue was unveiled in July 2003, in time for the park's first anniversary which caused an out cry from the Jamaican populace who believed that the blatant nudity and generous bodily proportions of the figures were very inappropriate to depict the freedom of black people.

=== Hope Gardens ===
The Royal Botanical Gardens at Hope, popularly called Hope Gardens serves as a national attraction. The Hope Gardens is a part of the 2,000 acres (809 ha) of land making it the largest botanical garden in the English-speaking Caribbean. The land situated by the foothills of the Blue Mountains was originally owned by Major Richard Hope from whom it got its name. Two hundred acres of this land was obtained by the Government of Jamaica in 1880 and was originally established as a plant introduction and crop-testing facility for plants such as pineapple, cocoa, coffee and tobacco. The formal Botanical Gardens were laid out on approximately 60 acres (24 ha) of this land with the assistance of personnel from the Kew Gardens in England.

In the 1950s, the Queen, after visiting the island and being pleased with the state of the gardens, gave permission for it to be called the Royal Botanical Gardens, Hope. The Gardens have many exotic species along with some endemic trees of Jamaica. Over the years, the ravages of hurricanes and other disasters have resulted in the loss of a significant number of species. However, there are still some prominent trees and popular sites to be viewed in the Gardens. At Hope Gardens, visitors can view a number of other features including the Coconut Museum, the Sunken Gardens, the Orchid House, the Lily Pond, the Maze and Palm Avenue.

The Hope Gardens has an adjoining zoo referred to as Hope Gardens Zoo. The gardens and zoo are undergoing redevelopment to improve the physical landscape and the animal inventory as a part of Bring Back The Hope campaign.

== Transport ==
=== Road ===
The St William Grant Park (Parade) in the heart of downtown Kingston is the starting point for three of Jamaica's four A roads, namely the A1 (Kingston to Lucea), the A3 (Kingston to Saint Ann's Bay) and the A4 (Kingston to Annotto Bay), while the city itself is provided with a dense network of trunk, main, secondary and minor roads. It also consists of the Highway 2000, Jamaica which runs through Portmore, Ocho Rios and Mandeville. A new section of Highway 2000, Jamaica (called "T3") was recently opened to the public. It has greatly reduced the travel time between Kingston and Montego Bay from 4 hours to a mere 2 1/2 hours.

Kingston is served well by a modern bus system, The Jamaica Urban Transit Company (JUTC), as well as mini buses and taxis, which operate throughout the city with major hubs at Parade, Cross Roads, and Half Way Tree.

=== Buses ===
In June 1898, the existing mule car service was phased out and a transition to electric trams, initially operated by the West India Electric Company and later by the Jamaica Public Service Company, was undertaken. This transition to the electric tram was completed on 31 March 1899. This service continued to operate, but the inflexibility of a tram service could not keep pace with a growing city, and the tram service ceased to operate on 7 August 1948.

Between 1948 and 1953, a motor bus service was operated by a company called Jamaica Utilities. The government revoked its franchise in 1953.

From 1953 to 1983, the Jamaica Omnibus Service operated a service, which at its peak consisted of over 600 buses and served an area spanning Spanish Town, Border, Mt. James, Bull Bay and Port Royal. It was wound up by the government in 1983 after being nationalised in 1974.

Kingston is served well by a modern bus system, the Jamaica Urban Transit Company (JUTC), mini buses, and taxis, which operate throughout the city with major hubs at Parade, Cross Roads, Half Way Tree and elsewhere.

=== Rail ===
The now disused Kingston railway station served the Kingston to Montego Bay main line with branches from Spanish Town to Ewarton, Bog Walk to Port Antonio, Linstead to New Works and May Pen to Frankfield.

The railway station opened in 1845 and closed in October 1992 when all passenger traffic on Jamaica's railways abruptly ceased.

=== Air ===
Kingston's international airport is the Norman Manley International Airport, while Tinson Pen Aerodrome in Kingston provides domestic services.

=== Sea ===
Historically, the Kingston waterfront was Jamaica's main port with many finger piers at which freighters and passenger liners could dock. More recently, with the containerisation of freight, the port has moved to Newport West.

== Emergency services ==
Jamaica's police force, the Jamaica Constabulary Force, is based on Old Hope Road near Liguanea. Smaller police stations, such as Hunt's Bay, Matilda's Corner and Half-Way-Tree, are dispersed across the Corporate Area. The Supreme Court of Jamaica is also located in Kingston. Other courts, such as the Half-Way-Tree Resident Magistrate's Court, Gun Court, Traffic Court and Family Court, make Kingston their home. The Jamaica Defence Force (JDF) has its headquarters at Up Park Camp near New Kingston and Cross Roads. The JDF also operates a major naval base at Port Royal.

Crime rates are high in and around Kingston and Montego Bay, and include gang violence and shootings in inner city areas. The highest-crime areas include West Kingston, Grants Pen, August Town, Harbour View and Spanish Town.

=== Fire service ===
Fire response in Kingston is provided by the Jamaica Fire Brigade, the national fire service. The service operates from fire stations spread throughout the Corporate Area. Fire stations are located at

- York Park (HQ)
- Half-Way-Tree
- Rollington Town
- Port Royal
- Norman Manley International Airport
- Stony Hill
- Trench Town
- Kingston Harbour (Fire Boat)

== Media ==
The Gleaner Company, the Jamaica Observer and the Sunday Herald, three of Jamaica's large newspaper companies, make their home in Kingston. Several television and radio stations including Television Jamaica (TVJ), CVM TV, RJR 94 FM, TBC Radio 88.5 FM, Hitz 92 FM, FAME 95 FM, LOVE TV, ZIP 103, Kool 97 FM and LOVE FM, are all based in Kingston.

== Sports ==
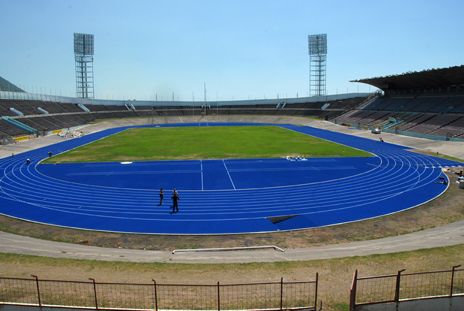
Independence Park National Stadium

Cricket, including test matches, is played at Sabina Park. The capital is home to five association football teams who play in Jamaica's National Premier League. The teams are Arnett Gardens, Boys' Town, Harbour View, Maverley Hughenden and Waterhouse. Olympic Sprinter Shelly-Ann Fraser-Pryce also was born and raised in the suburb of Waterhouse.

== Telecommunications ==
=== Fixed voice and broadband ===
Fixed voice and broadband services in Kingston are provided by either FLOW and Digicel (via their new Digicel Play service which is exclusive to the Kingston Metropolitan Area). FLOW uses a Hybrid Fibre and Coaxial network to provide IPTV, VoIP & POTS and broadband capable of speeds up to 100 Mbit/s. FLOW also uses a Copper network to provide POTS and ADSL capable of speeds up to 12 Mbit/s. Digicel uses a GPON fibre-optic network, providing IPTV, VoIP and broadband speeds of up to 200 Mbit/s. Digicel's Fibre-optic network boasts capacity of up to 10 Gbit/s.

=== Mobile voice and broadband ===
Mobile voice and broadband services in Kingston are dominated by incumbents, FLOW and Digicel. Both carriers provide GSM, EDGE, HSPA, HSPA+ and LTE connectivity in and around the city.

FLOW offers HSPA+ of up to 21 Mbit/s on 850 MHz and 1900 MHz. FLOW also offers DC-HSDPA (commonly known as DC-HSPA+) allowing capable devices speeds of up to 42 Mbit/s on contiguous 1900 MHz spectrum.

Digicel also offers 21 Mbit/s HSPA+ however, they also offer DC-HSDPA (commonly known as DC-HSPA+) allowing capable devices speeds of up to 42 Mbit/s on contiguous 850 MHz spectrum. Digicel was also first to market with LTE in Jamaica. Their network covers all of Kingston Parish and most of the populous areas in the Kingston Metropolitan Area, capable of speeds of up to 75 Mbit/s on 10 MHz of Band 17 spectrum.

FLOW also offers LTE in Kingston. FLOW's LTE network is accessible on Band 4 or AWS spectrum. Due to the network delaying its rollout to acquire more spectrum, its network is theoretically faster than both Digicel and Caricel, to the tune of 150 Mbit/s (20 MHz of Bandwidth) with further plans to add low band spectrum, possibly increasing theoretical speeds up to 225 Mbit/s.

Kingston is also home to Caricel, Jamaica's newest telecoms operator, which deployed its LTE network first to the Kingston Metropolitan Area.

In addition, both carriers have their Jamaican head offices in the city (with the exception of Digicel, which has its company headquarters in Kingston rather than a regional office there as is the case with FLOW, which is based in Miami).

== Institutions ==
Kingston, as the capital, is the financial, cultural, economic and industrial centre of Jamaica. Many financial institutions are based in Kingston, and the city boasts the largest number of hospitals, schools, universities and cultural attractions of any urban area on the island. Notable Kingston landmarks include the University of the West Indies, Jamaica Defence Force Museum, and Bob Marley Museum. A United Nations agency, the International Seabed Authority is headquartered in Kingston.

== Notable People; Cultural Figures ==
- Hopeton Overton Brown, better known as Scientist, was born in Kingston in 1960. He is a prolific, highly influential recording engineer and producer who rose to fame in the 1970s and the 1980s mixing dub music. Working as protégé of King Tubby, Scientist's innovations significantly helped to pioneer the genre, elevating reggae music to new heights.
- Vivian Neville Jackson (14 August 1946 – 12 January 2010),better known as Yabby You, was a roots reggae vocalist and producer, who came to prominence in the early to late 1970s through his uncompromising self-produced work of committed, spiritual character. Jackson was born in the Waterhouse district of Kingston.
- Osbourne Ruddock (28 January 1941 – 6 February 1989), better known as King Tubby, was born in Kingston. He was a Jamaican sound engineer who profoundly influenced the development of dub music and reggae in the 1960s and 1970s.

== Twin towns – Sister cities ==
Kingston is twinned with:

- Miami-Dade County, Florida, United States
- Kalamazoo, Michigan, United States
- Topeka, Kansas, United States
- Gibraltar, United Kingdom
- Kingston-upon-Hull, East Riding of Yorkshire, England, United Kingdom
- Coventry, Warwickshire, England, United Kingdom
- Guadalajara, Mexico
- Shenzhen, People's Republic of China
- Windhoek, Namibia

== See also ==
- List of metropolitan areas in the West Indies
- List of people from Kingston, Jamaica
- Roy Anthony Bridge
- Trenchtown
