= Hopewell =

Hopewell may refer to:

== Places ==
=== Barbados ===
- Hopewell, Christ Church
- Hopewell, Saint Thomas

=== Canada ===
- Hopewell Parish, New Brunswick
- Hopewell Cape, New Brunswick
- Hopewell Rocks, a tourist attraction new Hopewell Cape
- Hopewell, Newfoundland and Labrador
- Hopewell, Nova Scotia

=== Jamaica ===
- Hopewell, Clarendon
- Hopewell, Hanover
- Hopewell, Manchester
- Hopewell, Saint Andrew
- Hopewell, Saint Ann
- Hopewell, Saint Elizabeth
- Hopewell, Westmoreland
- Hopewell Hall, Saint Thomas, Jamaica

=== South Africa ===
- Hopewell, KwaZulu-Natal

=== United States ===
==== Alabama ====
- Hopeful, Alabama, formerly Hopewell
- Hopewell, Cleburne County, Alabama
- Hopewell, DeKalb County, Alabama
- Hopewell, Jefferson County, Alabama
- Hopewell, Lee County, Alabama
- McCord Crossroads, Alabama, formerly Hopewell
- West Greene, Alabama, formerly Hopewell

==== Arkansas ====
- Hopewell, Boone County, Arkansas
- Hopewell, Cleburne County, Arkansas
- Hopewell, Greene County, Arkansas
- Hopewell, Lawrence County, Arkansas

==== Connecticut ====
- Hopewell, Fairfield County, Connecticut
- Hopewell, Hartford County, Connecticut

==== Florida ====
- Hopewell Gardens, Florida
- Hopewell, Hillsborough County, Florida
- Hopewell, Madison County, Florida

==== Georgia ====
- Ceres, Georgia, formerly Hopewell
- Hopewell, Camden County, Georgia
- Hopewell, Fulton County, Georgia
- Hopewell, Harris County, Georgia

==== Illinois ====
- Hopewell, Illinois

==== Indiana ====
- Hopewell, DeKalb County, Indiana
- Hopewell, Johnson County, Indiana

==== Iowa ====
- Hopewell, Iowa

==== Kansas ====
- Hopewell, Pratt County, Kansas

==== Kentucky ====
- Hopewell, Greenup County, Kentucky

==== Maryland ====
- Hopewell, Howard County, Maryland
- Hopewell, St. Mary's County, Maryland
- Hopewell, Somerset County, Maryland
- Hopewell (Providence, Maryland), a historic house
- Hopewell (Union Bridge, Maryland)
- Hopewell Village, Maryland
- Spencers Wharf, Maryland, formerly Hopewell

==== Mississippi ====
- Hopewell, Benton County, Mississippi
- Hopewell, Calhoun County, Mississippi
- Hopewell, Clay County, Mississippi
- Hopewell, Copiah County, Mississippi
- Hopewell, Covington County, Mississippi
- Hopewell, Marion County, Mississippi
- Hopewell Landing, Mississippi
- Warrenton, Mississippi, formerly Hopewell

==== Missouri ====
- Hopewell, Warren County, Missouri
- Hopewell, Washington County, Missouri

==== New Jersey ====
- Hopewell, New Jersey, in Mercer County
- Hopewell, Sussex County, New Jersey
- Hopewell Township, New Jersey (disambiguation)

==== New Mexico ====
- Hopewell, New Mexico

==== New York ====
- Hopewell, New York

==== North Carolina ====
- Hopewell, Mecklenburg County, North Carolina
- Hopewell, Rutherford County, North Carolina
- Hopewell, Wayne County, North Carolina

==== Ohio ====
- Hopewell, Jefferson County, Ohio
- Hopewell, Muskingum County, Ohio
- Hopewell, Seneca County, Ohio
- Hopewell Heights, Ohio, also known as Hopewell

==== Oklahoma ====
- Hopewell, Oklahoma

==== Oregon ====
- Hopewell, Oregon

==== Pennsylvania ====
- Hopewell, Bedford County, Pennsylvania
- Hopewell, Chester County, Pennsylvania
- Hopewell (on Hammer Creek), Lancaster County
- Hopewell, Westmoreland County, Pennsylvania

==== South Carolina ====
- Hopewell, Williamsburg County, South Carolina, which is partially in Georgetown County
- Hopewell, York County, South Carolina

==== Tennessee ====
- Hopewell, Bradley County, Tennessee
- Hopewell, Cannon County, Tennessee
- Hopewell, Carroll County, Tennessee
- Hopewell, Claiborne County, Tennessee
- Hopewell, Davidson County, Tennessee
- Hopewell, Decatur County, Tennessee
- Hopewell, Gibson County, Tennessee
- Hopewell, Maury County, Tennessee
- Hopewell, Tipton County, Tennessee
- Hopewell Mill, Tennessee
- Hopewell Springs, Tennessee

==== Texas ====
- Hopewell, Franklin County, Texas
- Hopewell, Houston County, Texas
- Hopewell, Lamar County, Texas
- Hopewell, Leon County, Texas
- Hopewell, Red River County, Texas

==== Virginia ====
- Hopewell, Virginia, an independent city formerly part of Prince George County
- Hopewell, Fauquier County, Virginia
- Hopewell, Pittsylvania County, Virginia
- Hopewell, Bourbon County, now Paris, Kentucky

==== West Virginia ====
- Hopewell, Barbour County, West Virginia
- Hopewell, Fayette County, West Virginia
- Hopewell, Marion County, West Virginia
- Hopewell, Preston County, West Virginia
- Hopewell (Millville, West Virginia)

== Schools ==
- Hopewell Academy (Hopewell, New Jersey)
- Hopewell Academy, in North Carolina
- Hopewell Area School District, in Pennsylvania
- Hopewell School (disambiguation)
- Hopewell High School (disambiguation)

== Other uses ==
- Hopewell (surname), for people with this name
- Hopewell (band), an American rock band
- Hopewell Holdings, Hong Kong listed company
- Hopewell tradition, a Native American material culture
  - Hopewell pottery, the ceramic tradition of the cultures of the Hopewell tradition
  - Hopewell Culture National Historical Park in Ohio
- The Hopewell Project, a solar power project
- Bangkok Elevated Road and Train System, commonly known as the Hopewell Project, an infrastructure construction project
- Hopewell, the plantation of Andrew Pickens in northwest South Carolina
  - Treaty of Hopewell, three treaties between the U.S. and Native Americans signed at the South Carolina plantation
- USS Hopewell, two ships of the US Navy
- Hopewell Fund, a United States nonprofit organization

== See also ==
- Hopewell Center (disambiguation)
- Hopewell Presbyterian Church (disambiguation)
- Hopewell Township (disambiguation)
