= Hopewell (surname) =

Hopewell is a surname and occasional given name. Notable people with the name include:

- Charles Hopewell (1861–1931), mayor of Ottawa
- Chris Hopewell (fl. 2003–2020), English music video director
- Jacob Hopewell (1831–1875), American inventor and eccentric
- John Hopewell (1920–2015), British urologist
- Menra Hopewell (1821–1881), American physician and author
- Nicola Hopewell (born 1991), English professional boxer
- Pollard Hopewell (between 1786 and 1789–1813), US Navy midshipman with two navy ships named after him
- Raymont Hopewell (born 1971), American serial killer
- William Hopewell (1867–1928), English footballer
- Hopewell Chin'ono, Zimbabwean journalist and filmmaker

== See also ==
- Hopewell (disambiguation)
