= Hopewell Presbyterian Church =

Hopewell Presbyterian Church may refer to:

- Hopewell Presbyterian Church (Hopewell, Johnson County, Indiana), listed on the NRHP in Johnson County, Indiana
- Hopewell Presbyterian Church (Oxford, Mississippi), listed on the NRHP in Lafayette County, Mississippi
- Hopewell Presbyterian Church (Crawford, New York), listed on the NRHP in New York
- Hopewell Presbyterian Church and Cemetery, Huntersville, North Carolina, NRHP-listed
- Hopewell Presbyterian Church and Hopewell Cemetery, Florence, South Carolina, NRHP-listed
- Hopewell Presbyterian Church and Cemetery near Huntersville, Mecklenburg County, North Carolina.
