= Louis Blanchette =

Louis Blanchette (11 July 1739 – August 1793) was an explorer and likely fur trader in North America in the 18th century. He was from New France. He explored areas of what is now Missouri, and is notable as the founder of the city of St. Charles on the Missouri River in 1769.

== Background ==
According to Hopewell's Legends of the Missouri and Mississippi (1874):

In the year 1765, a French Canadian, called Blanchette Chasseur, animated by that love of adventure which characterizes all who have lived a roving and restless life, ascended the Missouri, with a few followers, for the purpose of forming a settlement in the then remote wilderness.

He was one of those who encountered perils and endured privations, not from necessity, but from choice; for he had been born to affluence, and had every indulgence consistent with wealth and station, but from a boy had spurned, with Spartan prejudice, every effeminate trait, and had accomplished himself in every hardy and manly exercise. When he had attained his majority, he sailed for America, then the El Dorado of all the visionary, roving and restless spirits of the age.

According to Hopewell's account, Blanchette met another Frenchman (Bernard Guillet) in 1765 at the future site of St. Charles. Blanchette, determined to settle there, asked if Guillet, who had become the chief of a Dakota band, had chosen a name for it.

"I called the place 'Les Petites Côtes' " replied Bernard, "from the sides of the hills that you see."

"By that name shall it be called," said Blanchette Chasseur, "for it is the echo of nature -- beautiful from its simplicity."

Hopewell's account is suspect on several details. For one, he appears to have conflated Blanchette's trade as a hunter (chasseur in French) with a surname.

Blanchette settled there in 1769 under the authority of the Spanish governor of Upper Louisiana, and served as its civil and military leader until his death in 1793. During this time perhaps only a couple dozen buildings were built. Although the settlement was under Spanish jurisdiction, the settlers themselves remained primarily French nationals. He is buried in St. Charles Borromeo cemetery, St. Charles, Missouri.
