= Hopewell Center =

Hopewell Center or Hopewell Centre may refer to:

China

- Hopewell Centre (Hong Kong)

United States

- Hopewell, Seneca County, Ohio, also Hopewell Center
- Hopewell Center, New York
- Hopewell Center, Pennsylvania
