= Hopewell Township, Pennsylvania =

Hopewell Township may refer to:

- Hopewell Township, Beaver County, Pennsylvania
- Hopewell Township, Bedford County, Pennsylvania
- Hopewell Township, Cumberland County, Pennsylvania
- Hopewell Township, Huntingdon County, Pennsylvania
- Hopewell Township, Washington County, Pennsylvania
- Hopewell Township, York County, Pennsylvania

== See also ==
- Hopewell, Pennsylvania (disambiguation)
- East Hopewell Township, York County, Pennsylvania
- North Hopewell Township, Pennsylvania
