= Hopewell Township, New Jersey =

Hopewell Township is the name of some places in the U.S. state of New Jersey:

- Hopewell Township, Cumberland County, New Jersey
- Hopewell Township, Mercer County, New Jersey

== See also ==
- Hopewell Township (disambiguation)
