= USS Hopewell (DD-181) =

Wickes-class destroyer

Coordinates: 49°0′N 17°0′W

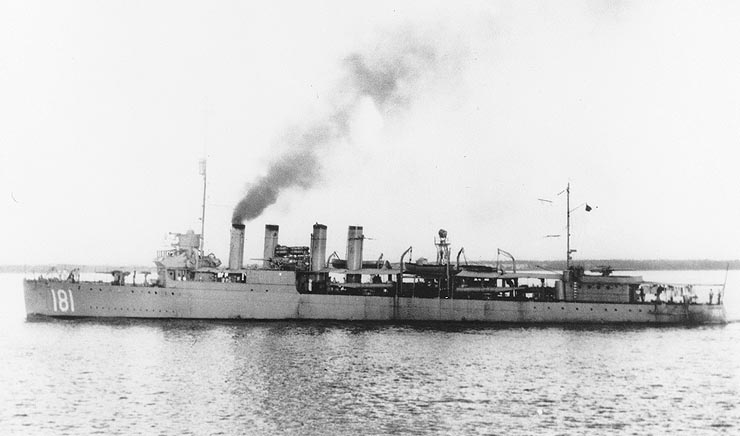
- USS Hopewell under steam.

History

United States
- Name: Hopewell
- Namesake: Pollard Hopewell
- Builder: Newport News Shipbuilding
- Laid down: 19 January 1918
- Launched: 8 June 1918
- Commissioned: 22 March 1919
- Decommissioned: 17 July 1922
- Recommissioned: 17 June 1940
- Decommissioned: 23 September 1940
- Identification: DD-181
- Fate: Transferred to UK, 23 September 1940

United Kingdom
- Name: Bath
- Commissioned: 23 September 1940
- Identification: Pennant number: I17
- Fate: Transferred to Norway, 1941

Norway
- Name: Bath
- Acquired: 9 April 1941
- Fate: Sunk 19 August 1941

General characteristics
- Class & type: Wickes-class destroyer
- Displacement: 1,060 long tons (1,077 t)
- Length: 314 ft 5 in (95.83 m)
- Beam: 31 ft 8 in (9.65 m)
- Draft: 9 ft 4 in (2.84 m)
- Propulsion: 2 × steam turbines; 2 × shafts
- Speed: 35 kn (65 km/h; 40 mph)
- Complement: 101 officers and enlisted
- Armament: 4 × 4 in (100 mm) guns; 2 × 3 in (76 mm); 4 × 21 inch (533 mm) torpedo tubes

The first USS Hopewell (DD–181) was a Wickes-class destroyer in the United States Navy, entering service in 1919. After a brief active life, the ship was deactivated in 1922 and placed in reserve for 18 years before returning to service in 1940 during World War II. She was later transferred to the Royal Navy as HMS Bath (I17), as a Town-class destroyer, and then to the Royal Norwegian Navy as HNoMS Bath. Bath was torpedoed while escorting a trans-Atlantic convoy on 19 August 1941.

== Construction and career ==
=== United States Navy service ===
Named for Pollard Hopewell, she was launched by Newport News Shipbuilding, Newport News, Virginia on 8 June 1918; sponsored by Mrs. Orote Hutcheson. The destroyer was commissioned on 22 March 1919 at Portsmouth, Virginia.

Hopewell sailed from Norfolk on 19 April 1919 to join the 3rd Destroyer Squadron in New England waters, and in May was on observation station off the Azores during the historic crossing of the Atlantic by Navy seaplanes. The destroyer returned to New York City on 8 June to complete her interrupted fitting out, and rejoined her squadron in August for firing tests. The winter of 1920 was spent on intensive training and target practice in Caribbean waters.

The ship returned to New England in early May, where she remained until September training reservists and engaging in division maneuvers. Arriving at Charleston, South Carolina on 22 September, Hopewell carried out similar operations out of the South Carolina port, returning to New York in May 1921 for reserve training. Sailing from Newport, Rhode Island on 10 October, the destroyer was placed in reserve at Charleston until 10 April, when she departed for Philadelphia, Pennsylvania. Hopewell decommissioned there on 17 July 1922.

She recommissioned on 17 June 1940 as the United States prepared for World War II, and after operating with the Neutrality Patrol off New England arrived at Halifax, Nova Scotia on 18 September. She decommissioned on 23 September and was transferred to the UK as part of the Destroyers for Bases Agreement.

=== Royal Navy service ===
Renamed HMS Bath, she crossed the Atlantic and arrived at Devenport naval base on 12 October 1940, and after a short refit, joined the 1st Minelaying Squadron based at the Kyle of Lochalsh. Bath was used to escort minesweeping operations by the squadron and for convoys. At the end of January 1941, Bath went into refit at Chatham Dockyard to better suit her for escort duties. The aft 4-inch and 3-inch guns were removed and replaced by a single 12-pounder (76 mm) anti-aircraft gun. Two sets of torpedo tubes were removed, while one mast was removed and the foremast shortened to reduce topweight.

=== Royal Norwegian Navy service ===
On 9 April 1941, following completion of the refit, Bath transferred to the exiled Royal Norwegian Navy. As HNoMS Bath she began operation as part of the "Liverpool Escort Force" as a member of the 5th Escort Group early in June, escorting convoys between the United Kingdom and Gibraltar, but had a very brief subsequent career, being sunk by the German submarine U-204 on 19 August 1941, while escorting Convoy OG 71 bound for Gibraltar. She was hit in the engine room on the starboard side by two torpedoes and broke in two, sinking in three minutes. As she sank two of her depth charges exploded killing some of the crew in the water. Of her 128 crew, only 42 were rescued by HMS Hydrangea and HMS Wanderer but two of those subsequently died aboard Hydrangea. The death toll was compounded by the fact that two depth charges exploded when the vessel went down.

== Bibliography ==
- Edwards, Bernard (2009). The Cruel Sea Retold. South Yorkshire: Pen & Sword Military. ISBN 978-1-84415-863-8.
- Friedman, Norman (2009). British Destroyers: From Earliest Days to the Second World War. Barnsley, UK: Seaforth Publishing. ISBN 978-1-84832-049-9.
- Hague, Arnold (1988). The Towns: A history of the fifty destroyers transferred from the United States to Great Britain in 1940. Kendal, UK: World Ship Society. ISBN 0-905617-48-7.
