= USS Hopewell (DD-681) =

Fletcher-class destroyer

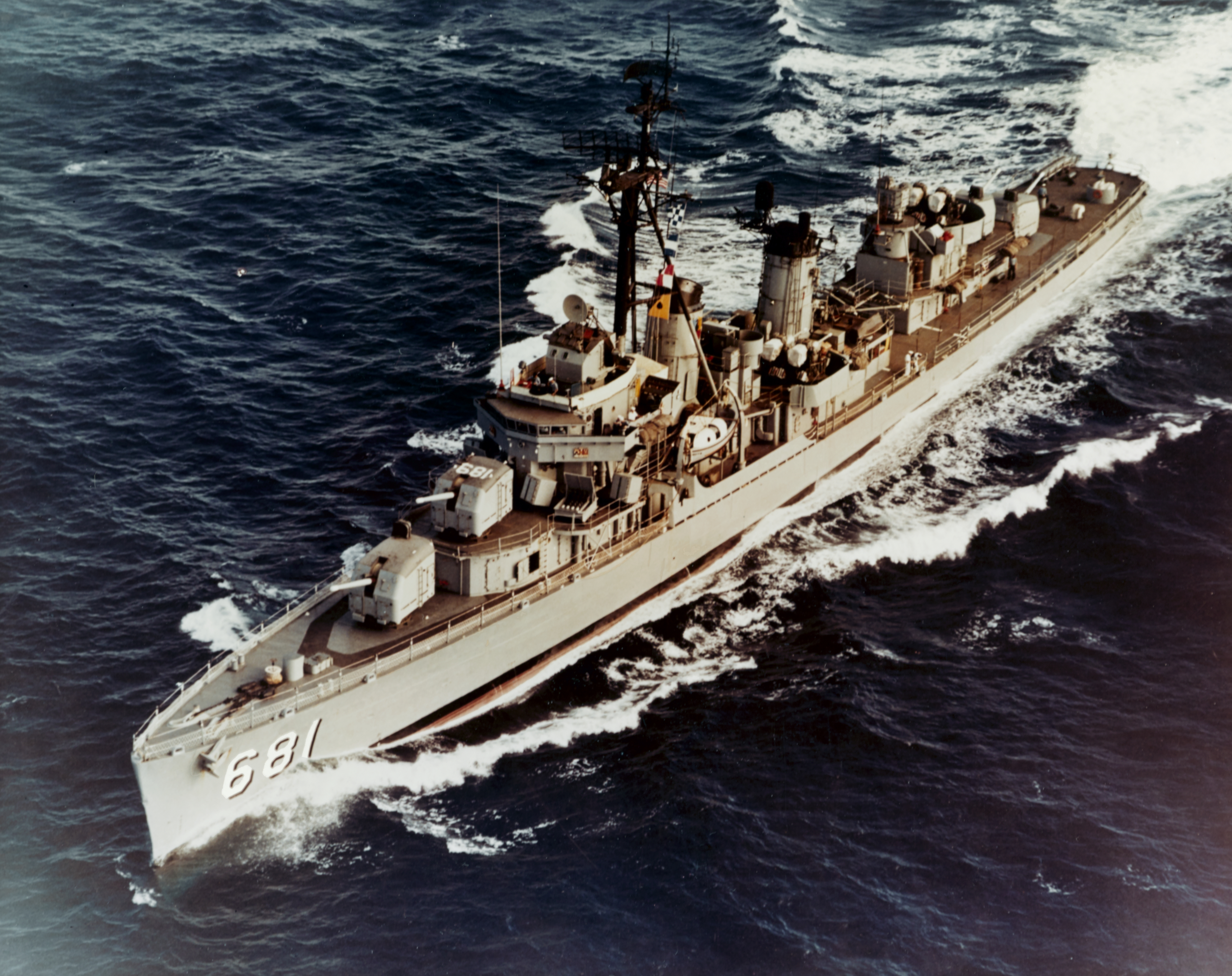
- USS Hopewell (DD-681) during a test firing

History

United States
- Name: Hopewell
- Namesake: Pollard Hopewell
- Builder: Bethlehem Shipbuilding, San Pedro, California
- Laid down: 29 October 1942
- Launched: 2 May 1943
- Commissioned: 30 September 1943
- Decommissioned: 2 January 1970
- Stricken: 2 January 1970
- Motto: Offense – Defense
- Fate: Sunk as target, 11 February 1972

General characteristics
- Class & type: Fletcher-class destroyer
- Displacement: 2,050 tons
- Length: 376 ft 6 in (114.76 m)
- Beam: 39 ft 8 in (12.09 m)
- Draft: 17 ft 9 in (5.41 m)
- Propulsion: 60,000 shp (45,000 kW); Geared turbines; 2 propellers
- Speed: 38 knots (70 km/h; 44 mph)
- Range: 6,500 nmi (12,000 km; 7,500 mi) at 15 kn (28 km/h; 17 mph)
- Complement: 319
- Armament: 5 × single Mk 12 5 in (127 mm)/38 guns; 5 × twin 40 mm (1.6 in) Bofors AA guns; 7 × single 20 mm (0.8 in) Oerlikon AA guns; 2 × quintuple 21 in (533 mm) torpedo tubes; 6 × single depth charge throwers; 2 × depth charge racks

USS Hopewell (DD-681) was a Fletcher-class destroyer in service the United States Navy from 1943 to 1947 and from 1951 to 1970. She was finally sunk as a target in 1972.

== History ==
Hopewell was named in honour of Pollard Hopewell of St. Mary's county, Maryland (USA). She was launched by Bethlehem Shipbuilding, San Pedro, California on 2 May 1943; sponsored by Mrs. R. A. Spruance, wife of Admiral Raymond A. Spruance; and commissioned at Terminal Island on 30 September 1943.

=== World War II ===
Hopewell conducted shakedown training in the San Diego area before sailing for Hawaii 13 January 1944. She got underway 23 January for the invasion of the Marshalls, as American amphibious task forces picked up momentum in their drive toward Japan. Steaming as a forward picket ship, Hopewell arrived off Kwajalein on 31 January and delivered gunfire support during the initial assault. That night she bombarded Roi and Namur Islands and 1 February moved to screening and patrol duties off the other islands of the group. With the success of the landings assured, Hopewell sailed to Pearl Harbor, arriving on 24 February.

The destroyer arrived at Purvis Bay, Florida Islands on 14 March to take part in the developing offensive on the northern coast of New Guinea. She carried out screening and patrol assignments, and contributed shore bombardment during the Aitape landings, part of the bold Hollandia operation. After Aitape, an unopposed operation carried out 22 April, Hopewell remained with 7th Fleet patrolling and screening. With three other destroyers she carried out a bombardment of Japanese positions on New Ireland on 29 May, and in June joined escort carrier Hoggatt Bay on antisubmarine patrol.

Hopewell's next operation was the invasion of Morotai, necessary as an air base for the Philippines campaign to come. She arrived 16 September, the day after the initial landing, to assume screening duties, and shot down an attacking Japanese plane that day. On 18 September, she supported an auxiliary landing on Morotai, and sailed 25 September with a convoy for Humboldt Bay.

The invasion of the Philippines began with the Leyte landings 20 October, and four days later Hopewell arrived with a reinforcement group. A damaged propeller kept her from taking part in the four-part Battle of Leyte Gulf, in which the Imperial Japanese Navy suffered defeat on 24–25 October. Next day she departed in the van of a convoy and shaped course for Humboldt Bay, where repairs could be effected. At the eastern entrance to the Gulf the convoy was attacked, and in the battle that followed Hopewell made concealing smoke and shot down two aircraft.

The ship sailed again 8 November for Leyte, and after two trips from Humboldt Bay and return with convoys, she joined the Mindoro invasion forces. After fighting off heavy air attacks en route, Hopewell arrived off the assault area 15 December and provided fire support as troops stormed ashore. As air attacks continued, the ship helped fight fires on LST-472 and assisted in shooting down other planes before sailing again for Leyte at noon.

With Mindoro in Allied hands, and air bases for the Luzon invasion under construction, Hopewell prepared for that operation, to be carried out initially at Lingayen Gulf. She sailed 4 January and fought off Japanese kamikaze attacks on the passage to Lingayen, for the landings 9 January joined the screen of an escort carrier group providing air cover. Hopewell joined in the amphibious assault on Corregidor 14 February, and while clearing obstructions from Mariveles Bay with gunfire engaged a large battery on "the rock". The destroyer laid smoke and moved in to help damaged YMS-48, and soon received four hits, putting her battery control station out of commission. Although suffering 17 casualties, Hopewell remained in Manila Bay until 18 February, when she sailed to Manus for repairs.

The ship next continued to San Francisco, arriving 17 March, and after further repairs sailed for Pearl Harbor 28 May 1945. Training operations in Hawaiian waters occupied her until 20 July, when she sailed for Eniwetok and Guam. The day of the Japanese surrender, Hopewell sailed from Guam with a refueling group supporting famed Task Force 38 which had done so much to bring victory. She operated in Japanese waters in support of the occupation until 21 October 1945, when she sailed for the United States via Pearl Harbor. Arriving Puget Sound Navy Yard 8 November, she later moved to San Diego, where she decommissioned 15 January 1947 and was placed in the Pacific Reserve Fleet.

=== Korean War ===
With the increased demands of the Korean War, Hopewell recommissioned 28 March 1951 at San Diego. Immediately following shakedown training she steamed westward to Korea 18 June, taking up screening duties with Task Force 77 as carrier based aircraft blasted Communist positions. The destroyer also bombarded Wonsan and served on the Formosa Patrol August–September 1951, returning to Mare Island Yard 5 February 1952.

Hopewell sailed for her second tour in Korea 11 August 1952 after shakedown and training exercises. During this period of stalemate in the land war, the Navy continued to operate against supply lines and strong points, and Hopewell screened the carriers and heavy ships of Task Force 77. Bombardment of Wonsan followed another period of Formosa Patrol, and in December the ship steamed to Formosa to help train Nationalist Chinese sailors. She returned briefly to Korea to screen battleship Missouri during bombardment operations late in January 1953, and sailed for the United States 3 March 1953.

After operating off the California coast for several months on antisubmarine training, Hopewell sailed again for the Far East 27 October 1953. She again took part in training exercises and patrol off Formosa, returning to San Diego 23 May 1954. As she began her fourth cruise, a new crisis between Communist China and Formosa developed, and in February Hopewell assisted in the evacuation of the Tachen Islands. Following this Cold War operation, the destroyer took part in fleet exercises in the western Pacific, returning to San Diego 22 May 1955.

The veteran ship spent the remainder of 1955 on exercises off the coast. On 11 November during an amphibious training operation, a single engine attack bomber crashed into Hopewell amidships, killing five and starting gasoline fires. Alert firefighters brought the flames under control and the ship returned to San Diego for lengthy repairs. The Mt 53 5"38 gun mount was destroyed by the crash and not replaced which distinguished her as the only Fletcher Class with only four 5"38 gun mounts.

Returning to active operations again 24 March 1956, when she sailed for the Far East, Hopewell resumed her regular pattern of cruises to Japan, Formosa, and Okinawa interspersed with training and readiness exercises off the West Coast of the United States. She operated with Korean and Nationalist Chinese ships on maneuvers in 1958 and 1959 and continued to act as an integral part of America fleet in the Pacific. On 12 November 1959 Hopewell returned to San Diego for extensive refitting and training.

=== Vietnam ===
Hopewell was repeatedly deployed from the West Coast to South Vietnam from 1960 through May 1969 in defense of the Republic of Vietnam. In February 1963 she rescued a crewman from a downed Douglas A-3B Skywarrior from the attack aircraft carrier Ticonderoga in the South China Sea. Hopewell deployed 5 August 1964 for the "Taiwan Patrol." The Gulf of Tonkin Incident occurred, and Hopewell was sent to the gunline off Vietnam to conduct fire missions. She returned to San Diego 6 February 1965. During the summer of 1965, Hopewell visited San Francisco, Puget Sound, and Hawaii as part of the Pacific Midshipman Training Squadron. Hopewell deployed a second time to Vietnam on 1 March 1966 and returned to San Diego in early August 1966. During that cruise she fired 2,276 rounds, destroyed 112 structures, and silenced a Viet Cong mortar attack upon ground forces. For the remainder of 1966, she acted as school ship in gunnery and ASW off the West Coast. She then went to the yards in Hunters Point in late 1966 and early 1967.

On 3 October 1967, the Hopewell was on her way from Sasebo, Japan to Yankee Station in the Gulf of Tonkin. At 1602, while alongside the USS Oriskany (CVA-34), she lost power to her steering motor and collided with Oriskany. There were no casualties, but damage to the ship required that she be detached to Subic Bay for repairs.

Hopewell deployed again to the Western Pacific in November 1968. While there, she was engaged in gunfire support missions off South Vietnam and in plane guard duties on Yankee Station. Accompanied by USS Frank Knox (DD-742), she made port calls in Australia on her was back to San Diego, visiting the ports of Townsville and Newcastle. She arrived back in San Diego on 7 Jun 1969. Her crew then began preparing the ship for decommissioning.

=== Fate ===
She was decommissioned 2 January 1970 and sunk as target for the test of a Walleye II missile on 11 February 1972. The wreck of Hopewell was located and dove on 12 February 2011 by the UB88 Project (Kendall Raine, John Walker & Scott Brooks-support diver).

Hopewell received nine battle stars for World War II service and four for Korean service.
