= USS Hopewell =

Two ships in the United States Navy have been named USS Hopewell.

- USS Hopewell (DD-181) was a Wickes-class destroyer launched in June 1918 and transferred to the Royal Navy in September 1940
- USS Hopewell (DD-681) was a Fletcher-class destroyer launched in May 1943
