= Western Correctional Institution =

Correctional institution in Cumberland, Maryland, US

Coordinates: 39°36′20″N 78°49′02″W

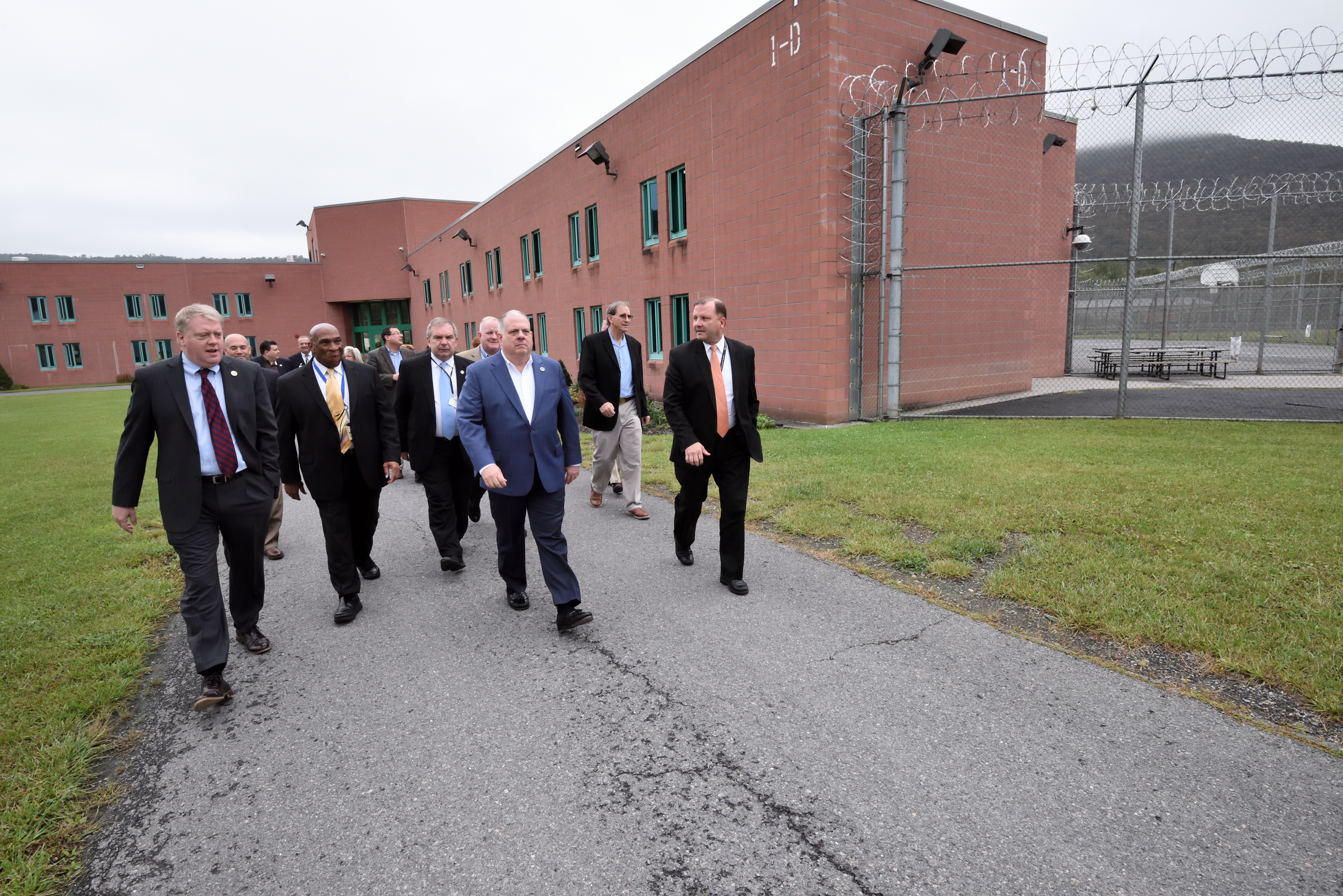
- Governor of Maryland Larry Hogan visiting the prison, 2017
- Interactive map of Western Correctional Institution
- Location: 13800 McMullen Hwy SW Cumberland, Maryland postal address
- Status: Maximum
- Capacity: 1793
- Opened: 1996
- Managed by: Maryland Department of Public Safety and Correctional Services

The Western Correctional Institution is a maximum security state prison for men located in Cresaptown census-designated place, unincorporated Allegany County, Maryland, near Cumberland. It opened in 1996 and has an official capacity of 1793.

Western Correctional Institution is close to two other correctional facilities: the high-tech "hyper max" North Branch Correctional Institution first opened as an extension of Western which, later was officially separated in 2003, and the Allegany County Detention Center. A third prison, the Federal Correctional Institution, Cumberland, is located in the same county.

== History ==
The grounds of the prison were formerly the location of a plant of the American Cellulose and Chemical Manufacturing Co. Ltd, now known as the Celanese corporation. The plant closed in 1983 and was later demolished to make way for the construction of the prison.

== Notable inmates ==
=== Current ===
- James Allen Kulbicki – Baltimore City police officer found guilty of murdering his mistress. Story turned into the 1996 TV movie Double Jeopardy.
- Michael Thompson, another Baltimore police officer found guilty of murder. He could have got the death penalty but is facing life in jail.
- Raymont Hopewell – serial killer, 1999–2005

=== Former ===
- Joe Metheny – serial killer – died of natural causes in 2017 at Western Correctional Institution.
