= Joe Metheny =

American serial killer (1955–2017)

Joseph Roy Metheny
- Metheny in 1997
- Born: Joseph Roy Metheny; March 2, 1955; Baltimore, Maryland, U.S.
- Died: August 5, 2017 (aged 62); Western Correctional Institution, Cumberland, Maryland, U.S.
- Convictions: Murder, kidnapping, rape
- Penalty: Death; commuted to life imprisonment without the possibility of parole

Details
- Victims: 2 established 13 claimed
- Span of crimes: 1976–1996
- Country: United States
- State: Maryland
- Date apprehended: December 15, 1996

Joseph Roy Metheny (March 2, 1955 – August 5, 2017) was an American murderer and rapist, and suspected serial killer from the Baltimore, Maryland area. While he claimed to have killed 13 people, sufficient evidence was only found to convict him of two murders.

== Early life ==
Metheny's attorneys said his mother neglected her six children while she worked double shifts outside the home, that his father was an alcoholic who was killed in a car accident when Metheny was six, and that he suffered from depression. Metheny said that his parents often sent him to live with other families in "foster-like" arrangements. His mother said she had to work multiple jobs and they were financially poor, but she had provided her children with a normal family life, and the children had never gone hungry or been put into homes of other families as Metheny had claimed. She said that Metheny was an above-average student, always polite, and not mean as a child. She said "he was smart and had a good childhood. If he was neglected, it was his own fault. It was a pretty good home."

Metheny joined the United States Army in 1973. His mother said that he had served in Germany, although he claimed that he had served in Vietnam and had become addicted to heroin while in an artillery unit there. His mother said that she had no recollection of him serving in Vietnam, and the circumstances of his service were reported as unverified in press reports. American involvement in Vietnam had ended by that time.

Metheny seldom contacted his mother after he joined the Army. She said, "He just kept drifting further and further away. I think the worst thing that ever happened to him was drugs. It's a sad, sad story."

== Murders and confessions ==
Metheny was given the ironic nickname "Tiny" in the 1990s, as he was 6 ft 1 in (185 cm) and very large. He spent much of his time drinking in bars and lived with groups of homeless men in makeshift camps in South Baltimore; nearly all of his money was spent on crack cocaine, heroin, and liquor. However, he held a steady job as a forklift driver and was described as intelligent, well-spoken, and very well-mannered and as a "practical joker" who would brighten people's day and make them laugh.

Metheny murdered Cathy Ann Magaziner in 1994, and buried her body in a shallow grave on the site of the factory where he worked. He later said that he had strangled her and that he dug up her skeleton six months later, put her head in a box, and threw it in the trash.

Metheny was tried for murder in a different case in 1995 for allegedly killing two homeless men, Randall Brewer and Randy Piker, with an axe at a "tent city" under Baltimore's Hanover Street Bridge. Rival groups of homeless men were involved in mutual disputes and one of them, Larry Amos, was convicted of stealing the murder weapon and later using it to kill Everett Dowell, another homeless man. Brewer's and Piker's bodies were discovered on August 2, 1995, the same day that Dowell was murdered. Amos was arrested, accused of first-degree murder and pleaded guilty to the lesser charge of manslaughter; he was released after serving one year and nine months of an eight-year sentence. A jury concluded in July 1996 there was insufficient evidence to convict Metheny of murdering Brewer and Piker, but Metheny later said that he had committed those murders.

Metheny killed Kimberly Lynn Spicer in mid-November 1996 by stabbing her with a knife. He kidnapped Rita Kemper on December 8, 1996, and attempted to rape her. According to prosecutors, he shared drugs with Kemper in the trailer where he was living at the pallet factory site. She refused to have sex with him and ran out of the trailer, so he chased her, beat her, dragged her back into the trailer, and then pulled down her pants and attempted to rape her. Kemper said he had attempted to murder her, saying: "I'm going to kill you and bury you in the woods with the other girls." She escaped through a window of the trailer and fled to police officers in the area.

Metheny then asked a friend to help him bury the body of Spicer which he had been hiding at the factory site since killing her a month earlier. The friend reported it to the police on December 15, 1996, and Metheny was arrested and charged with her murder the same day. The owner of the business was arrested with Metheny as they left a Christmas party and was charged as an accessory after the fact for allegedly disposing of evidence. Metheny began confessing to other murders, as well as that of Spicer. He led police to the shallow grave where he had reburied Magaziner's decapitated remains. Much of the skull was missing, but the police were able to identify Magaziner from dental records.

Police said that he had chosen young white sex workers who were addicted to heroin and cocaine. The killings also involved brutal sexual assaults. He was indicted for killing Toni Lynn Ingrassia, age 28, but those charges were later dropped for lack of evidence.

The reliability of Metheny's testimony is questionable and the true number of his victims has never been substantiated. He claimed to have killed three prostitutes along Washington Boulevard in Baltimore although no evidence of those crimes apart from than his confession was found. He said that he had thrown bodies in the Patapsco River and they had never been found. The Baltimore Sun reported in 1997 that many of his claims about how many people he had killed were questionable, although he said that he had killed up to 10 people. Metheny also claimed during his testimony that he stored his victims' flesh in a freezer and served it to people at a BBQ stand, though this was also unverified and unsupported by evidence. His attorney said that he was remorseful and that drugs and alcohol had changed his personality and made him violent.

== Sentencing ==
He was tried in 1997 in the Kemper case and given a sentence of 50 years for kidnapping and attempted sexual assault. He was acquitted of attempting to murder her. He was sentenced to death in 1998 for the murder of Spicer. At his sentencing hearing, he said that he committed murders because he "enjoyed it", he "got a rush out of it, got a high out of it" and "had no real excuse why other than I like to do it".

In August 1998, he pleaded guilty to murdering and robbing Magaziner, and prosecutors sought the death penalty in that case, as well. He received a sentence of life in prison in that case. His death sentence was overturned in 2001, and the sentence for the murder of Spicer was reduced to life without parole. The rationale for the death penalty was that the murder had been committed in committing a robbery, but the evidence indicated that robbery was not his motivation.

== Death ==
Metheny was found dead in his prison cell at the Western Correctional Institution in Cumberland, Maryland, on August 5, 2017, at the age of 62.

== See also ==
- List of serial killers in the United States
- List of serial killers by number of victims
