= Battle of Cowan's Ford =

Battle of the American Revolutionary War

Coordinates: 35.4283°N 80.9519°W

- Part of the American Revolutionary War
Date	February 1, 1781
Location	Lincoln and Mecklenburg County, North Carolina
Result	British victory

Belligerents
Great Britain	United States

Commanders and leaders
(Kingdom of Great Britain) Lord Cornwallis (Kingdom of Great Britain) Banastre Tarleton	(United States) William Davidson †

Strength
2,440	800

Casualties and losses
4 killed 36 wounded	4 killed Wounded unknown 3 captured

The Battle of Cowan's Ford took place in the Southern Theater of Cornwallis's 1780–1782 Campaign during the American Revolutionary War. It was fought on February 1, 1781, at Cowan's Ford on the Catawba River in northwestern Mecklenburg County, North Carolina, between a force of about 2,400 British and about 800 Whig (Patriot) militia who were attempting to slow the British advance across the river. The American general William Lee Davidson was killed in this battle.

== Background ==
After the British victory at the Battle of Camden, General Nathanael Greene replaced Horatio Gates as Commander of the Southern Department of the Continental Army. Rather than attempt to confront the much larger and better equipped British Army under Cornwallis directly, Greene attempted to wear down his opponents by engaging the British in a series of small battles. Of these battles, Greene stated of the Continental Army: "We fight, get beat, rise, and fight again."

Following the Battle of Cowpens, Cornwallis was determined on destroying Greene's forces. Cornwallis ordered his men to burn their supplies and pursued Greene in the "Race to the Dan" (The Dan River which flows through Southern Virginia and Northern North Carolina).

During the preceding weeks, Cornwallis's army had swung to the left and approached the swollen waters of the Catawba in late January. For three days, the British forces camped at Ramsour's Mill (near present-day Lincolnton), where they were joined by the remains of Banastre Tarleton forces.

On January 28, 1781, General Daniel Morgan reported to General Nathanael Greene from his camp in Sherrills Ford that his forces had observed the British army moving towards the Catawba River. Morgan reported that he was attempting to collect the militia and delay Cornwallis's forces from crossing the river. To this end, Morgan ordered General William Lee Davidson with 500 militia (two hundred and fifty of which were without flints for their muskets) to Beatties Ford.

Cornwallis marched his forces eastward toward the river to Jacob Forney's, where they camped for another three days after he had determined that the Catawba river at Beatties Ford was impassable because of the raging current.

== Battle ==
On January 31, Cornwallis began to move his army despite the heavy rain fearing any further delay would cause him to lose his chance of destroying Greene's army. Some six weeks after the engagement, Cornwallis wrote that he had ordered a detachment under Lieutenant Colonel Webster to "make every possible demonstration by cannonading and otherwise, of an intention to force a passage" at Beatties Ford while he would march down the river to Cowan's Ford.

General Greene arrived and ordered General Davidson, who had placed his men at the various fords along the eastern bank, to slow the British Army's crossing of the Catawba River. Greene and Morgan then left to accompany the bulk of their forces towards Salisbury, North Carolina.

Davidson dispatched a company of cavalry and infantry southward four miles to Cowan's Ford. The cavalry was to see that the British did not make a surprise crossing under cover of darkness. Toward nightfall Davidson joined the detachment at Cowan's Ford. Davidson evidently feared that Tarleton's troops might slip across the river in the darkness and, getting behind him, they could attack him as the British infantry began its crossing. He therefore set up camp a half mile from the river, with pickets watching Cowan's Ford from the water's edge.

Near daybreak, after a difficult march in which the British lost some of their cannon, Cornwallis's army reached Cowan's Ford. Cowan's Ford was actually two fords; one, the horse ford, though shallower than the other, was longer, because it crossed the stream at an angle; the other, called the wagon ford, went straight across the river but was much deeper. With very little hesitation, the British began crossing the swollen stream straight across along the wagon ford. Soon the horses were over their heads in the raging torrent.

Davidson's forces immediately began to confront the Redcoats. The militiamen were picking off many British soldiers as they struggled in the water to reach the far bank. After the first elements reached the bank and formed a firing line, they began to fire a volley at the now retreating militia. Shortly after arriving on the scene, Davidson was struck from his horse by a rifle ball through the heart. Oral tradition has it that a local Tory guide fired the fatal shot.

Late that evening Davidson's body was found, stripped and raindrenched. His wallet of papers, presumed taken by a British soldier, was discovered in the Public Records Office in London, in 1951. It was returned to the United States in 2001. General Davidson is buried at Hopewell Presbyterian Church in Mecklenburg county, NC.

== Order of Battle ==
=== Patriots ===
The Patriots were commanded by Brigadier General (Pro Tempore) William Lee Davidson, who was killed in action. Patriot units included the following:

- Salisbury District Brigade of the North Carolina militia detachment led by Brigadier General (Pro Tempore) William Lee Davidson, with the following known units:
- Mecklenburg County Regiment of the North Carolina militia detachment led by Lt. Col. William Polk, with ten (10) known companies, led by:
  - Capt. William Alexander
  - Capt. William Cole (from Randolph County)
  - Capt. Joseph Graham
  - Capt. Conrad Hise
  - Capt. James Huggins
  - Capt. James Ligert
  - Capt. Samuel Martin
  - Capt. James Maxwell
  - Capt. Charles Polk
  - Capt. Thomas Ray
- Rowan County Regiment of the North Carolina militia detachment led by Maj. James Hall (killed), with thirteen known companies, led by:
  - Capt. Abel Armstrong
  - Capt. Daniel Bryson
  - Capt. David Caldwell
  - Capt. Thomas Cowan
  - Capt. James Crawford (mortally wounded)
  - Capt. Thomas Davidson
  - Capt. John Dickey
  - Capt. Richard Graham
  - Capt. Thomas Morrison
  - Capt. Jacob Nichols
  - Capt. Samuel Reid
  - Capt. Richard Simmons
  - Capt. William Wilson
- Lincoln County Regiment of the North Carolina militia detachment led by Maj. David Wilson, with six known companies, led by:
  - Capt. John Baldridge
  - Capt. Peter Forney
  - Capt. Thomas Lofton
  - Capt. James Lytle
  - Capt. John Weir
  - Capt. John Work]
- Surry County Regiment of the North Carolina militia detachment of two known companies, led by:
  - Capt. Arthur Scott
  - Capt. John Morgan
- Burke County Regiment of the North Carolina militia detachment of one (known company, led by:
  - Capt. Alexander Irvin
- Johnston County Regiment (New Bern District Brigade) of the North Carolina militia detachment of one known company, led by:
  - Capt. Thomas Culler
- Montgomery County Regiment of the North Carolina militia detachment led by Col. William Lofton, with three known companies, led by:
  - Capt. John Hill (Randolph County)
  - Capt. Jonathan Potts (Mecklenburg County)
  - Capt. William Twitty (Rutherford County)
- Orange County Regiment of the North Carolina militia detachment led by Lt. Col. Thomas Farmer and Maj. Archibald Murphy, with five known companies, led by:
  - Capt. William Greenwood
  - Capt. William Jamieson
  - Capt. Stephen Merritt (Granville County)
  - Capt. Shadrack Parish (Granville County)
  - Capt. William Nichols
- Caswell County Regiment (Hillsborough District Brigade) of the North Carolina militia detachment of three known companies, led by:
  - Capt. Spillsby Coleman
  - Capt. F. Lawson
  - Capt. Robert Park
- Wake County Regiment (Hillsborough District Brigade) of the North Carolina militia detachment of one known company, led by:
  - Capt. Etheldred Jones

=== British and loyalists ===
The British forces were commanded by Lt. General Charles, Lord Cornwallis. The following units were under his command:

- Brigade of Guards, led by Brig. Gen. Charles O'Hara, with 690 men in the following known units:
- 1st Guards Battalion, led by Col. Chapple Norton, with three companies, led by:
  - Lt. Col. Augustus Maitland - 1st Company
  - Lt. Col. Charles Horneck - 2nd Company
  - Lt. Col. Lowther Pennington - Grenadier Company
- 2nd Guards Battalion, led by Col. James Stewart, with two known companies, led by:
  - Lt. Col. Robert Lovelace - 3rd Company
  - Lt. Col. Thomas Swanton - 4th Company
- Light Infantry, led by Col. Francis Hall, with three known companies, led by:
  - Lt. Col. Francis Hall - 3rd Scots Guards
  - Capt. William Maynard - Coldstream Guards
  - Lt. Col. Francis Dundas - 1st Guards
- 23rd Regiment of Foot (Royal Welsh Fusiliers), with 279 men in two known companies, led by:
  - Capt. Forbes Champagne
  - Capt. Thomas Peter
- Hesse-Kassel Musketeer Regiment von Bose, led by Maj. Chris du Buy, with 345 men in four known companies, led by:
  - Capt. Alexander Wilmonsky
  - Capt. Moritz von Stein
  - Capt. Johann Eichenbrodt
  - Capt. Herman Christian Rall
- British Legion, led by Unknown, with 180 men in two known companies, led by:
  - Capt. David Ogilvie
  - Capt. David Kinlock
- Prince of Wales American Volunteers detachment of 10 men led by Ensign Patrick Garrett
  - Capt. Richard Hovenden
  - Capt. Thomas Sanford
  - Capt. Francis Gildart
