= Hopewell School =

Hopewell School may refer to:

== United States ==
- Hopewell District No. 45 School, Hopewell, Arkansas
- Hopewell School, Glastonbury, Connecticut
- The Hopewell School, a former high school in Dubach, Louisiana
- Hopewell School (Taunton, Massachusetts)
- Several schools in Hopewell, Covington County, Mississippi
  - New Hopewell School (1885–1950)
  - Hopewell Colored Separate School District (opened in 1922)
  - Hopewell Elementary School, a former Rosenwald School (opened in the 1920s)
- Hopewell School, Neshoba County School District, Mississippi
- Hopewell Junior High School and Hopewell Elementary School, Hopewell Area School District, Aliquippa, Pennsylvania
- Hopewell Rosenwald School, Clarks Hill, South Carolina
- Hopewell School (Cedar Creek, Texas), a Rosenwald school
- Hopewell School (historical), a placename in Hampshire County, West Virginia

== Other places ==
- Hopewell Avenue Public School in Ottawa, Ontario, Canada
- Hopewell School, a school in the London Borough of Barking and Dagenham, England

== See also ==
- Hopewell High School (disambiguation)
