= Hopewell High School =

Hopewell High School may refer to:

== Jamaica ==
- Hopewell High School, Jamaica

== United States ==
- The Hopewell School, a former high school in Dubach, Louisiana
- Hopewell High School (North Carolina), in Charlotte, North Carolina
- Hopewell High School (Pennsylvania), in Aliquippa, Pennsylvania
- Hopewell High School (Virginia), in Hopewell, Virginia
  - Hopewell High School Complex, the former high school campus in Hopewell

== See also ==
- Hopewell School (disambiguation)
