= Hopewell Presbyterian Church (Oxford, Mississippi) =

Historic church in Mississippi, United States

- U.S. National Register of Historic Places
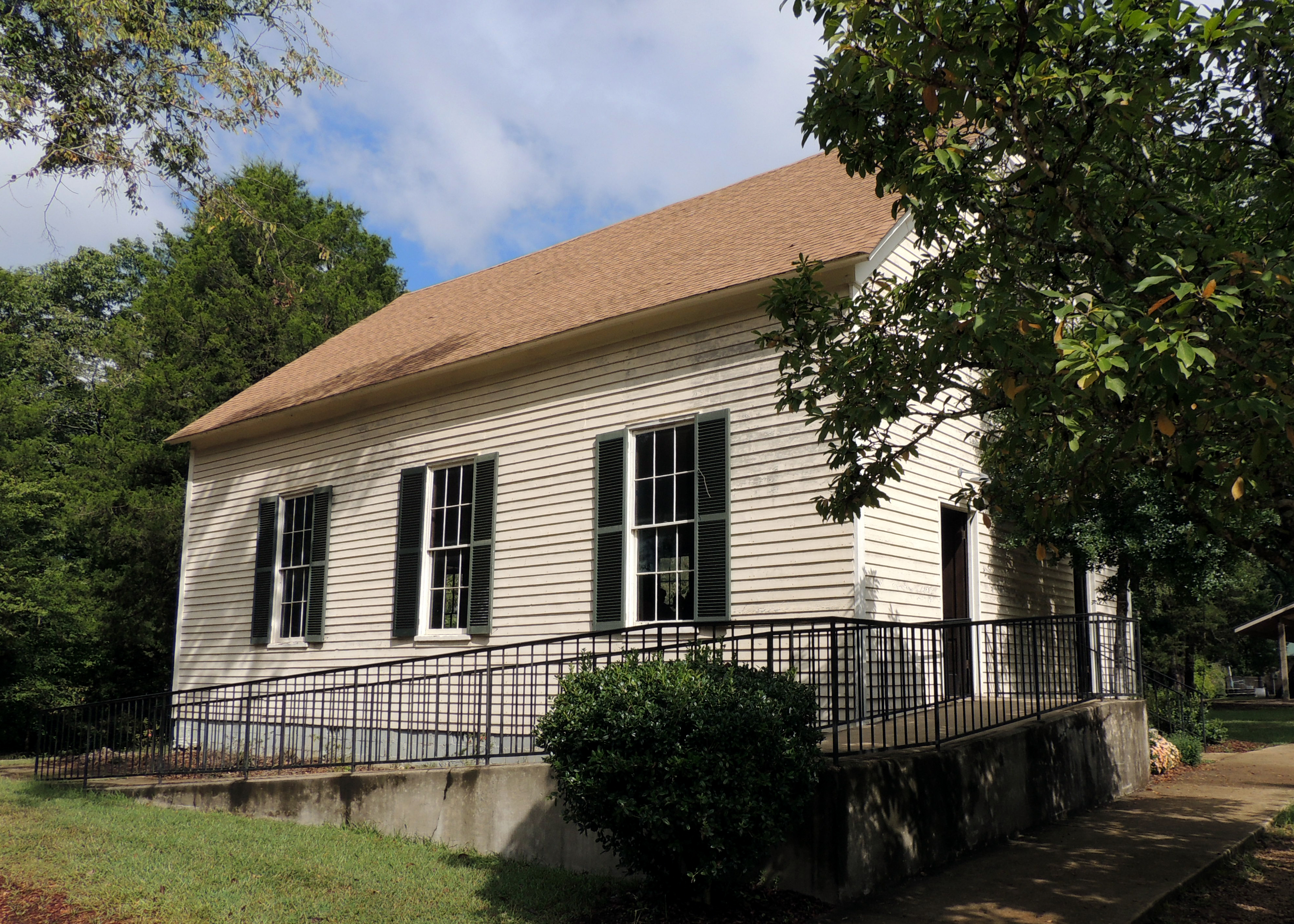
- The church in 2013

- Location within Mississippi Location within the United States
- Nearest city: Oxford, Mississippi
- Coordinates: 34°23′37″N 89°24′41″W
- Area: less than one acre
- Built: 1849
- Architectural style: Mid 19th Century Revival
- NRHP reference No.: 99000837
- Added to NRHP: July 15, 1999

Hopewell Presbyterian Church is a historic Presbyterian church building in Oxford, Mississippi. The church was built around 1849, and replaced a log building that had burned down that year. The Hopewell Church was dissolved in 1981 and is now part of the grounds of Camp Hopewell, which was established in 1951. The building was added to the National Register of Historic Places in 1999, due to the retaining of its original framing, weatherboard, windows, and doors.
