= Hopewell (Union Bridge, Maryland) =

Historic house in Maryland, United States

- U.S. National Register of Historic Places
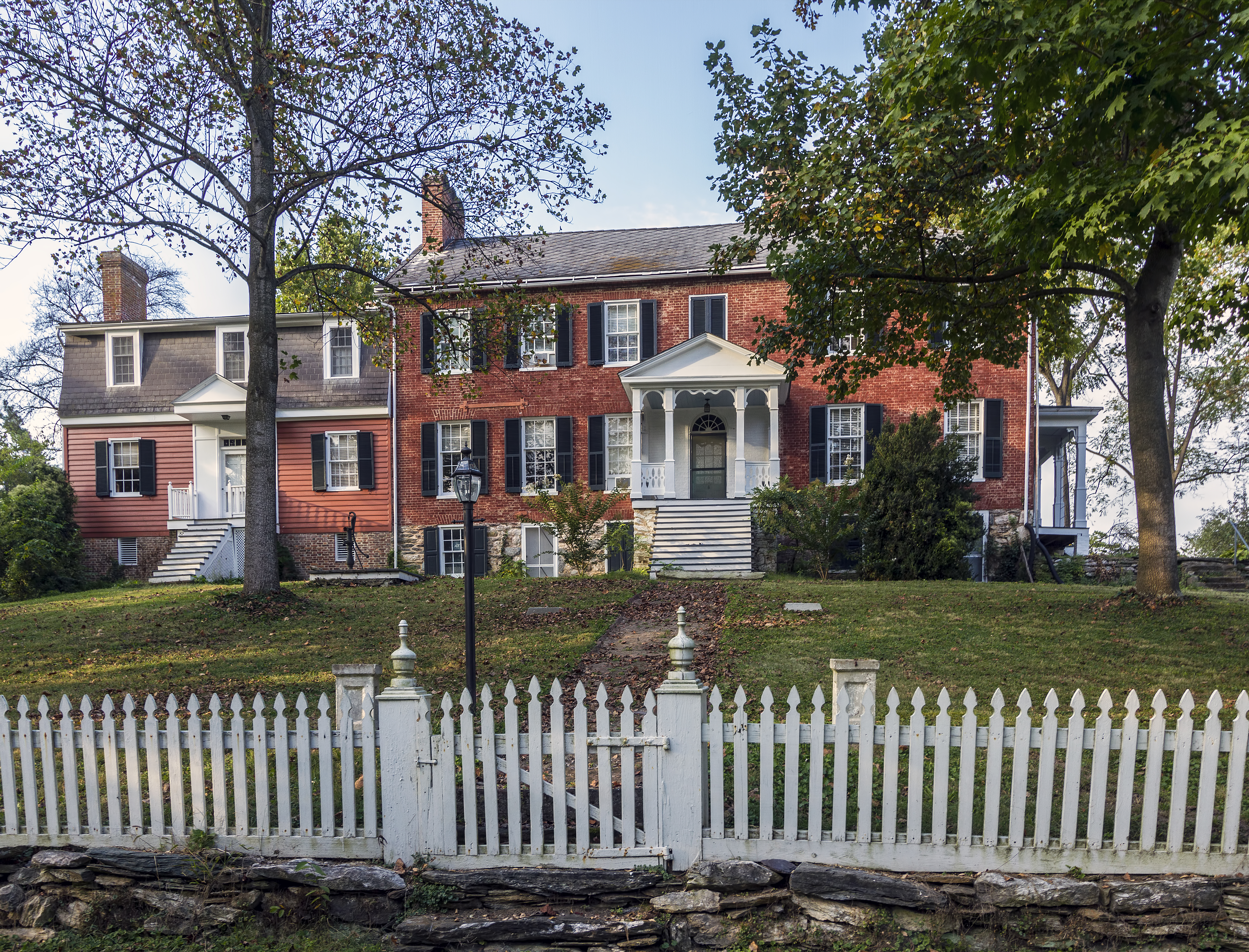
- Main house

- Location within Maryland Location within the United States
- Location: 14122 Pearre Road, Union Bridge, Maryland
- Coordinates: 39°31′31.9″N 77°10′12.85″W
- Area: 257.3 acres (104.1 ha)
- Built by: Clemson, James; Pearre, Oliver
- NRHP reference No.: 80001803
- Added to NRHP: December 8, 1980

Hopewell is a set of historic homes and farm complexes located at Union Bridge, Carroll County, Maryland, United States. It consists of four related groupings of 19th century farm buildings. The Hopewell complex consists of two historic farms: Hopewell and the smaller F.R. Shriner (Sam's Creek) Farm.

Hopewell's two-story main house dates from 1818. It has the distinction of having the first interior bathroom installed in Frederick County outside the City of Frederick. The main farm also contains a stone dairy, a frame privy, a frame carriage house, a frame workshop, a brick smokehouse, a brick bake oven, an ice house, and a frame Pennsylvania barn. There are two tenant complexes associated with Hopewell.

The F.R. Shriner Farm lies in Carroll County and consists of a brick two-story house on a raised coursed marble foundation, two smokehouses, an outhouse, a Pennsylvania barn, two corrugated iron silos, a double corncrib-wagon shed, two modern feed/storage buildings, a chicken coop, garage, work shed, piggery, and tractor shed.

Hopewell was listed on the National Register of Historic Places in 1980.

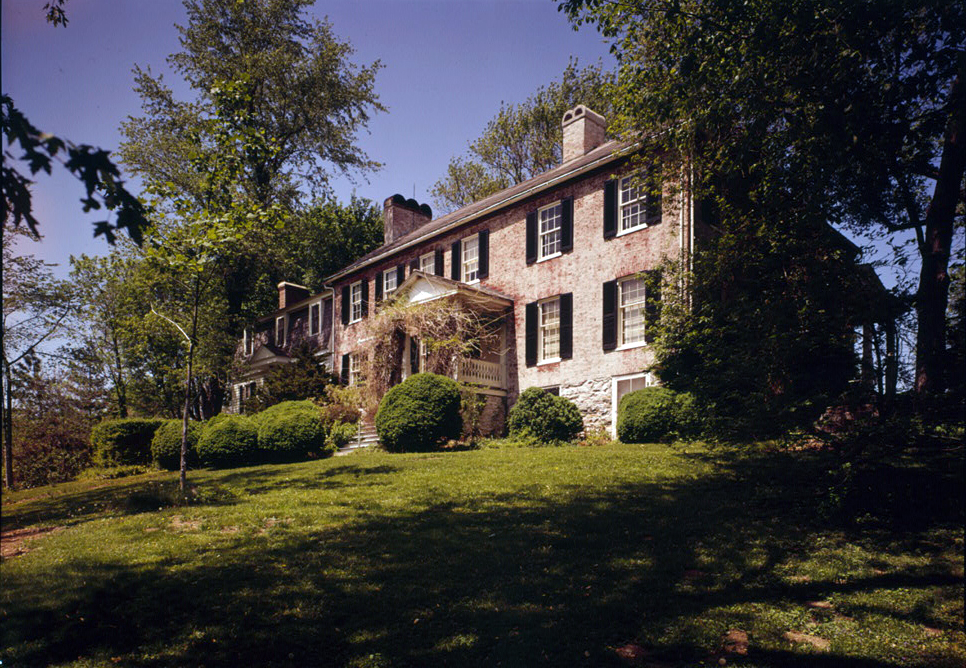
Main house in 1977

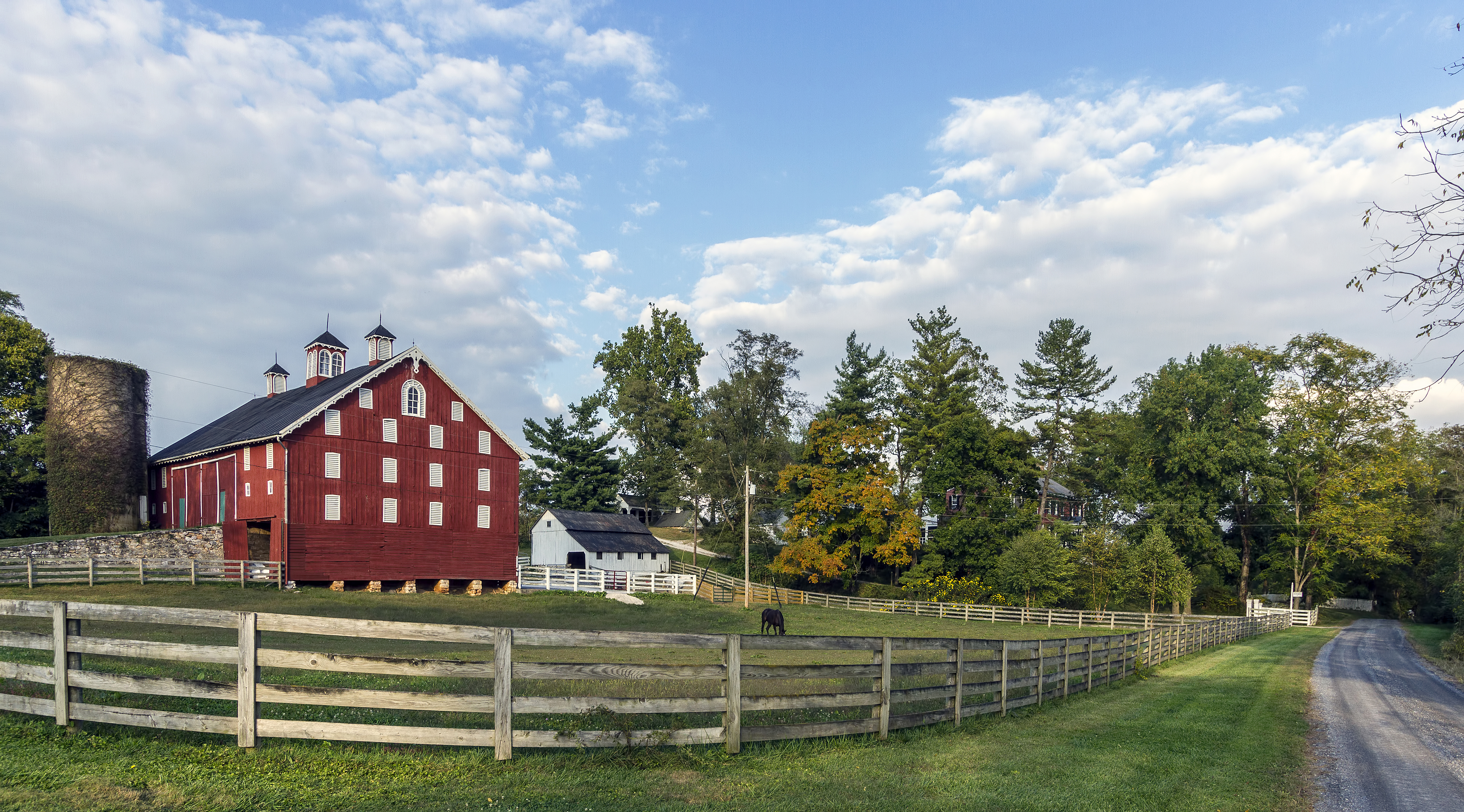
Barn
