= Hopewell, Saint Ann =

Settlement in Saint Ann, Jamaica

Coordinates: 18°27′N 77°24′W

Hopewell is a settlement in Saint Ann Parish, Jamaica.
