= Hopewell Gardens, Florida =

- Unincorporated community
- Location within Florida Location within the United States
- Coordinates: 27°58′47″N 82°07′43″W
- Country: United States
- State: Florida
- County: Hillsborough
- Elevation: 141 ft (43 m)
- Time zone: UTC-5 (Eastern (EST))
  - Summer (DST): UTC-4 (EDT)
- GNIS feature ID: 2483559

Hopewell Gardens is an unincorporated community in Hillsborough County, Florida, United States. It lies at an elevation of 141 feet (43 m) above sea level.

Hopewell Gardens is located along Florida State Road 39 north of the community of Hopewell and south of Plant City.
