= Hopewell, Manchester =

Human settlement in Jamaica

Coordinates: 17°56′N 77°26′W

Hopewell is a settlement in Manchester Parish, Jamaica.
