= Jacob Hopewell =

Jacob Hopewell (1831–1875) was an American inventor and noted eccentric. He is best known for his ingenious mechanical innovations and specifically for his claim that he had invented a machine that could be used to communicate with the dead via the transference of image. As this machine no longer exists, and no patent ever filed, its existence is still debated amongst folklorists, spiritualists, and scholars.

== Early life ==
Hopewell was born in 1831, and beyond that date most information regarding his early life is speculative at best. Some scholars, notably Arthur McCallister, describe him as a lonely child without siblings; others believe him to have been the eldest of as many as seven brothers and sisters. It is however certain that by 1850 he was the only remaining Hopewell child. The profession of his father prior to the 1840s is unknown. However, based on several letters and daguerreotypes it is relatively certain that his father, Richard D. Hopewell, was excited by the prospect of photography—so much so that he became a traveling photographer who circulated primarily through New York and New Jersey taking portraits in the towns he visited. While Jacob Hopewell's adolescence is shrouded in uncertainty, it can be sure that he attended the Great Exhibition of 1851 in London. It was there that he saw Frederick Bakewell's demonstration of the facsimile machine (an early precursor to the modern fax machine). In a letter dated November 15, 1851, Hopewell writes to his fiancé, Margaret Beecher, about some of what he saw at the exhibition:

Of all the wonders I have seen, not the least is Mr. Bakewell's facsimile machine. I find myself marveling at the ingenuity required to harness the powers of clockwork so as to recreate something without need of the hand of man.

This fragment is all that is known of Hopewell's impressions of the device.

The following year, Hopewell married Margaret Beecher and in 1853 they had their first child, a boy named Richard. It is certain they had other children, among them a daughter named Margaret, often referred to as Maggie. None of these others lived to adulthood and thus information is rather hazy. It can be assumed that by the birth of Richard, the Hopewells had established themselves in the Catskill region of New York State. Jacob did a variety of work in and around his local community. He repaired clocks, watches and even early cameras.

== The Hopewell Machine ==
The American Civil War officially broke out in 1861. It seems Hopewell was content to tinker at his home and remain separate from the war effort. That year, Margaret died in childbirth. The baby, named Margaret after its deceased mother, lived. It is thought by some that the trauma of this event is what caused him to withdraw from the world and reacquaint himself with the facsimile machine; this claim is supported by the hiring of a young local girl, also named Margaret, to care for Maggie. In 1863 Richard married Margaret before going off to enlist. At this time Jacob became obsessed with finding a way to show his dead wife a picture of their baby girl. McCallister cites a journal entry of Richard's in support of this claim:

I was much saddened by my father's absence at my recent wedding to Margaret.

His body was there to be sure but his mind elsewhere, no doubt considering alterations for his facsimile device. The only endeavor he can bear to sit with for more than an instant.

This is the last document known to have been written in Richard's own hand, as he died in battle soon after. It is clear from a very involved correspondence between Margaret and her mother that any final traces of the man that was Jacob disappeared completely after the death of his son. He was totally and completely obsessed with modifying a facsimile machine so as to be able to send images of his daughter Maggie and grandson, Richard—born the day his father was killed in battle—to the dead Margaret and Richard. No one knows exactly what Jacob Hopewell's device looked like. In fact, its material reality is still widely contested by a number of scholars today (a theory first proposed by Michael Winterbarton in 1996). Whether physically real or not, the idea of the machine consumed Jacob until the day he died.

== Death ==
Like most of his life, the events of Hopewell's death are widely contested. Lightning struck the barn he had been working in (this is recorded as fact by multiple neighbors). As a direct result, the barn burned to the ground leaving only rubble. The more romantic Hopewell scholars believe the heartbreak of seeing his life's work burn to the ground killed him. Some say he was in the barn when it was struck (the former group believe he was outside relieving himself due to a mild bladder infection). There are still others who believe he ran away and died five years later unknown and penniless in a Massachusetts shipping town. There is some conjecture that Hopewell committed suicide that night; he realized that only the charge of a blast of lightning could make his machine work and used his expertise to summon it with a special lightning rod (which he is known to have invented but never patented). These scholars say he knew the lightning was coming, knew it would make the machine work and knew a fire would probably ensue and kill him.

== Hopewell's "Relic" ==
In December 1943 Jacob Hopewell III was up in his attic packing away some of his son's belongings, Richard Hopewell IV, who had recently died of an infected battle wound. According to Jacob III, as he was finding a place for his son's belongings he knocked over an old chest that held all the personal documents of Jacob Hopewell. It is from these documents that all known information about Hopewell stems. According to Jacob III, he found not only photographs and documents, but a small, charred wooden mechanism enclosed in an envelope with a note from Margaret Hopewell (Richard Hopewell I's wife). This note explained that it was the only salvaged piece of Jacob Hopewell's device that could be found. The Hopewell family was the subject of much mockery regarding Jacob I's contraption. In a moment of despair, Jacob III brought the remaining piece of the machine downstairs and placed it in a birdhouse (Jacob III was a noted birdhouse builder although some claimed they were actually houses for his family spirits). For the next year (until he died) Jacob III placed a photograph from every family function he could find, probably in hopes that somehow the power of the machine would exist in the remaining object and that his dead son would be able to see all he had missed. This practice was met with further ridicule within the larger community. However, years later, when the birdhouse was rediscovered, photographs from multiple families were found inside, implying that others in the community, made desperate by the loss of their loved ones, were willing to suspend disbelief in the hope of being able to communicate with the dead. In a letter written just before his death, Jacob III stated explicitly that:

Regardless of the belief of subsequent generations, on no account are any of the images to be removed from the impromptu reliquary. For the device to function they must remain together as a set in perpetuity. While no images are to be removed under any circumstances, others should be allowed to add to them, provided only that they believe in the powers of the device.

Due to the words of Jacob III, today when scholars write of Hopewell's relic they mean not only the small wooden component of the original mechanism, but also all of the accompanying photographs. Since 1945, the location of Hopewell's relic has remained unknown. Some reports of the relic's recent discovery in New York's Hudson Valley are currently under investigation.
