= Hopewell, Jefferson County, Alabama =

Unincorporated community in Alabama, United States

- Unincorporated community
- Location within Alabama Location within the United States
- Coordinates: 33°21′38″N 86°56′19″W
- Country: United States
- State: Alabama
- County: Jefferson
- Elevation: 528 ft (161 m)
- Time zone: UTC-6 (Central (CST))
  - Summer (DST): UTC-5 (CDT)
- Area codes: 205, 659
- GNIS feature ID: 120354

Hopewell is an unincorporated community in Jefferson County, Alabama, United States. It now lies mostly within the corporate limits of the city of Bessemer. The historic Sadler Cemetery lies nearby and contains the graves of many pioneer settlers of western Jefferson County.
