= Hopewell Center, Pennsylvania =

Unincorporated community in Pennsylvania, U.S.

Coordinates: 39°47′51″N 76°30′27″W

Hopewell Center is an unincorporated community in York County, Pennsylvania, United States. It lies at an elevation of 689 feet (210 m).
