= Hopewell, KwaZulu-Natal =

Hopewell
- Location within KwaZulu-Natal Location within South Africa
- Coordinates: 29°47′S 30°24′E
- Country: South Africa
- Province: KwaZulu-Natal
- District: uMgungundlovu
- Municipality: Richmond

Area
  - Total: 3.31 km^{2} (1.28 sq mi)
- Elevation: 740 m (2,430 ft)

Population (2011)
  - Total: 11,119
  - Density: 3,360/km^{2} (8,700/sq mi)

Racial makeup (2011)
  - Black African: 99.5%
  - Coloured: 0.3%
  - White: 0.2%

First languages (2011)
  - Zulu: 93.3%
  - Xhosa: 1.7%
  - English: 1.3%
  - S. Ndebele: 1.3%
  - Other: 2.3%
- Time zone: UTC+2 (SAST)
- Postal code (street): 3760
- PO box: 3705

Hopewell is a village in KwaZulu-Natal, South Africa. It is situated 20 km south of Pietermaritzburg and 10 km east of Richmond.
