= Hopewell, Clarendon =

Settlement in Clarendon Parish, Jamaica

Coordinates: 17°56′N 77°18′W

Hopewell is a settlement in Clarendon Parish, Jamaica.
