= Hopewell District No. 45 School =

- U.S. National Register of Historic Places
- Location within Arkansas Location within the United States
- Nearest city: Hopewell, White County, Arkansas
- Coordinates: 35°20′12″N 91°36′5″W
- Area: less than one acre
- Built by: Works Progress Administration
- Architectural style: WPA Craftsman architecture
- MPS: White County MPS
- NRHP reference No.: 91001283
- Added to NRHP: July 13, 1992

The Hopewell District No. 45 School was a historic former school building in rural White County, Arkansas. It was located northwest of Bald Knob on Arkansas Highway 258, at the southwest corner of Horton Road. It was a single-story stone structure, rectangular in shape, with a gable-on-hip roof that had a wide overhang and exposed rafters in the Craftsman style. Its front (eastern) facade had a gabled porch above the entrance at its center. It was built in the late 1930s with funding support from the Works Progress Administration. The building now houses a church, with a modern ell extending to the north.

The building was listed on the National Register of Historic Places in 1992. It has been listed as destroyed in the Arkansas Historic Preservation Program database.

== See also ==
- National Register of Historic Places listings in White County, Arkansas
