= Hopewell Hall =

Settlement in Saint Thomas Parish, Jamaica

Coordinates: 17°56′N 76°20′W

Hopewell Hall is a settlement in Saint Thomas Parish, Jamaica.
