= Hopewell, Newfoundland and Labrador =

Coordinates: 55°28′00″N 60°13′00″W

Hopewell is an unincorporated place in the Canadian province of Newfoundland and Labrador, located south west of St. John's. It had a population of 221 in 1956.

== See also ==
- List of communities in Newfoundland and Labrador
