= Hopewell, Saint Andrew =

Jamaican settlement

Coordinates: 18°03′N 76°43′W

Hopewell is a settlement in Saint Andrew Parish, Jamaica.
