= Hopewell High School, Jamaica =

Coordinates: 18.451231°N 78.037101°W

Hopewell High School

Location
- Bergamo Blvd; Hopewell, Hanover, Jamaica

Information
- School type: Public high school secondary high
- Motto: Forging Towards Excellence
- Founded: September 4, 2006
- School district: Hopewell
- Chairman: Mr. Dalton Hastings
- Principal: Mr. Byron Grant
- Grades: 7-13
- Years offered: 2006-present
- Gender: male and female
- Age: 11 to 19
- Enrollment: 1100
- Classes: 20
- Average class size: 45
- Student to teacher ratio: 25:1
- Classes offered: Science, English Language, English Literature, Mathematics, Business Education, Physical Education, Information technology, Social Studies, Biology, Human & Social Biology, Chemistry, Food & Nutrition, Clothing & Textiles, Food & Beverage Mgt, Cosmetology, Agriculture, Industrial Techniques, Carpentry & Joinery, Electrical, Mechanical, Accounts, Electronic Document Prep, Reading, customer engagement management
- Colours: purple and Gold
- Feeder to: Bethel Primary & Junior High and Sandy Bay Primary
- Graduates: 91

Hopewell High School is a public learning institution located in Hanover, Jamaica.

== History ==
The Hopewell High School opened its doors on September 4, 2006, with a student population of approximately 400 students; 207 students being females and 193 males. There were 19 academic staff members, 1 school nurse, 8 administrative workers, 7 janitorial workers, 2 assistant cooks, a chef, and three grounds men. The pioneer students came mainly from the surrounding areas such as Hanover and St. James. These students were placed in seven groups of grade 7 and seven groups of grade 9 (namely Hopewel).

== Clubs ==
- Performing Arts
- Inter-School Christian Fellowship
- Spanish
- Debating
- Bible Quiz
- Football
- Environmental
- Chess
- Junior Jacees (JCI)
- Sign Language
- Band
- Choir
- Tourism Action
- Culture
- 4-H
