= Hopewell Presbyterian Church and Cemetery =

Historic site in Mecklenburg County, North Carolina

- Hopewell Presbyterian Church
- U.S. National Register of Historic Places
- U.S. Historic district
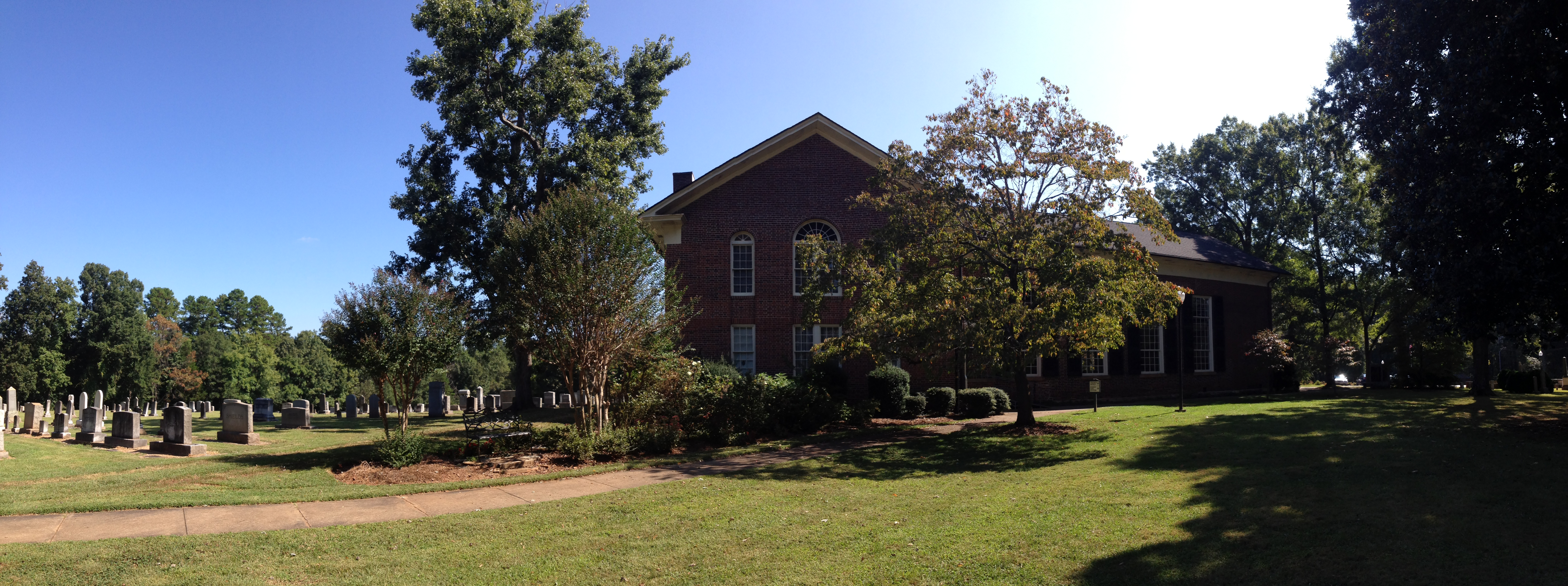

- Location within North Carolina Location within the United States
- Location: 10500 Beatties Ford Rd., near Huntersville, North Carolina
- Coordinates: 35°21′55″N 80°53′54″W
- Area: 13.8 acres (5.6 ha)
- Built: 1775, 1831–35, 1859–60, 1928
- Architect: Hoover, H.; Rice, Thomas
- Architectural style: Greek Revival, Colonial Revival, Bungalow/craftsman
- NRHP reference No.: 96000198
- Added to NRHP: March 1, 1996

Hopewell Presbyterian Church is a historic Presbyterian church complex and national historic district located near Huntersville, Mecklenburg County, North Carolina. The church was built in 1833–1835, renovated and enlarged in 1859–1860, and expanded by a Sunday School addition in 1928. It is a U-shaped brick and brick veneer building composed of three connected blocks all covered with front-gable roofs. The church is a rectangular gable-front brick building standing on a low mortared fieldstone foundation and Greek Revival style design elements. Also on the property are the contributing pumphouse (c. 1925), cemetery gate (1845), and cemetery with burials dating to 1775. The cemetery contains one of the two largest collections of box and chest tombs in North Carolina. General William Lee Davidson of the North Carolina militia, killed in 1781 at the Battle of Cowan's Ford during the American Revolutionary War, is buried in the cemetery.

It was added to the National Register of Historic Places in 1996.
