= Hopewell Presbyterian Church and Hopewell Cemetery =

Historic site in Florence County, South Carolina, US

- U.S. National Register of Historic Places
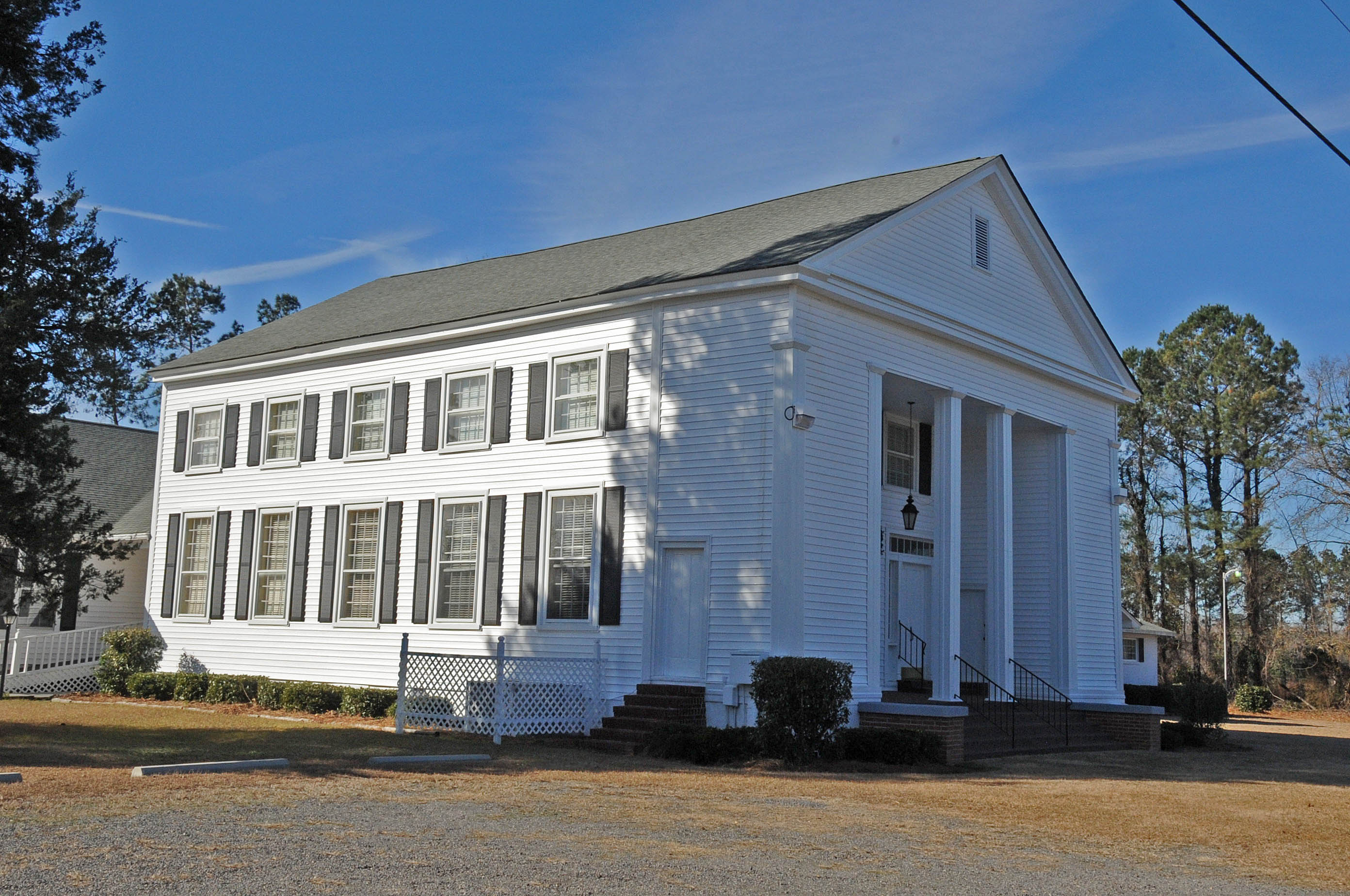

- Location within South Carolina Location within the United States
- Location: 5314 Old River Rd., Florence, South Carolina
- Coordinates: 34°7′42″N 79°37′26″W
- Area: 5.7 acres (2.3 ha)
- Built: 1842
- Architectural style: Greek Revival
- NRHP reference No.: 00000589
- Added to NRHP: June 02, 2000

Hopewell Presbyterian Church and Hopewell Cemetery is a historic Presbyterian church and cemetery located at 5314 Old River Road in Florence, South Carolina. The two-story, frame, Greek Revival-style church was completed in 1842. It features a pedimented front gable end and two-story portico. It is clad in weatherboard and rests on a brick pier foundation with brick infill. The cemetery, in use since the late-18th century, occupies a three-acre site where the original Hopewell Presbyterian Church stood. It contains a notable collection of 19th century marble headstones and monuments. Inside the cemetery is the church's early Session House.

It was listed on the National Register of Historic Places in 2000.
