= Hopewell, Westmoreland =

Human settlement in Jamaica

Coordinates: 18°15′N 78°18′W

Hopewell is a settlement in Sheffield District of Westmoreland Parish, Jamaica.
