= Hopewell, New Mexico =

- Unincorporated community
- Interactive map of Hopewell, New Mexico
- Coordinates: 36°42′34″N 106°14′52″W
- Country: United States
- State: New Mexico
- County: Rio Arriba
- Elevation: 8,068 ft (2,459 m)

Population (1960–2010)
  - Total: 0
- Time zone: UTC-7 (Mountain (MST))
  - Summer (DST): UTC-6 (MDT)
- Area code: 575
- GNIS feature ID: 901632

Hopewell is a former unincorporated community in Rio Arriba County, New Mexico, United States. It is located in the Tusas Mountains just above Hopewell Lake, approximately ½ mile south of U.S. Route 64. It was named for rancher and promoter Willard S. Hopewell and had a U.S. Post Office from 1894 to 1906.

There are a number of old prospect pits in the area, as well as a snowpack measuring station that was established in 1993.

== Climate ==
Climate data for Hopewell, New Mexico, 1991–2020 normals, 1988-2020 extremes: 10000ft (3048m)
Month	Jan	Feb	Mar	Apr	May	Jun	Jul	Aug	Sep	Oct	Nov	Dec	Year
Record high °F (°C)	53 (12)	54 (12)	63 (17)	64 (18)	78 (26)	81 (27)	82 (28)	80 (27)	75 (24)	67 (19)	60 (16)	52 (11)	82 (28)
Mean maximum °F (°C)	45.1 (7.3)	46.9 (8.3)	53.1 (11.7)	58.5 (14.7)	66.9 (19.4)	74.8 (23.8)	76.5 (24.7)	73.7 (23.2)	69.2 (20.7)	61.8 (16.6)	52.9 (11.6)	45.1 (7.3)	77.0 (25.0)
Mean daily maximum °F (°C)	31.4 (−0.3)	33.6 (0.9)	41.1 (5.1)	47.1 (8.4)	55.9 (13.3)	66.5 (19.2)	69.6 (20.9)	67.1 (19.5)	60.9 (16.1)	50.4 (10.2)	39.2 (4.0)	30.9 (−0.6)	49.5 (9.7)
Daily mean °F (°C)	22.7 (−5.2)	24.2 (−4.3)	30.5 (−0.8)	36.2 (2.3)	44.9 (7.2)	54.6 (12.6)	58.3 (14.6)	56.5 (13.6)	50.6 (10.3)	40.9 (4.9)	30.4 (−0.9)	22.6 (−5.2)	39.4 (4.1)
Mean daily minimum °F (°C)	14.0 (−10.0)	14.8 (−9.6)	19.9 (−6.7)	25.2 (−3.8)	33.9 (1.1)	42.6 (5.9)	47.0 (8.3)	45.9 (7.7)	40.3 (4.6)	31.4 (−0.3)	21.6 (−5.8)	14.2 (−9.9)	29.2 (−1.5)
Mean minimum °F (°C)	−1.9 (−18.8)	−1.6 (−18.7)	3.8 (−15.7)	11.8 (−11.2)	21.7 (−5.7)	32.1 (0.1)	40.8 (4.9)	40.1 (4.5)	28.9 (−1.7)	15.7 (−9.1)	2.5 (−16.4)	−4.2 (−20.1)	−7.4 (−21.9)
Record low °F (°C)	−19 (−28)	−18 (−28)	−12 (−24)	2 (−17)	13 (−11)	14 (−10)	31 (−1)	31 (−1)	16 (−9)	2 (−17)	−9 (−23)	−19 (−28)	−19 (−28)
Average precipitation inches (mm)	3.55 (90)	3.49 (89)	3.18 (81)	2.40 (61)	1.51 (38)	0.46 (12)	1.64 (42)	2.28 (58)	1.69 (43)	1.88 (48)	2.62 (67)	3.24 (82)	27.94 (711)
Source 1: NOAA
Source 2: XMACIS2 (records & monthly max/mins)
