= Hopewell Center, New York =

Hopewell Center
- hamlet
- Location of Hopewell Center in New York
- Coordinates: 42°54′04″N 77°11′03″W
- Country: United States
- State: New York
- County: Ontario
- Elevation: 837 ft (255 m)
- ZIP code: 12057

Hopewell Center (also, Hopewell Centre) is a hamlet in Ontario County, New York, United States. It lies at an elevation of 837 feet (255 m).
