= Raymont Hopewell =

American serial killer

- Born: June 11, 1971 (age 55); Baltimore, Maryland, U.S.
- Convictions: First degree murder (5 counts); First degree rape (4 counts); Assault (4 counts)
- Penalty: Life imprisonment without parole

Details
- Victims: 5
- Span of crimes: 1999–2005
- Country: United States
- State: Maryland
- Date apprehended: September 20, 2005
- Imprisoned at: Western Correctional Institution, Cumberland, Maryland

Raymont Hopewell (born June 11, 1971) is an American serial killer and rapist who, from 1999 to 2005, murdered five elderly people during home invasions in Baltimore, Maryland. In a deal with prosecutors, Hopewell pleaded guilty to five counts of murder in order to avoid a death sentence and received four life sentences.

== Early life ==
Raymont Hopewell was born in Baltimore on June 11, 1971. Raised in an area near Gwynns Falls/Leakin Park, Hopewell was recounted as a regular kid; he would ride bikes, play hide and seek, and had a big friend group. Little else is known about his upbringing, but in his sophomore year of high school he dropped out. He soon fell into the use of heroin to which he would get addicted. His addiction led him to start committing crimes. These crimes led to convictions for drug possession, intent to sell drugs, burglary, battery, theft, and resisting arrest.

== Murders ==
On February 21, 1999, Hopewell killed 60-year-old Constance Wills. A friend of Wills' family, Hopewell broke into the home and attacked Wills in the bedroom. He tied her wrists together, sexually assaulted her, beat her then strangled her to death. He then took valuables from the home. The body of Wills was discovered by her daughter and her neighbor. The next day, police ruled her death a homicide. Hopewell was arrested in 2001 after attempting to sell cocaine to an undercover police officer. He was released on $5,000 bail. In September 2002, he was convicted of the drug charge and given two years of probation. Two months later, Hopewell entered the Greenwell Apartments for elderly and disabled in northern Baltimore, where at the time, his mother was living. Across from his mother's apartment was the apartment of 88-year-old Sarah Shannon. On November 30, 2002, Hopewell broke into Shannon's apartment and located her in her bed. He raped and strangled her to death and took valuables. Her body was found by a relative after she had not answered any of her phone calls.

In 2004, Hopewell was arrested for violating his probation. On April 10 of that year, he was sentenced to serve 18 months in prison. Under guidelines of a 2002 ruling by the then Baltimore mayor and future Maryland governor Martin O'Malley, he would have been required to submit a sample of his DNA. However, Hopewell was never told to submit a sample of his DNA. From April to July 2004, Hopewell was housed at Baltimore City Detention Center before being transferred to Metropolitan Transition Center. The following month he was again transferred to a halfway house where he and other felons were sent to await release. Under the terms of the facility felons were allowed to leave the premises on work release. On September 2, 2004, Hopewell failed to show back to the facility after he was let out on a furlough. As such, he was reported as a walk off and added to a local wanted list.

=== 2005 crime spree ===
On May 31, 2005, Hopewell broke into the apartment of 78-year-old Sadie Mack in the Sandtown neighborhood. Using a shoestring, he tied Mack's hands together, took off her pants, and sexually assaulted her. He then strangled her to death. Her body was found later that day by her son Ernest. On August 21, Hopewell entered 82-year-old Carlton Crawford's apartment. He tied Crawford, who was deaf, by the ankles then continently beat him and ended up killing him. Two downstairs neighbors, Bruce Boulware and D'Twain Holmes-Boulware, heard loud noises coming from Crawford's apartment. The couple notified security of the odd noises. When a female security guard knocked on Crawford's door, Hopewell answered and told the officer that Crawford had simply fallen, but when the officer asked to come in, Hopewell refused. She threatened to call police to which Hopewell dared her to. She then walked away, and Hopewell ran out of the building. The responding officers found Crawford's body on the floor.

On August 31, Hopewell was prowling through Windsor Hills when he approached the home of 78-year-old Lydia Rowena Wingfield, who was the mother of his childhood friend Jerrold. Introducing himself as "money", he claimed to have known Jerrold as a child but refused to reveal his real identity. He later left the premises and Lydia called her son to ask about the strange encounter. Later in the afternoon Hopewell broke into the home, tied Lydia up, raped, and strangled her to death. Her body was later found by Jerrold. On September 2, Hopewell broke into a home in west Baltimore that belonged to a 63-year-old woman. Finding she was not upstairs, Hopewell settled in the kitchen and ransacked through her food and drinks. He eventually found her hiding in the basement. At knifepoint he raped her and left the home without killing her. Seven days later, on September 9, Hopewell attacked an elderly couple in their Spaulding Avenue home. Having cut a hole in the kitchen screen door, Hopewell attacked the 55-year-old woman and the 61-year-old man. He brandished a knife and demanded $150. The woman told Hopewell that she had already called the police, and in response, he fled the home.

The following day he broke into the home of senior couple 80-year-old Thomas Tabron and 76-year-old Amelia Gertrude Tabron. He confronted Amelia in the living room and told her "I am here to kill you and your husband". Amelia pleaded for him not to. Hopewell brandished a butcher knife and attempted to attack her. Amelia was able to grab his knife, only for Hopewell to forcefully pull it back, slicing her hand in the process. He then pushed her to the floor and attacked Thomas, who fought with Hopewell and ended up sustaining minor injuries himself. Hopewell then took some money and left the house.

== Arrest, trial and imprisonment ==
Jerrold Wingfield reported what his mother had told him shortly before she was killed. He denied ever having met anyone named money; however, one of Jerrold's friends came forward and stated that he did know someone who was nicknamed money, a man named Raymont Hopewell. Upon learning this Jerrold stated he began to remember Hopewell from his childhood, and reported this information to the police. By the time police received the tip, Hopewell had already been arrested in Crawford's murder. In a police line-up, the security guard from Crawford's murder identified Hopewell as the man who answered the door, and he was arrested. Following his arrest, a sample of his DNA was uploaded into the system, which confirmed his responsibility in Crawford's murder, Wingfield's murder, and the eight other attacks.

In December 2005, he was charged with five counts of murder, four counts of assault, and one count of rape. He was slated to be tried in September 2006. Persecutors sought the death penalty. Shortly before his scheduled trial, Hopewell accepted a plea deal which allowed him to plead guilty to all charges to avoid a death sentence. On September 14, 2006, Hopewell was given four consecutive life sentences without the possibility of parole. At his sentencing he apologized to the families of his victims. Hopewell is currently serving his sentence at Western Correctional Institution in Allegany County, Maryland.

== See also ==
- List of serial killers in the United States
