= Menra Hopewell =

Menra Hopewell (c. 1821–1881) was an American medical doctor and writer. He was best known as the writer of a biography of DeWitt Clinton, and co-author of a biographical history of St. Louis, Missouri but these have fallen from favour and he is most notable for the mixture of fiction and distorted facts that he published as Legends of the Missouri.

According to the New York City Directory for 1857–58 he was a medical doctor at 204 Monroe Street. Early in 1858 he moved to Missouri, and his Legends of the Missouri series of articles appeared anonymously in the Missouri Republican from April 12, 1858. The St. Louis City Directory shows him practicing as a medical doctor at 290 Chestnut Street, in 1859 and 1860.

Edward's Great West And Her Commercial Metropolis, Embracing A General View of the West, And A Complete History of St. Louis, From The Landing of Ligueste, In 1764, To The Present Time was a history of St. Louis containing portraits and biographies of some of the old settlers, and many of the most prominent business men. Hopewell collaborated with the eponymous Richard Edwards on this work. Edwards was the publisher of the magazine Edwards Monthly and the book was published out of his offices.

Soon after he emigrated to England. His daughter, Margaret, was born in Kent in 1862. She was living with him at 79 Lansdown Road, Croydon when he died, aged 60, in the second quarter of 1881.

== Bibliography ==
- 'Legends of the Missouri' series, Missouri Republican (1859)
- Report of the Annual Fair of St. Louis Agricultural and Mechanical Association 1859 (St. Louis, 1859)
- with Richard Edwards, The Great West and Her Commercial Metropolis (St. Louis: Trubner, 1860)
- Report of the Annual Fair of St. Louis Agricultural and Mechanical Association 1860 (St. Louis, 1860)
- History of the Missouri Volunteer Militia (St. Louis: 1861)
- Report of the Annual Fair of St. Louis Agricultural and Mechanical Association 1861 (St. Louis, 1861)
- Legends of the Missouri and Mississippi in three booklets (London: Beadle & Adams, 1862-3)
- Legends of the Missouri and Mississippi (London: Ward Locke & Taylor, 1874)
