= Hopewell Township =

Hopewell Township may refer to:

== Arkansas ==
- Hopewell Township, Greene County, Arkansas, in Greene County, Arkansas

== Illinois ==
- Hopewell Township, Marshall County, Illinois

== New Jersey ==
- Hopewell Township, Cumberland County, New Jersey
- Hopewell Township, Mercer County, New Jersey

== Nova Scotia ==
- Hopewell Township, Cumberland County, Nova Scotia

== Ohio ==
- Hopewell Township, Licking County, Ohio
- Hopewell Township, Mercer County, Ohio
- Hopewell Township, Muskingum County, Ohio
- Hopewell Township, Perry County, Ohio
- Hopewell Township, Seneca County, Ohio

== Pennsylvania ==
- Hopewell Township, Beaver County, Pennsylvania
- Hopewell Township, Bedford County, Pennsylvania
- Hopewell Township, Cumberland County, Pennsylvania
- Hopewell Township, Huntingdon County, Pennsylvania
- Hopewell Township, Washington County, Pennsylvania
- Hopewell Township, York County, Pennsylvania
