= Pollard Hopewell =

Pollard Hopewell (between 1786 and 1789 - June 1, 1813) was a midshipman in the United States Navy during the War of 1812. He was killed in the battle of the US frigate Chesapeake with the British frigate Shannon.

He was the only child of Pollard Hopewell and his wife, Catherine Hebb, who were married on December 19, 1785. Pollard, Jr. was born sometime between 1786 and 1789. He was orphaned at an early age. His father died in 1796 and his mother died on August 5, 1799. Pollard, Jr. was left in the care of his uncle, James Hopewell.

Hopewell entered the navy as a midshipman on June 4, 1812, from St. Mary's County, Maryland. He reported to the frigate Chesapeake on August 21. With a new crew, Captain James Lawrence put to sea to engage the British frigate HMS Shannon on June 1, 1813. Despite their captain's famous cry, "Don't give up the ship", the crew was overwhelmed and the ship taken. Midshipman Hopewell was among those killed, as was Lawrence.

== Namesakes ==
Two ships were named USS Hopewell in his honor.
